= Korean tea =

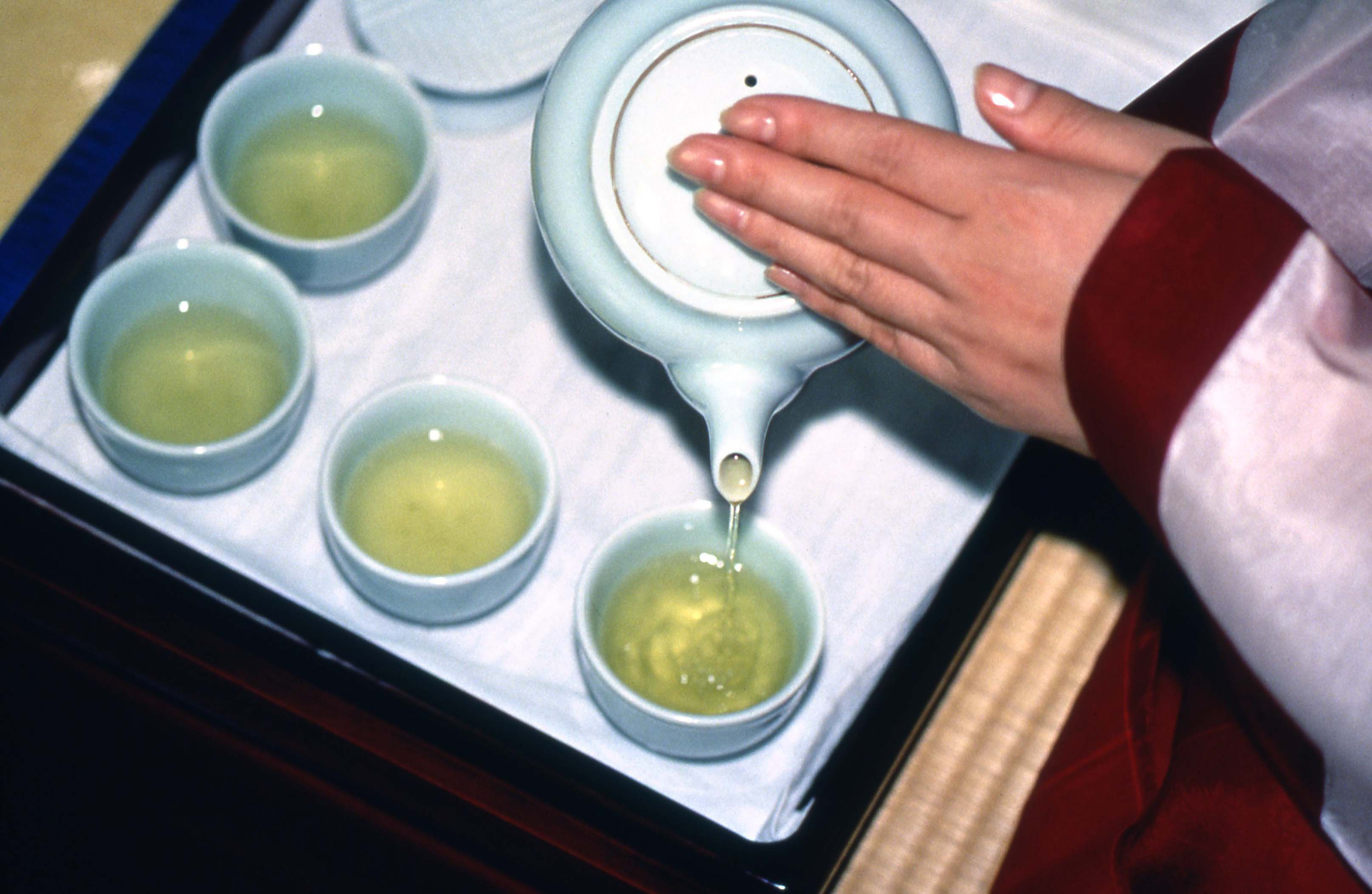
- nokcha (green tea)

Korean name
- Hangul: 전통차
- Hanja: 傳統茶
- RR: jeontongcha
- MR: chŏnt'ongch'a
- IPA: [tɕʌn.tʰoŋ.tɕʰa]

Korean tea is a group of beverages consisting of boiled water infused with leaves (such as the tea plant Camellia sinensis), roots, flowers, fruits, grains, edible mushrooms, or seaweed. It may or may not contain tea leaves.

== History ==
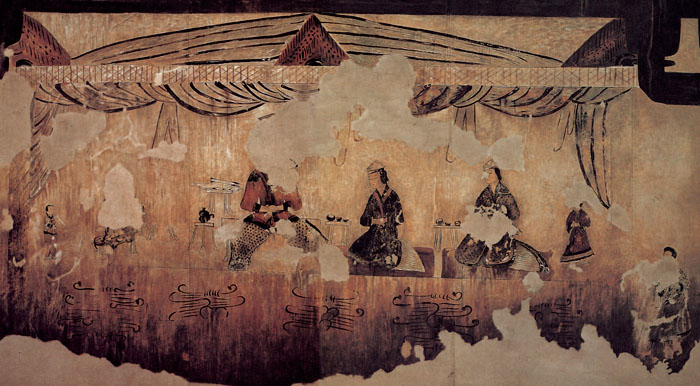
Gakjeochong, a Goguryeo tomb, shows a knight drinking tea with two ladies (5-6th century)

According to the Record of Gaya, cited in the Memorabilia of the Three Kingdoms, the legendary queen Heo Hwang-ok, a princess of the State of "Ayuta" (theorized to be Ayodhya, India), brought the Camellia sinensis (var. assamica) tea plant from India to Korea and planted it on Baegwolsan, a mountain that borders the city of Changwon. In practice, however, Labrador tea and fruit teas, such as magnolia berry tea and goji berry tea, were more widely used in the Samhan Era instead.

It is a widely held belief that the systematic planting of tea bushes began with the introduction of tea culture by Buddhist monks some centuries later. Some of the earliest Buddhist temples in Korea, such as Bulgapsa, Bulhoesa, and Hwaeomsa, claim to be the birthplace of Korean tea culture. The import of Chinese tea products started during the reign of Queen Seondeok of Silla (631‒647), when two types of tea bricks, jeoncha (전차; 磚茶) and dancha (단차; 團茶), were imported from the Tang Empire. In 765, a Buddhist monk is said to have presented an offering of the tea to King Gyeongdeok and the Buddha. Camellia sinensis tea plants spread throughout the country in 828, when King Heungdeok received seeds from the Tang Empire and sent them to be planted on the Jirisan mountain. Tea was usually offered to the Buddha, as well as to the spirits of deceased ancestors.

Tea culture continued to prosper during the Goryeo period. Tea offering was a part of the biggest national ceremonies, such as Yeondeunghoe and Palgwanhoe, and tea towns were formed around temples. During the reign of King Myeongjong (1131‒1202), Seon-Buddhist manners of ceremony prevailed. Chŏng Mong-ju and other scholars enjoyed tea poetry, dasi (다시; 茶詩), and tea meetings, dahoe (다회; 茶會). The state of daseonilchi (다선일치; 茶禪一致; "tea and seon in accord") was eulogized. Xu Jing, a Song dynasty envoy who visited Goryeo in 1123, wrote in the Gaoli tujing that the people of Goryeo were avid tea drinkers and set out tea three times a day. Coins were accepted at tea and wine shops (茶酒店).

During the Joseon period (1392–1910), Korean tea culture underwent secularization. The royal family and aristocracy used tea for simple rites, a practice referred to as darye (다례; 茶禮, "tea rite"), which is often translated as "etiquette for tea". Towards the end of the Joseon dynasty, commoners adopted the practice of using tea for ancestral rites. The word charye (차례; 茶禮, "tea rite"), cognate to darye, now refers to jesa (ancestral rite). In the past, the two terms were synonymous, as ancestral rites often involved offerings of tea to the ancestors. Wedding ceremonies also included tea offerings. The practice of packing tea into small cakes, which lost popularity in China during the 14th century, continued in Korea until the 19th century.

In 1895, King Gojong of the Korean Empire used coffee for the first time. In 1896, grocery stores began to have tea rooms as annexes, and the first modern tea house was established in 1924.

== Traditions ==
The Korean Tea Ceremony, called Darye, embodies Confucian principles of harmony, respect, and gratitude. It occurs in a traditional Korean house, with participants wearing hanbok attire. Darye involves tea preparation, serving, and presentation. The host serves tea to guests in order of importance, using a ceramic teapot and small cups. It is believed that Darye fosters a peaceful ambiance for appreciating tea's beauty, meaningful conversations, and reflection on respect and gratitude.

== Market ==
Although tea from the Camellia sinensis plant is not as popular as coffee in South Korea – with the annual South Korean tea consumption at 0.16 kg (0.35 lb) per capita, compared to 3.9 kg (8.6 lb) for coffee – grain teas are served in many restaurants instead of water. Herbal and fruit teas are commonly served, both hot and cold.

== Varieties ==
=== From Camellia sinensis ===
==== Unoxidized ====
- Nokcha (녹차; 綠茶; "green tea")
  Green tea, the most common form of Korean leaf tea, is a nonoxidized tea made from the dried leaves of the tea plant. Nokcha can be classified into various types based on several different factors. The most common is the flush, or the time of the year when the leaves are plucked (and thus also by leaf size): these varieties are named ujeon (우전; 雨前; "pre-rain"), sejak (세작; 細雀; "thin sparrow"), jungjak (중작; 中雀; "medium sparrow"), and daejak (대작; 大雀; "big sparrow").
  Loose leaf tea is called ipcha (잎차) or yeopcha (엽차; 葉茶), while powdered tea is called garu-cha (가루차) or malcha (말차; 末茶). Roasted deokkeum-cha (덖음차; "roasted tea") are more popular than steamed jeungje-cha (증제차; 蒸製茶; "steamed tea").
  Southern, warmer regions such as Boseong, Hadong, and Jeju are famous for producing high-quality tea leaves. Banya-cha (반야차; 般若茶; "prajñā tea") and Jungno-cha (죽로차; 竹露茶; "bamboo dew tea") among others are renowned. Nokcha can be blended with other ingredients, such as roasted brown rice to make hyeonmi-nokcha (현미녹차; 玄米綠茶; "brown rice green tea") or lemon to make remon-nokcha (레몬 녹차; "lemon green tea").

==== Partially oxidized ====
- Hwangcha (황차; 黃茶; "yellow tea")
  A tea made of partially oxidized leaves of the tea plant. The tea, like oolong from China, is a cross between unoxidized green tea and fully oxidized black tea. The oxidation process for hwangcha is very specific, which enables it to develop its unique flavor.

==== Oxidized - Western Origin ====
- Hongcha (홍차; 紅茶; "red tea")
  Fully oxidized tea, called black tea in the west, is called "red tea" in Korea, as well as in China and Japan. Jaekseol-cha (잭설차), whose name shares the same origin as the green tea jakseol, is a traditional black tea variety from Hadong in South Gyeongsang Province.

==== Post-fermented ====
- Tteokcha (떡차; "cake tea") or byeongcha (병차; 餠茶; "cake tea")
  A post-fermented tea brick. Borim-cha (보림차; 寶林茶) or Borim-baengmo-cha (보림백모차; 寶林白茅茶), named after its birthplace, the Borim temple in Jangheung, South Jeolla Province, is a popular tteokcha variety.
- Doncha (돈차; "money tea"), jeoncha (전차; 錢茶; "money tea") or cheongtaejeon (청태전; 靑苔錢; "green moss coin") is a post-fermented tea brick, made into the shape of yeopjeon, the Joseon coins with holes.

=== Other leaf teas ===
Tea	Korean name	Image	Ingredient
Baegyeop-cha (pine leaf tea)	백엽차; 柏葉茶		Korean pine needles
Baeksan-cha (white mountain tea)	백산차; 白山茶		Labrador tea leaves
Bakha-cha (mint tea)	박하차; 薄荷茶		East Asian wild mint leaves
Daennip-cha (bamboo leaf tea)	댓잎차		Bamboo leaves
Gamnip-cha (persimmon leaf tea)	감잎차		Oriental persimmon leaves
Hwangsan-cha (rosebay tea)	황산차; 黃酸茶		Lapland rosebay leaves
Iseul-cha (dew tea); Gamno-cha (sweet dew tea)	이슬차 감로차; 甘露茶		mountain hydrangea leaves
Maegoe-cha (rugose rose tea)	매괴차; 玫瑰茶		rugose rose leaves
Mulssuk-cha (mugwort tea)	물쑥차		common mugwort
Ppongnip-cha (mulberry leaf tea)	뽕잎차		white mulberry leaves
Seombaengnihyang-cha (thyme tea)	섬백리향차		Ulleungdo thyme
Sollip-cha (pine leaf tea)	솔잎차		Korean red pine needles
Ssukcha (mugwort tea)	쑥차		Korean mugwort
Yeonnip-cha (lotus leaf tea)	연잎차		lotus leaves

=== Flower teas ===
Tea	Korean name	Image	Ingredient
Dohwa-cha (peach flower tea)	도화차; 桃花茶		peach blossoms
Goehwa-cha (pagoda flower tea)	괴화차; 槐花茶		pagoda flowers
Gujeolcho-cha (dendranthema tea)	구절초차; 九節草茶		white-lobe Korean dendranthema flowers
Gukhwa-cha (chrysanthemum tea)	국화차; 菊花茶		Indian chrysanthemum flowers
Gyehwa-cha (cinnamon flower tea)	계화차; 桂花茶		Chinese cinnamon flowers
Gyulhwa-cha (citrus flower tea)	귤화차; 橘花茶		citrus flowers
Maehwa-cha (plum flower tea)	매화차; 梅花茶		Chinese plum blossoms
Mindeulle-cha (dandelion tea)	민들레차		Korean dandelion
Mongnyeon-cha (magnolia tea)	목련차; 木蓮茶		kobus magnolia flowers
Yeonkkot-cha (lotus flower tea); Yeonhwa-cha (lotus flower tea)	연꽃차 연화차; 蓮花茶		lotus flowers

=== Fruit teas ===
Tea	Korean name	Image	Ingredient
Daechu-cha (jujube tea)	대추차		jujube
Gugija-cha (goji tea)	구기자차; 枸杞子茶		goji berries
Gyulpi-cha (citrus peel tea)	귤피차; 橘皮茶		citrus peels
Hobak-cha (pumpkin tea)	호박차		cheese pumpkin
Maesil-cha (plum tea)	매실차; 梅實茶		Chinese plums
Mogwa-cha (quince tea)	모과차		Chinese quince
Ogwa-cha (five fruit tea)	오과차; 五果茶		walnut ginkgo jujube chestnut dried persimmon
Omae-cha (smoked plum tea)	오매차; 烏梅茶		smoked plums
Omija-cha (magnolia berry tea)	오미자차; 五味子茶		magnolia berries
Sansuyu-cha (cornelian cherry tea)	산수유차; 山茱萸茶		cornelian cherry
Seongnyu-cha (pomegranate tea)	석류차; 石榴茶		pomegranates
Taengja-cha (hardy orange tea)	탱자차		hardy oranges
Yuja-cha (yuja tea)	유자차; 柚子茶		yuja

=== Grain, bean, and seed teas ===
Tea	Korean name	Image	Ingredient
Bori-cha (barley tea)	보리차		barley
Gyeolmyeongja-cha (sicklepod tea)	결명자차; 決明子茶		sicklepods
Hyeonmi-cha (brown rice tea)	현미차; 玄米茶		brown rice
Memil-cha (buckwheat tea)	메밀차		buckwheat
Misu-cha (rice tea)	미수차		rice
Nokdu-cha (mung bean tea)	녹두차; 綠豆茶		mung beans
Oksusu-cha (corn tea)	옥수수차		corn kernels
Yulmu-cha (Job's tears tea)	율무차		Coix lacryma-jobi var. ma-yuen

=== Root, shoot, and bark teas ===
Tea	Korean name	Image	Ingredient
Danggwi-cha (angelica root tea)	당귀차; 當歸茶		Korean angelica root
Doraji-cha (balloon flower root tea)	도라지차		balloon flower root
Dunggulle-cha (Solomon's seal tea)	둥굴레차		Solomon's seal root
Chikcha / Galgeun-cha (arrow root tea)	칡차 갈근차; 葛根茶		East Asian arrow root
Gyepi-cha (cinnamon tea)	계피차; 桂皮茶		Chinese cinnamon bark
Hongsam-cha (red ginseng tea)	홍삼차; 紅蔘茶		red ginseng
Insam-cha (ginseng tea)	인삼차; 人蔘茶		Korean ginseng
Macha (yam tea)	마차; 麻茶		Chinese yam
Misam-cha (ginseng root hair tea)	미삼차; 尾蔘茶		Korean ginseng root hair
Saenggang-cha (ginger tea)	생강차; 生薑茶		ginger
Ueong-cha (burdock tea)	우엉차		burdock roots
Yeongeun-cha (lotus root tea)	연근차; 蓮根茶		lotus root

=== Combination and other teas ===
Tea	Korean name	Image	Ingredient
Beoseot-cha (mushroom tea)	버섯차		edible mushrooms
Dasima-cha (kelp tea)	다시마차		kelp
Donga-cha (wintermelon tea)	동아차		winter melon flesh winter melon seeds
Giguk-cha (goji chrysanthemum tea)	기국차; 杞菊茶		northern dendranthema goji berries black sesame seeds jakseol green tea leaves milk
Gyulgang-cha (citrus ginger tea)	귤강차; 橘薑茶		citrus fruit pyeongang
Hyeonmi-nokcha (brown rice green tea)	현미녹차; 玄米綠茶		brown rice green tea leaves
Jeho-tang	제호탕; 醍醐湯		smoked plums medicinal cardamom white sandalwood black cardamom honey
Podo-cha (grape tea)	포도차; 葡萄茶		grapes Korean pear ginger honey
Ssanghwa-tang	쌍화탕; 雙和湯		white woodland peony root rehmannia root Mongolian milkvetch root Korean angelica root lovage root Chinese cinnamon bark Chinese liquorice
Sunchae-cha (watershield tea)	순채차; 蓴菜茶		watershield leaves magnolia berry-infused water honey pine nuts

== See also ==
- Misutgaru
- Sujeonggwa
