= Ogwa-cha =

Korean five-fruit tea

- Type: Herbal tea
- Origin: Korea
- Ingredients: Walnut, ginkgo, jujube, chestnut, gotgam

Korean name
- Hangul: 오과차
- Hanja: 五果茶
- RR: ogwacha
- MR: ogwach'a
- IPA: [o.ɡwa.tɕʰa]

Ogwa-cha (Korean: 오과차; Hanja: 五果茶) or five fruit tea is a traditional Korean tea made with walnut, ginkgo, jujube, chestnut, and gotgam (dried persimmon). The ingredients are mashed with ginger, boiled in water, and strained to make the tea. Optionally, honey can be added to taste.

== See also ==
- Daechu-cha
- Sujeonggwa
