= Jeho-tang =

Korean spiced drink

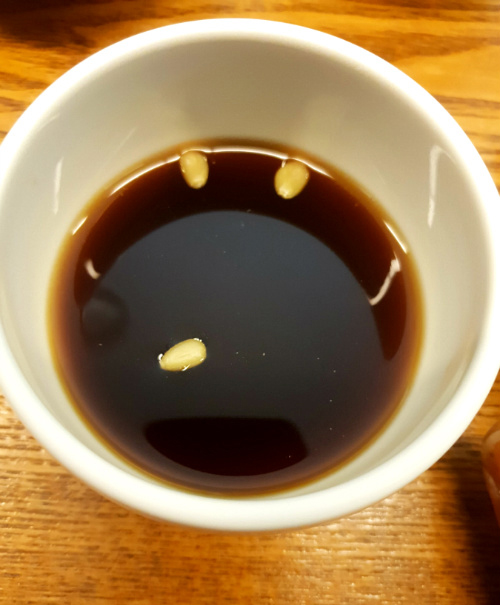
- Type: Tea
- Origin: Korea
- Ingredients: Smoked plums, medicinal cardamom, white sandalwood, black cardamom, honey

Korean name
- Hangul: 제호탕
- Hanja: 醍醐湯
- RR: jehotang
- MR: chehot'ang
- IPA: [tɕe.ɦo.tʰaŋ]

Jeho-tang (Korean: 제호탕; lit. 'Sarpir-maṇḍa drink') is a traditional Korean cold drink made with honey and several ingredients used in traditional Korean medicine. The ingredients include omae (오매; 烏梅, "smoked unripe plums"), sain (사인; 沙仁, "medicinal cardamom"), baekdanhyang (백단향; 白檀香, "white sandalwood"), and chogwa (초과; 草果, "black cardamom"). The powdered ingredients are mixed together with honey and water and then boiled. After the liquid is chilled, it is diluted in cold water. It was considered the best summer drink in Korean royal court cuisine.

== See also ==
- Hwachae (punch)
- Sikhye (rice punch)
- Ssanghwa-tang (medical tea)
- Sujeonggwa (cinnamon punch)
