= Samyang Dabang =

Coffeehouse in Jeonju, South Korea

Restaurant information
- Established: 1952; 73 years ago
- Food type: Dabang (coffeehouse)
- Location: 7-9 Gyeongwon-dong 2(i)-ga, Wansan District, Jeonju, South Korea
- Coordinates: 35.8182°N 127.1488°E

Samyang Dabang (Korean: 삼양다방) is a historic dabang (coffeehouse) in Gyeongwon-dong, Wansan District, Jeonju, South Korea. It is the oldest active coffeehouse in the country, having been founded in 1952. The dabang was made a Jeonju Future Heritage in 2019 and set for preservation.

The dabang was founded amidst the 1950–1953 Korean War, and reportedly served as a refuge for intellectuals during this period. The dabang was initially set to close in 2013 due to competition from coffee chains, but it was reportedly saved from closure by locals.

As with other dabangs, it also serves beverages other than coffee, including ssanghwa-tang and misu. The dabang was featured in the drama My Love from the Star.

== See also ==
- Hakrim Dabang – the oldest dabang in Seoul
- List of oldest restaurants in South Korea
