= Cinnamon tea =

Herbal tea

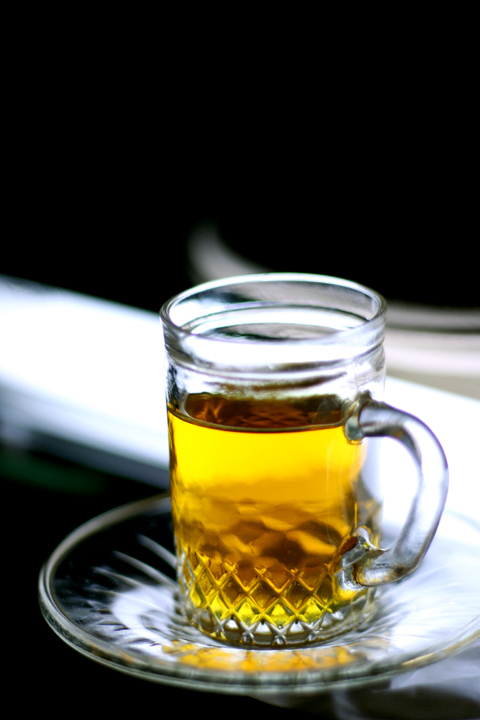
- Type: Herbal tea
- Other names: Gyepi-cha; té con canela
- Origin: Various
- Quick description: Tea made from cinnamon bark

Korean name
- Hangul: 계피차
- Hanja: 桂皮茶
- RR: gyepicha
- MR: kyep'ich'a
- IPA: kje.pʰi.tɕʰa

Cinnamon tea is a herbal tea made by infusing cinnamon bark in water.

== Regional variations ==
=== Chile ===
In Chile, té con canela ("tea with cinnamon") is made by placing a cinnamon stick into the teapot when steeping black tea.

=== Korea ===
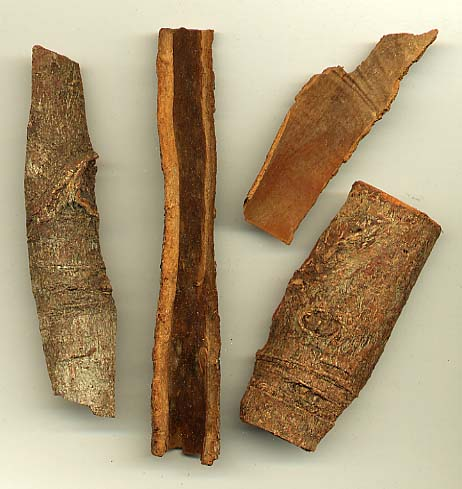
Cassia cinnamon barks used to make gyepi-cha

Gyepi-cha (계피차; 桂皮茶; "cinnamon tea") is a traditional Korean tea made from cassia cinnamon barks. Thicker sticks of cinnamon with purplish-red cross-section and strong fragrance are used. Dried cinnamon sticks are simmered either whole or sliced with a small amount of ginger. When served, the tea is strained and optionally sweetened with sugar or honey, and then is usually garnished with minced jujubes.

=== Lebanon ===
In Lebanon, shaayi bil qirfah wa'l yansoon' ("anise and cinnamon tea") is made by boiling aniseed and cinnamon (powdered or sticks) in water. Optionally, black tea may be added. The tea is strained and served with or without added sugar.

== See also ==
- Ginger tea
- Sujeonggwa – Korean cinnamon punch
