= Korean tea ceremony =

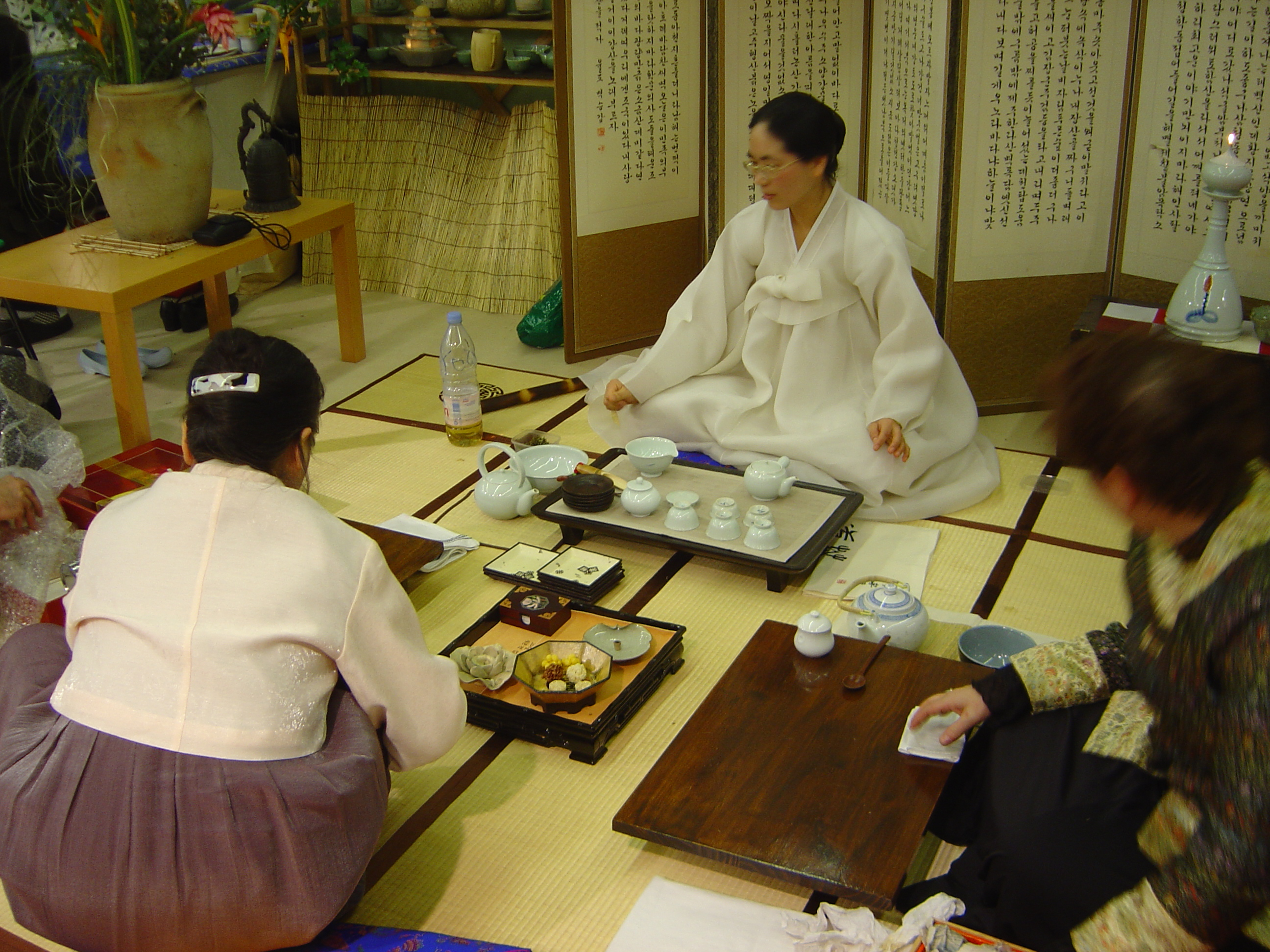

Korean name
- Hangul: 다례
- Hanja: 茶禮
- RR: darye
- MR: tarye
- IPA: [ta.ɾje]

Korean tea ceremonies (Korean: 다례) are variants of tea ceremonies practiced in Korea. Darye literally refers to "etiquette for tea" or "tea rite", and has been kept among Korean people for over a thousand years. Although records exist of court tea ceremonies during the Goryeo and early Joseon dynasties, by the time of Seonjo (1590s), it had ceased to be practiced. Korean tea is mostly herbal, and is consumed without a Japanese-style ceremony.

== History ==
=== Early history ===
The first historical record documenting the offering of tea to an ancestral god describes a rite in the year 661 in which a tea offering was made to the spirit of King Suro, the founder of the Geumgwan Gaya Kingdom (42–562). Records from the Goryeo dynasty (918–1392) show that tea offerings were made in Buddhist temples to the spirits of revered monks.

Important national rituals involving tea drinking were being presided over by the government officials of the "Tabang" department. There is at least one ritual recorded in the Goryeosa Yaeji, or The Official History of Goryeo, mentioned as part of receiving a Chinese messenger to the court.

=== Joseon dynasty ===
During the Joseon period (1392–1910), the ritualistic drinking of tea continued and was further refined. "Tabang" sustained and organized the main royal ceremony. The royal Yi family and the aristocracy used tea for simple rites, the "Day Tea Rite" was a common daytime ceremony, whereas the "Special Tea Rite" was reserved for specific occasions. They were codified in the 1474 "National Five Rites" (Gukjo Oryeui, 國朝五禮儀, 국조오례의). These terms are not found in other countries.

But plantation problems changed many ways Korean tea was governed. Unlike tea plantation areas in China or Japan, the climate of the Korean Peninsula is much colder and Tea harvesting season occurs just before the spring. So at that period, the tea tree forested areas in the mountains were still so cold and also dangerous because of wildlife. The old Korean name of tea, 설록("Seollok", 雪綠), means the first flush tea leaf was harvested on the snow field of a mountain. This situation brought much trouble during the Goryeo dynasty and Joseon dynasty.

The tea tree forested area is also the traditional Breadbasket of Korea and the tea leaf harvesting season and cereal seeding season overlap each other. Because of its value, farmers who lived around tea tree forested regions paid a steep tea tax to the king. So harvesting and treating tea leaves is pointed out as the major cause of the decrease in annual tea crop harvest. In the Goryeo dynasty, there were hundreds of appeals by many lieges and scholars such as Lee Je-hyun or Lee Gyu-bo. And finally at the end of the Goryeo dynasty, recorded in the "Yuduryurok(유두류록; 遊頭流錄)", farmers burnt or chopped their tea trees to protest against the tea tax. In the case of the Joseon dynasty, governed based on Confucianism, Tabang was sustained for tea ceremony but reduced the scale of tea production in order to protect the agricultural balance. Because of this, the development of the tea industry was prevented for a very long time. And except for Yangban and the royal family, Korean original tea drinking culture and ceremony remained in a limited area around tea tree forested regions.

However, by the middle of the Joseon dynasty, there appears to have been a decline in tea drinking except for the anniversary ceremonies. It is said, that when the Ming Commander, Yang Hao, told King Seonjo (r.1567–1601) during the Japanese invasion that he had discovered high-quality tea plants in Korea, and that "if you were to sell the tea in Liaodong, you could get a silver coin for every ten pounds of tea. Altogether, that would be enough silver to buy ten thousand horses." King Seonjo, however, replied "We do not have a tea drinking custom in our country."

=== Late-Joseon dynasty- Japanese Occupation to 1980s ===
Early Korean teahouses, called dabang, developed. An early one was established in the Sontag Hotel in Seoul, in 1902. The dabang culture grew, spreading throughout Korea during the Japanese colonial period. From 1930s to 1980s, ssanghwacha was the most popular item in the dabang culture. Not actually containing any tea extracts, it was a sweetened herbal tea. The second most popular tea served was hongcha: Western-style black tea. There was no ceremonial aspect in drinking these teas in dabang.

== Kinds of tea ==
The earliest kinds of tea used in tea ceremonies were heavily pressed cakes of black tea, the equivalent of aged pu-erh tea still popular in China. Vintages of tea were respected, and tea of great age imported from China had a certain popularity at court. However, modern Korean tea is primarily grain and herbal, not containing actual tea leaves.

== See also ==
- Korean tea
- Culture of Korea
- East Asian tea ceremony
