= Crystal Spring Tea =

Chinese canned tea

Crystal Spring Tea (Chinese: 碧泉) is a brand name of canned tea drink sold mostly in China. It was launched in the 1980s. It produces and distributes lemon tea and peach tea flavoured drinks at select key outlets. It is owned by AS Watson, the wholly owned subsidiary of Hutchison Whampoa Limited.
