= Paik's Coffee =

South Korean coffeehouse chain

- Industry: Restaurants
- Genre: Coffeehouse
- Founded: 2006; 20 years ago
- Founder: Paik Jong-won
- Headquarters: Seoul, South Korea
- Number of locations: 1,565 (2026)
- Areas served: South Korea; Philippines
- Website: paikdabang.com

Paik’s Coffee (Korean: 빽다방; RR: Ppaek dabang; lit. 'Paik’s Dabang') is a South Korean coffeehouse chain, with 1,565 coffee shops.

== History ==
Paik's Coffee started off in Nonhyeon-Dong next to Paik's restaurant. He wanted to provide bigger portions of instant coffee sticks which attracted the customers. Paik's coffee tries to break the perspective that inexpensive coffee is low in quality. Paik's coffee only uses new crop Brazil beans, which gives a heavy body with the nutty flavor of almonds and soft sweetness like milk chocolate. The beans are roasted and delivered to the shops in less than two days, and is required to be only used for two weeks. Since 2020, Paik's Coffee has launched a mobile app that is able to show the menu, order, pay, and collect stamps at once. Through Smart Order, customers are able to pick-up their drinks as soon as they arrive the shop when ordered beforehand.

In 2021, Paik's Coffee collaborated with Red Bull, releasing a drink called "Red Flame Power". This drink includes a bottle of Red Bull drink and Omija, making the taste more refreshing, cheering up the people going through COVID-19.

In 2023, Paik's Coffee opened its first branch in the Philippines at Glorietta 1, Makati.
