= Ticket (1986 film) =

- Film poster
- Directed by: Im Kwon-taek
- Written by: Song Kil-han
- Produced by: Jin Seong-man
- Starring: Kim Ji-mee; Ahn So-young; Hie Myeong; Lee Hye-young
- Cinematography: Ku Jung-mo
- Edited by: Park Sun-duk
- Music by: Shin Pyong-ha
- Production company: Jimi Film
- Release date: 23 August 1986
- Running time: 108 minutes
- Country: South Korea
- Language: Korean

Ticket is a 1986 South Korean drama film directed by Im Kwon-taek. It depicts the sometimes brutal life of Korean dabang girls. Dabangs are coffee houses in Korea and many offer outcall services in which the girls deliver coffee to customers, and sometimes extra sexual services for a price termed a "ticket". The price of the ticket is ₩25,000, which the customer pays to the proprietor of the dabang. The customer and the girl usually negotiate for extra services. Sometimes the customer will take the girl to a noraebang (karaoke room) just to sing. At other times the customer may just enjoy the company of the young lady at a meal in a restaurant. The extra meal or the noraebang are of course paid for by the customer.

== Cast ==
- Kim Ji-mee
- Ahn So-young
- Hie Myeong
- Lee Hye-young

== See also ==
- Ticket Dabang
