= Goji tea =

Traditional Chinese and Korean tea

Gugi-cha
- Type: Herbal tea
- Origin: China
- Ingredients: Goji berries or leaves

Korean name
- Hangul: 구기차
- Hanja: 枸杞茶
- RR: gugicha
- MR: kugich'a
- IPA: [ku.ɡi.tɕʰa]

Goji berry tea
- Hangul: 구기자차
- Hanja: 枸杞子茶
- RR: gugijacha
- MR: kugijach'a
- IPA: ku.ɡi.dʑa.tɕʰa

Goji leaf tea
- Hangul: 구기엽차
- Hanja: 枸杞葉茶
- RR: gugiyeopcha
- MR: kugiyŏpch'a
- IPA: [ku.ɡi.jʌp̚.tɕʰa]

Gugi-cha (Korean: 구기차; Hanja: 枸杞茶) or goji tea is a traditional Chinese and Korean tea made from dried goji berries or leaves. Traditionally, the tea was made with young goji leaves. Today, mature leaves or, more commonly, berries are used. The tea made with berries may be called gugija-cha (구기자차; 枸杞子茶) or goji berry tea, while the tea made with leaves is referred to as gugiyeop-cha (구기엽차; 枸杞葉茶) or goji leaf tea.

== Preparation ==
Tea using berries is prepared with around 20–25 g (0.71–0.88 oz) of dried goji berries simmered in two cups of water, with various possible flavorings or sweeteners added. Leaf tea may be prepared with around 2–3 g (0.071–0.106 oz) of dried leaves infused in a cup of hot water.

== See also ==
- Omija-cha
