= Smoked plum =

Smoked fruit of Asian plums

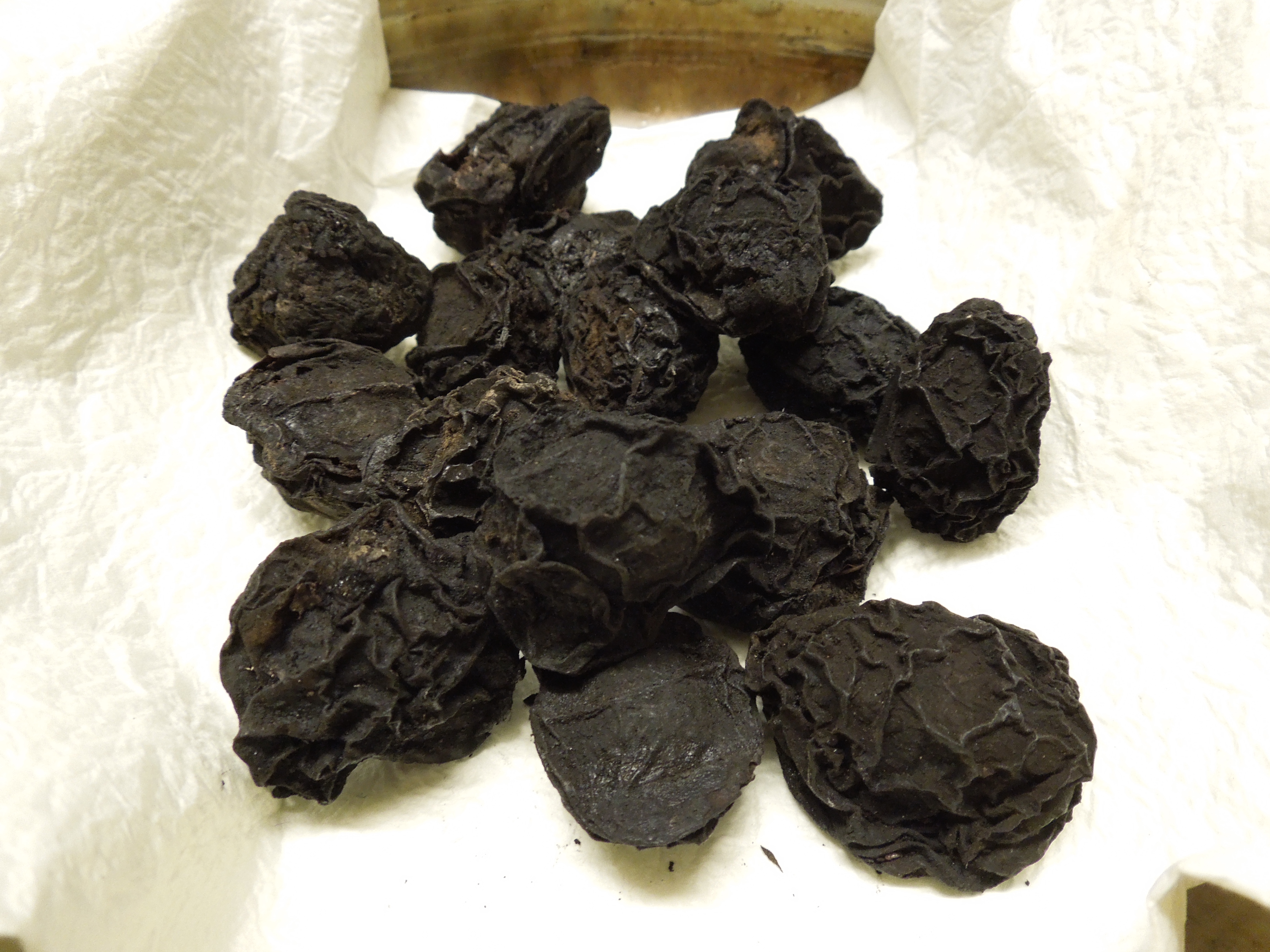
Smoked plums

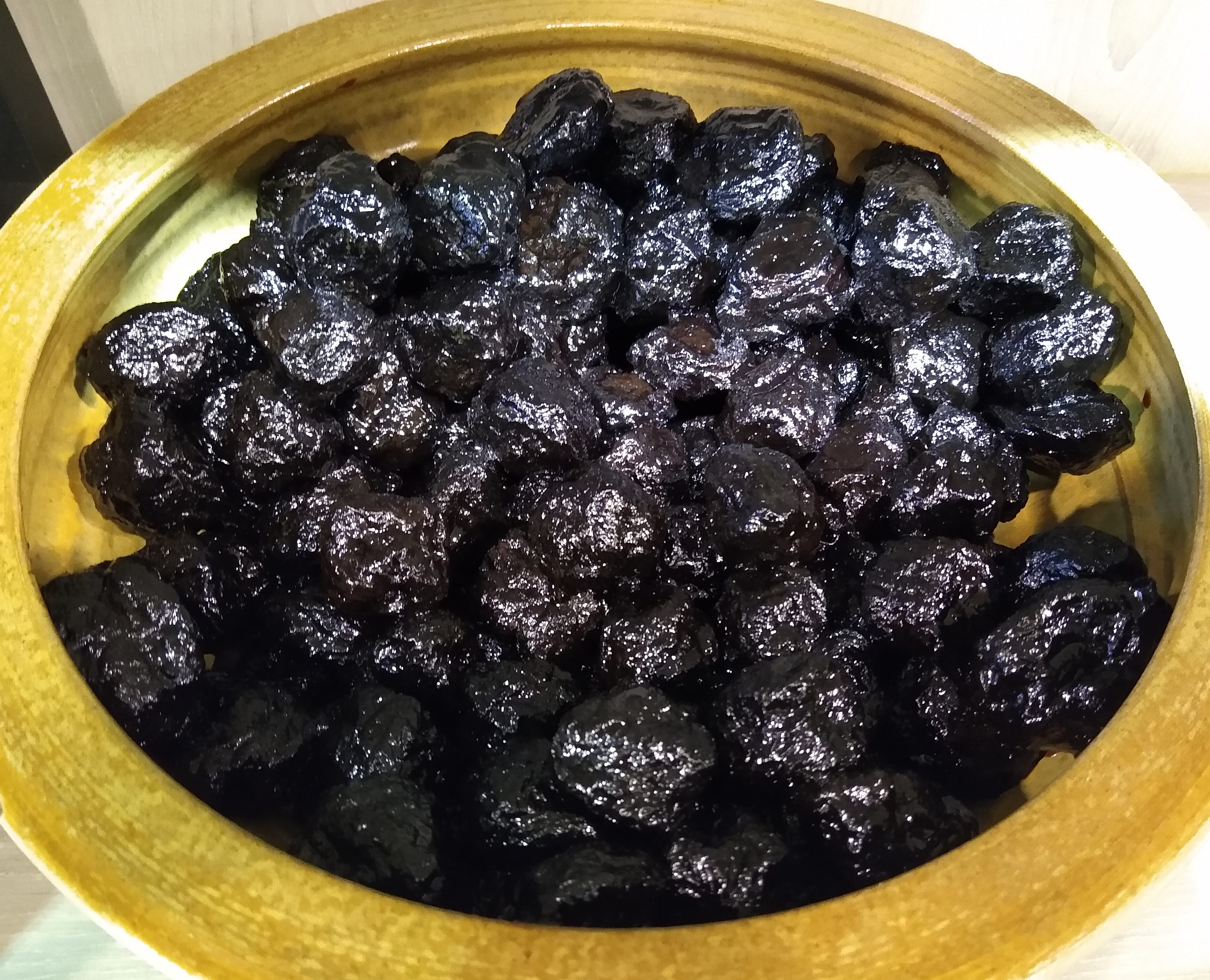
Smoked plums

Smoked plum is the smoked fruit of Asian plums, used in East Asian cuisine and medicine. It is called wūméi (烏梅) in Mandarin, omae (오매; 烏梅) in Korean, ubai (烏梅; うばい) in Japanese, and Ô mai in Vietnamese.

== Overview ==
Smoked plums, matte black to dark brown, with a rugged surface, have a unique flavor with a sour taste. The fruit is spherical or oblate, around 2–3 centimetres (0.79–1.18 in) long and 1.5–2 centimetres (0.59–0.79 in) in diameter. The surface is wrinkled, with the round stem-end underside. The fruit kernel is hard, olate, yellowish brown, 1–1.4 centimetres (0.39–0.55 in) long, 1 centimetre (0.39 in) wide, and 0.5 centimetres (0.20 in) thick, with a dotted surface. The seed is flat obloid and light yellow.

== Production ==
Unripe plums are picked in early summer, smoked, and dried at 40 °C (104 °F).

== Use ==
=== Cuisine ===
In China, smoked plums are used to make suānméitāng, a sour plum drink.

In Korea, smoked plums are used to make traditional teas and drinks such as omae-cha (smoked plum tea) and jeho-tang (medicinal summer drink).

=== Medicine ===
Latin (pharmaceutical) name for smoked plums is Mume Fructus.

In Traditional Korean medicine, smoked plums are considered conductant for the liver channel, spleen channel, lung channel, and large intestine channel. It is used to treat ascariasis, vomiting, cough, and diarrhea. It is reported to relieve phlegm, inhibit intestinal motility, and fight bacteria in pharmacologic experiments.

=== Dyeing ===
In Japan, the extract of smoked plums (ubai) is used as a mordant for the natural red dye derived from safflower (benibana).

== See also ==
- List of smoked foods
