= Vietnamese lotus tea =

Type of green tea

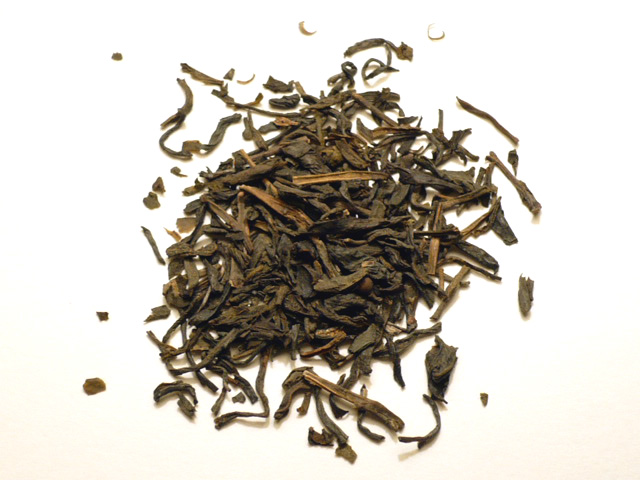
- Type: Green
- Other names: Trà sen, Chè sen, Chè ướp sen
- Origin: Vietnam
- Quick description: Green tea scented with lotus (Nelumbo nucifera)

Vietnamese lotus tea (trà sen, chè sen, or chè ướp sen) is a traditional Vietnamese scented tea made by infusing green tea with the fragrance of the lotus flower (Nelumbo nucifera). It is considered one of the most refined artisanal teas in Vietnam and is often associated with cultural ceremonies, hospitality, and seasonal traditions, particularly in Hanoi.

The most renowned variety is produced around West Lake (Hồ Tây), where lotus flowers with a strong natural fragrance are cultivated specifically for tea scenting.

== Production ==
The tea is made by allowing green tea leaves to absorb the lotus flower's natural aroma through a meticulous scenting process. This is traditionally done using one of several methods:

- Stuffing green tea leaves into a fresh lotus flower and leaving them overnight
- Separating the stamen or specifically the aromatic anthers (commonly referred to in Vietnam as gạo sen, or "lotus rice"), and then:
  - Layering them with tea leaves in enclosed containers
  - Gently heating or drying the tea to stabilize the absorbed fragrance

These steps can be repeated multiple times to deepen the aroma. In high-quality production, it is estimated that approximately one thousand lotus flowers may be required to scent one kilogram of tea.

=== West Lake tradition ===
In Hanoi, especially in the Quảng An area near West Lake, lotus tea scenting is regarded as a seasonal artisanal craft practiced during the summer lotus bloom. Harvesting typically takes place in the early morning hours, when lotus buds are still partially closed and retain their highest concentration of fragrance.

Artisans often select half-open buds (hàm tiếu), believed to contain the most balanced and concentrated aroma. The most valued component used in scenting is the lotus "rice" (gạo sen), referring to the small white anthers attached to the stamens, which hold the flower's essential oils.

Traditional dry-scenting (ướp sen khô) involves repeatedly layering tea leaves with freshly collected lotus anthers over multiple cycles. Each cycle may last one to several days, after which the spent floral material is removed and replaced. This process is typically repeated between five and eight times, and may take several weeks to complete, depending on environmental conditions such as humidity and temperature.

The base tea used is usually high-quality green tea capable of absorbing fragrance effectively, such as teas from Thái Nguyên or high-mountain regions producing Shan Tuyết tea. The combination of suitable base tea and careful scenting technique is considered essential for achieving a balanced final product, where both tea flavor and lotus aroma are preserved.

An alternative method known as fresh scenting (ướp sen xổi) involves placing tea leaves directly inside a whole lotus flower for a shorter infusion period, typically 24–48 hours. While less complex, this method produces a lighter and more immediate fragrance and is more commonly used for daily consumption.

Many modern commercial products may use artificial flavoring or simplified scenting techniques to replicate the lotus aroma, resulting in lower production costs but generally less complexity in flavor.

== Brewing ==
Lotus tea is typically brewed at lower temperatures than standard green tea, around 70 °C (160 °F), for under two minutes. High-quality lotus tea can be steeped multiple times, with each infusion gradually revealing different layers of aroma and taste.

== Cultural significance ==
Lotus tea holds cultural significance in Vietnam as a symbol of refinement, purity, and harmony with nature. It is often served during formal gatherings, festivals, and as a gesture of hospitality. The labor-intensive traditional production methods, especially those associated with West Lake, contribute to its reputation as one of Vietnam's most prestigious teas.
