= Hakrim Dabang =

Historic cafe in Seoul, South Korea

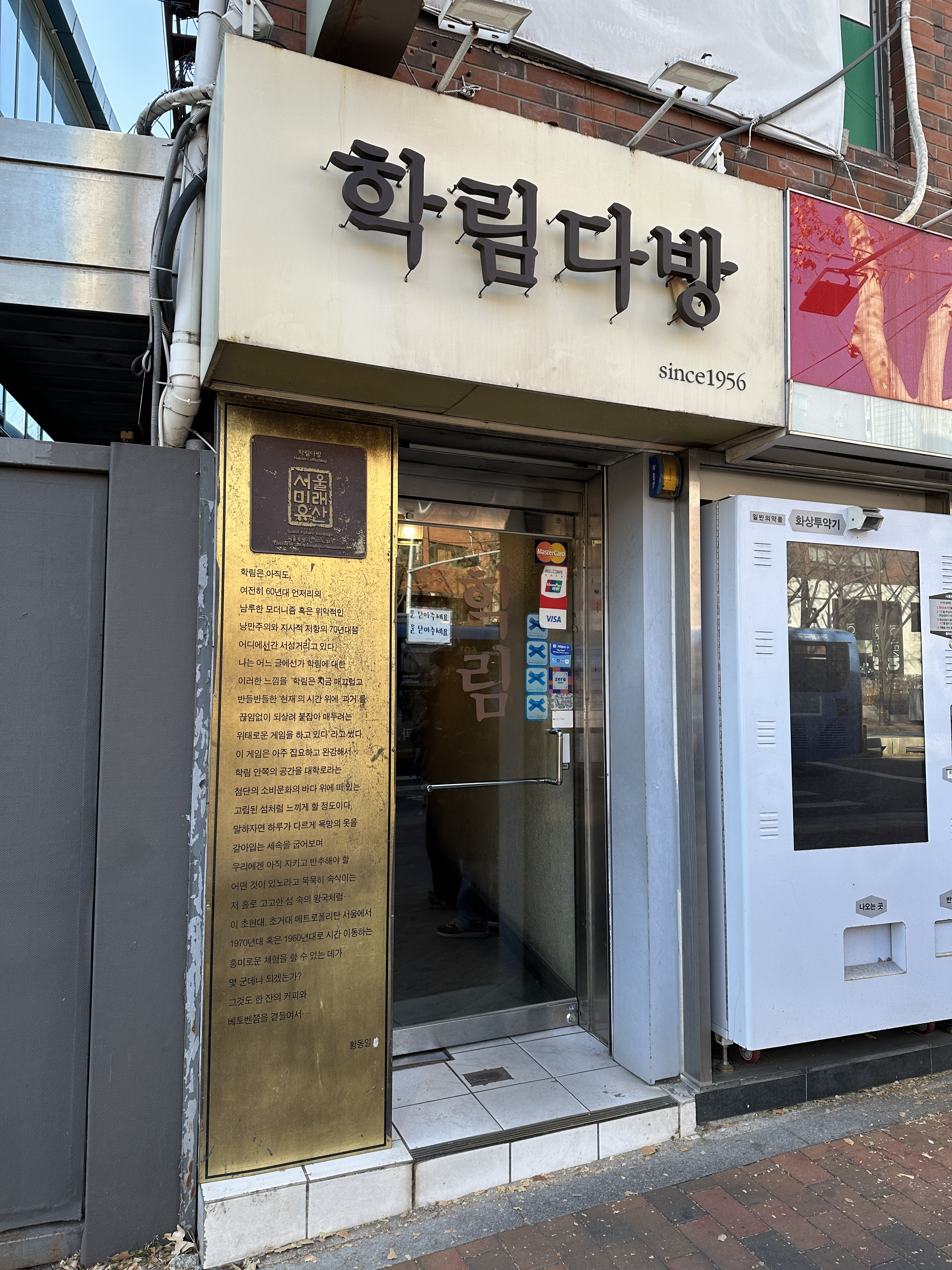
- Hakrim Dabang (2025)

General information
- Coordinates: 37.5818°N 127.0016°E
- Designations

Seoul Future Heritage
- Reference no.: 2013-267

Restaurant information
- Established: 1956; 69 years ago
- Food type: Coffeehouse
- Location: 119 Daehangno, Jongno District, Seoul, South Korea
- Website: www.instagram.com/hakrim_coffee/ (in Korean)

Hakrim Dabang (Korean: 학림다방; Hanja: 學林茶房; RR: Hangnim dabang) is a historic dabang (cafe) on Daehangno in Jongno District, Seoul, South Korea. It opened in 1956, and is considered among the oldest active cafes in South Korea (after Samyang Dabang), and the oldest active one in Seoul.

The dabang has been frequented by many prominent figures in South Korean culture and the arts. It has featured in South Korean cinema and Korean dramas such as My Love from the Star, and remains a popular spot for both local students and tourists. It was made a Seoul Future Heritage in 2013. It is classified as an Oraegage, a store of historic value, by the Seoul Metropolitan Government.

== Description ==
The dabang has two floors and serves a variety of foods and drinks. It sells coffee and tea, as well as cakes, parfaits, and ice cream. Its homemade cream cheese cake is reportedly popular. The dabang is decorated to evoke nostalgia, in reflection of its long history and prominent place in the city's culture.

== History ==
The dabang was first founded by Shin Seon-hui (신선희) in 1956. It got its name from a school festival held by the then-nearby Seoul National University (SNU). The dabang was popular with SNU students; it became a regular hangout for prominent figures in the culture and arts world, including Cheon Sang-byeong, Yi Cheong-jun, Hwang Ji-u, Kim Seungok, and more. Students reportedly nicknamed the cafe "the 25th classroom", equating its significance in the exchange of ideas to the 24 classrooms of SNU. SNU moved to Gwanak District in 1975, and traffic was reduced. In 1981, the dabang became the namesake and site of the Hakrim incident. A student group (전국민주학생연맹; 전민학련) involved in pro-democracy activities during the Chun Doo-hwan administration held their first meeting in the dabang. They were eventually arrested, imprisoned, and tortured.

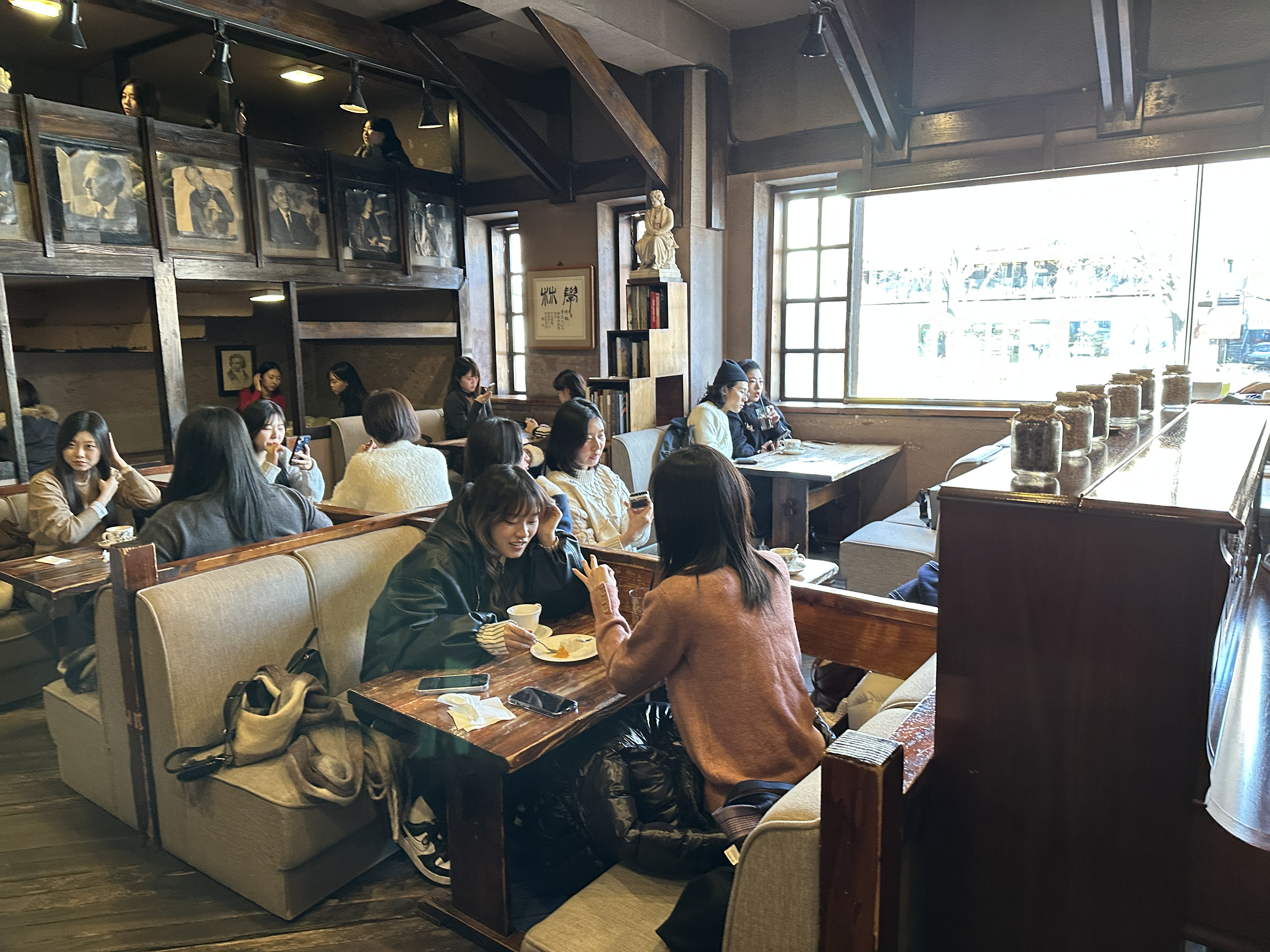
The interior (2025)

In 1987, Lee Chung-ryeol (이충렬) became the fourth person to run the business; he was still the owner by 2017. Around the time of the acquisition, Lee felt the business had been stagnating. It lost many of its regular customers and its facilities were seen as shabby. It also had unusual elements; the cafe had waiters that wore bowties while serving customers. He began significant restoration work in 1988. Lee also went to Japan at the suggestion of one of his Japanese customers to learn about coffee making; he also purchased a coffee roaster there. During the 1989 June Democratic Struggle, Lee reportedly offered assistance and shelters to student protestors fleeing persecution and tear gas. The cafe came to host private parties for the local universities, and again became a popular social space for students. Eventually, the dabang became successful and crowded enough that they decided to expand. They converted a nearby space normally used for coffee roasting into a small cafe meant for the previous regulars. For its 50th anniversary in 2006, they held an event where former regulars from the arts shared stories, gave dance performances, and played music.

By 2020, the brand was selling its own coffee beans and drip bag coffee.

The dabang has since featured in South Korean cinema and Korean dramas. The popular drama My Love from the Star was partially filmed in the dabang; this led to a boom in tourism for the cafe. In 2020, Lee, also a professional photographer, held an exhibition of various photos related to the cafe that he had taken over time. A number of people in the photographs later became prominent actors.

== See also ==
- Samyang Dabang – the oldest dabang in South Korea
