= Ticket Dabang =

Ticket Dabang (티켓 다방) is a variant of a dabang, where the delivery woman travels directly to the client and then provides a sexual service upon arrival.

== See also ==
- Ticket (1985 film)
- You Are My Sunshine (2005 film)
- Call girl
- Prostitution in South Korea
