= Jaekseol tea =

Traditional Korean black tea

Jaekseol-cha
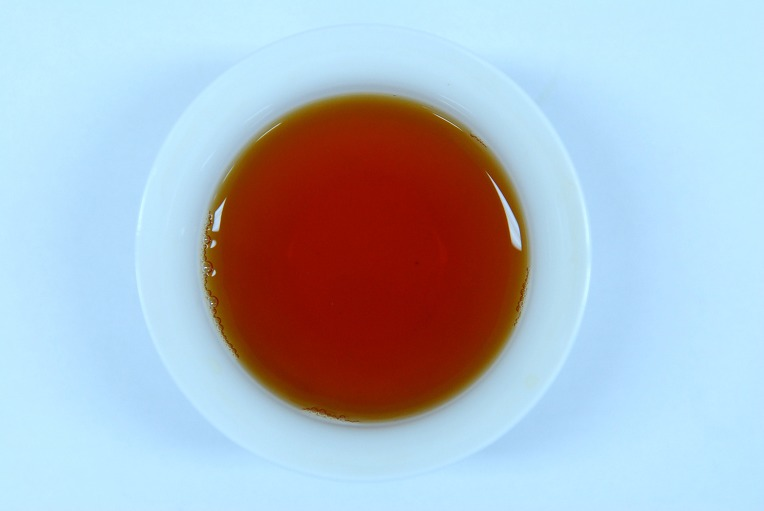
- Type: Black tea
- Origin: Hadong, Korea
- Ingredients: Camellia sinensis

Korean name
- Hangul: 잭설차
- Hanja: (*雀)舌茶
- RR: jaekseolcha
- MR: chaeksŏlch'a
- IPA: [tɕɛk.sʌl.tɕʰa]

Jaekseol-cha (Korean: 잭설차) is a traditional Korean tea. It is a black tea produced in Hadong County, South Gyeongsang Province, South Korea.

== Gallery ==
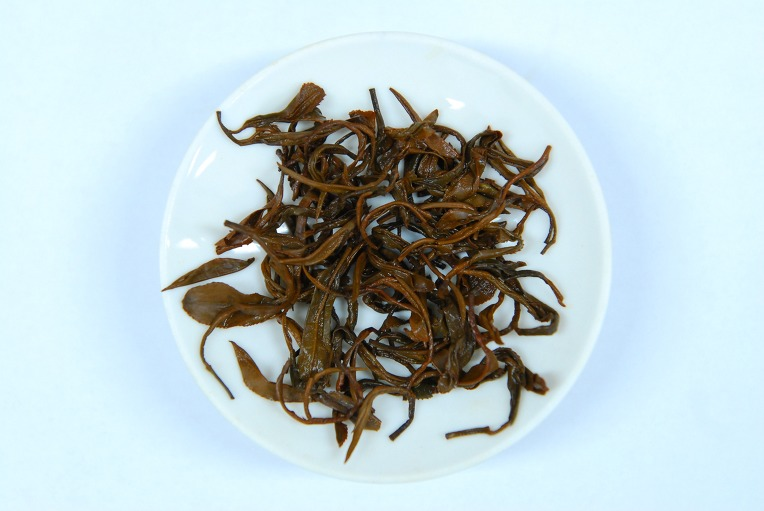
Jaekseol-cha tea leaves

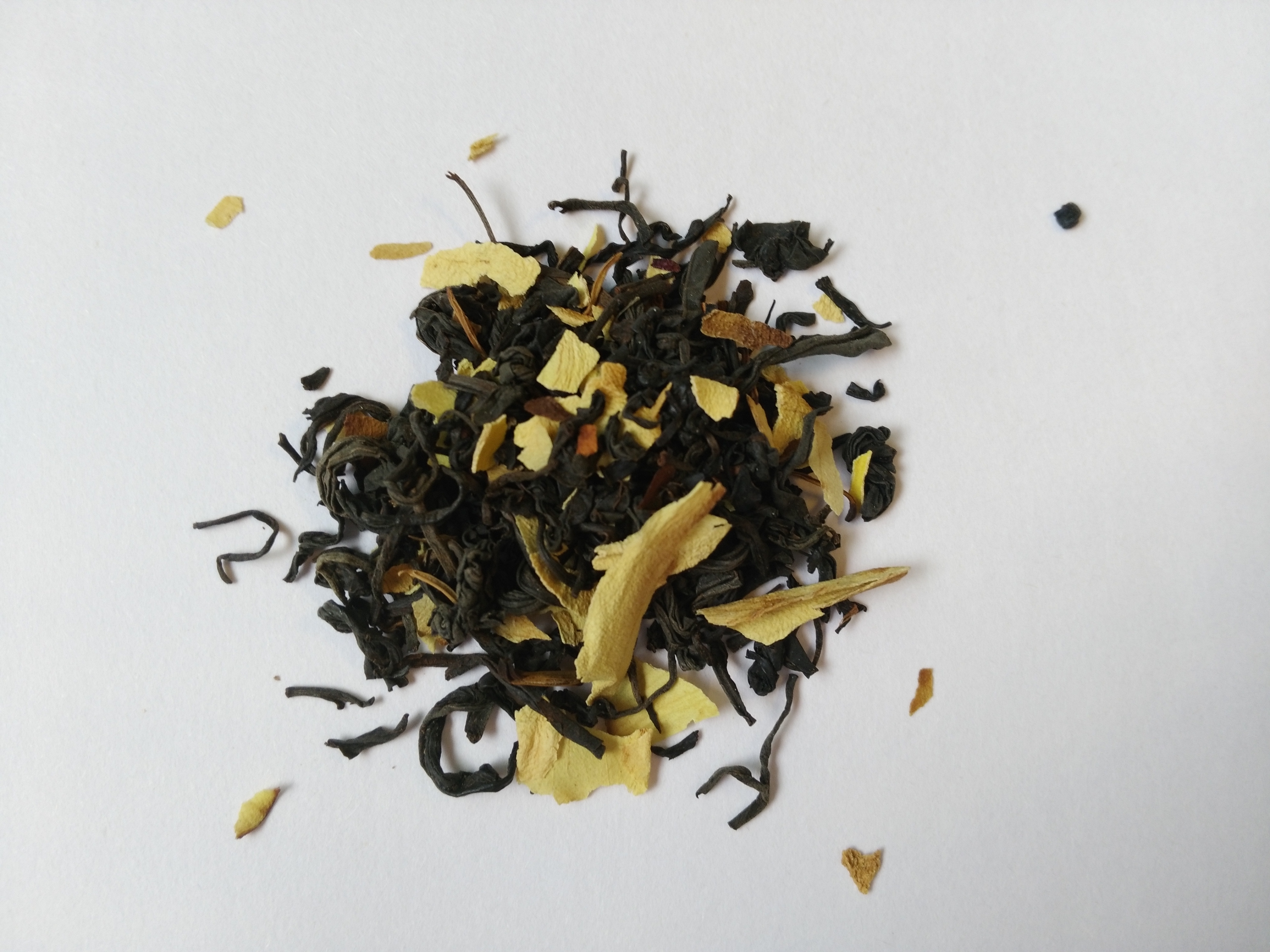
Jaekseol tea blended with magnolia petals
