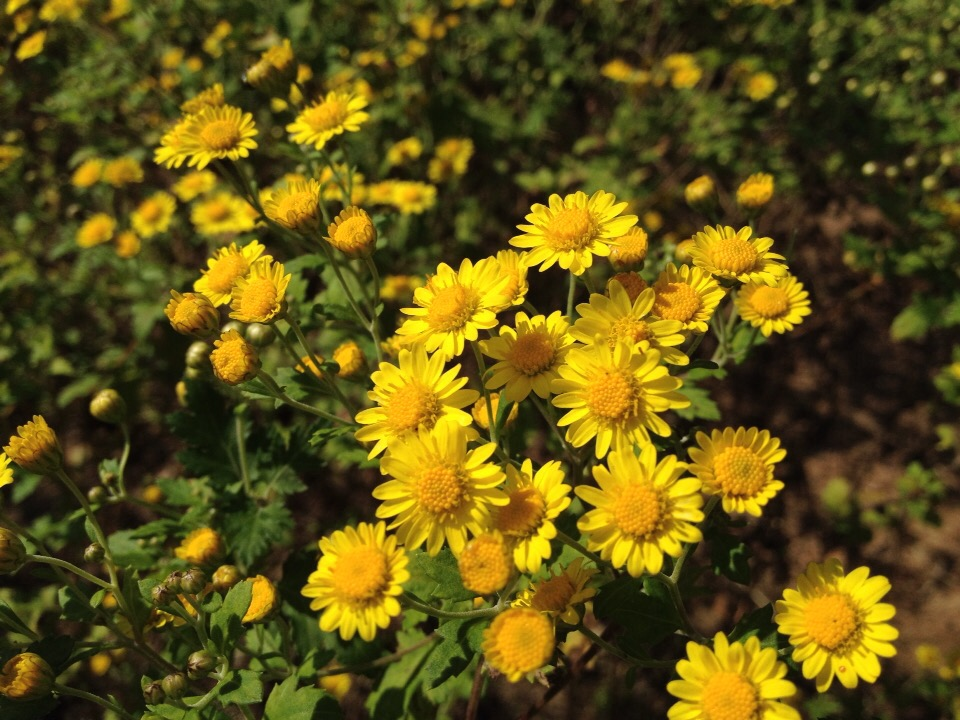

Scientific classification
- Kingdom: Plantae
- Clade: Tracheophytes
- Clade: Angiosperms
- Clade: Eudicots
- Clade: Asterids
- Order: Asterales
- Family: Asteraceae
- Genus: Chrysanthemum
- Species: C. lavandulifolium

Binomial name
- Chrysanthemum lavandulifolium (Fisch. ex Trautv.) Makino

Synonyms
- Chrysanthemum bellum Grüning; Chrysanthemum boreale Makino; Chrysanthemum indicum var. boreale Makino, nom. inval.; Chrysanthemum jucundum Nakai & Kitag.; Chrysanthemum namikawanum Kitam.; Chrysanthemum seticuspe (Maxim.) Hand.-Mazz.; Chrysanthemum seticuspe f. boreale (Makino) H.Ohashi & Yonek.; Chrysanthemum wilsonianum Hand.-Mazz.; Dendranthema boreale (Makino) Y.Ling ex Kitam.; Dendranthema lavandulifolium (Fisch. ex Trautv.) Y.Ling & C.Shih; Dendranthema lavandulifolium var. glabriusculum (Ling) Kitam.; Dendranthema lavandulifolium var. seticuspe (Maxim.) C.Shih; Dendranthema lavandulifolium var. sianensis (Kitam.) Kitam.; Dendranthema seticuspe (Maxim.) Kitam.; Pyrethrum lavandulifolium Fisch. ex Trautv.; Pyrethrum seticuspe Maxim.

= Chrysanthemum lavandulifolium =

Species of flowering plant

Chrysanthemum lavandulifolium is a flowering plant within the family Asteraceae and the genus Chrysanthemum. It is a perennial flowering plant that is often noted because of its yellow flowers. It has 18 chromosomes at the diploid stage.

== Description ==
The plant grows up to 100–150 centimetres (39–59 in) tall and consists of a herb and its flower. The herb is erect, and the flowers have yellow sepals and multiple carpals. The herb has a green, oblong leaf with pinnate venation. These leaves are about 5–7 centimetres (2–3 in) long and 4–6 cm wide. The leaf blade is broad, while the base is suddenly narrowed and of an ovate or lanceolate lobed shape. The leaves are in alternate arrangement throughout the stem. In addition, it has a broad sinus base with "dorsifixed pubescence" underneath. The petiole is about 1–2 cm long. The rhizome is short, while the stem is erect, long branched, and colored white pubescent. There are only a few stem leaves.

The flowers grow in a corymb-style head and are terminal. They also have yellow heads that contain multiple carpals; these stretch from 14–15 mm in diameter. They also contain three or four oblong bracts that have soft tissue and are elliptical and tipped. These bracts have hemispherical involucre or coverings. In addition, the yellow corollas of the flower are about 5–7 mm long and 1.5–2 mm wide These heads stretch to about 1.5 cm in diameter. These bisexual florets have obtuse and irregular anther bases. They have pistillate ray florets that can be yellow or white. From these florets, they produce achenes, which are indehiscent and angled. The pappus, a modified calyx, is not present or is extremely small.

== Taxonomy ==
The species was first described in 1872 by Ernst von Trautvetter as Pyrethrum lavandulifolium, with the name attributed to Friedrich von Fischer. (Note: The epithet was originally published as "lavandulaefolium". Under Article 60.10 of the International Code of Nomenclature for algae, fungi, and plants, the letters "ae" in epithets like lavandulaefolium are to be corrected to "i", here giving lavandulifolium.) In 1909, Tomitaro Makino placed the species in Chrysanthemum when describing Chrysanthemum boreale (which he had mentioned as a variety of C. indicum in 1902). He noted that C. boreale "came very near" to C. lavandulifolium. The two are now treated as one species.

When it became understood that Linnaeus's Chrysanthemum, which was typified by a Mediterranean annual species, was distinct from the largely Asian perennial species, these latter, including C. lavandulifolium and C. boreale, were initially given names in the genus Dendranthema. In 1999, the genus name Chrysanthemum was conserved for the Asian species, so the name Chrysanthemum lavandulifolium became acceptable again.

== Distribution and habitat ==
C. lavandulifolium naturally occurs or is native to regions of eastern Asia such as Korea, Japan, and China. In China, it is found in the provinces of Gansu, Sichuan, and Yunnan. In Japan, it is found primarily in Honshu and Kyushu. In Korea, it is found in Gyeongsangbuk, Gangwon, and Chungcheongbuk. Chrysanthemums may have been introduced to Japan by the Chinese in the eighth century AD.

C. lavandulifolium, a perennial plant, grows well in warm climates around East Asia. It flowers from October to November. The plant grows well on moist clayey soils in full sun. It is also quite immune to high temperatures and lack of moisture.

== Diseases ==
This particular type of chrysanthemum is noted to be affected by black plight. In addition, in Korea and other Asian countries, C. lavandulifolium has contracted a downy mildew infection caused by Paraperonospora minor. The fungi-like agents grow on leaves and turn them to a yellowish color, and the plant eventually wilts until it dies out. This study was the first to find C. lavandulifolium with this infection.

== Uses ==
In Korean traditional medicine, C. lavandulifolium has been used to treat vertigo, a type of dizziness. In addition, its flowers have been used as an antipyretic.
