= Dohwa-cha =

Traditional Korean beverage

Peach blossom tea
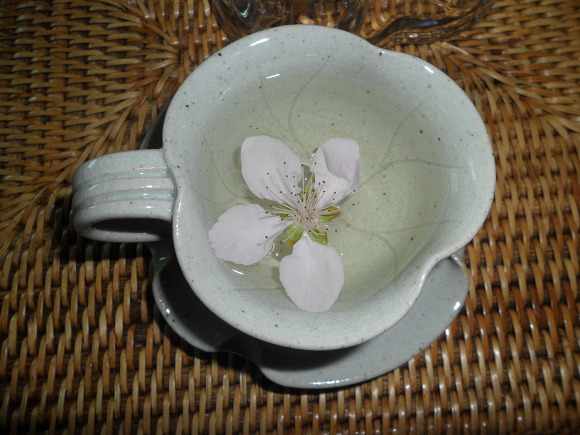
- Type: Herbal tea
- Other names: Dohwa-cha
- Origin: Korea
- Quick description: Tea made from peach blossom
- Temperature: 60–80 °C (140–176 °F)
- Time: 3‒4 minutes

Korean name
- Hangul: 도화차
- Hanja: 桃花茶
- RR: dohwacha
- MR: tohwach'a
- IPA: [to.ɦwa.tɕʰa]

Dohwa-cha (Korean: 도화차; Hanja: 桃花茶) or peach flower tea is a traditional Korean tea made from dried peach flowers. It is believed that dohwa-cha helps treating constipation and calculus.

== Preparation ==
Dohwa-cha can be prepared with 15–20 grams (0.53–0.71 oz) of dried peach blossoms boiled in 500 millilitres (18 imp fl oz; 17 US fl oz) water. The flowers are harvested during the springtime, dried in shade, and kept in a paper bag. Stamens are removed before being dried. Dohwa-cha usually comes pre-made. It is recommended to steep the buds for 5 to 10 min after adding to water. Times may vary depending on preference of strength.
