= Lotus tea =

Beverage made from the lotus plant

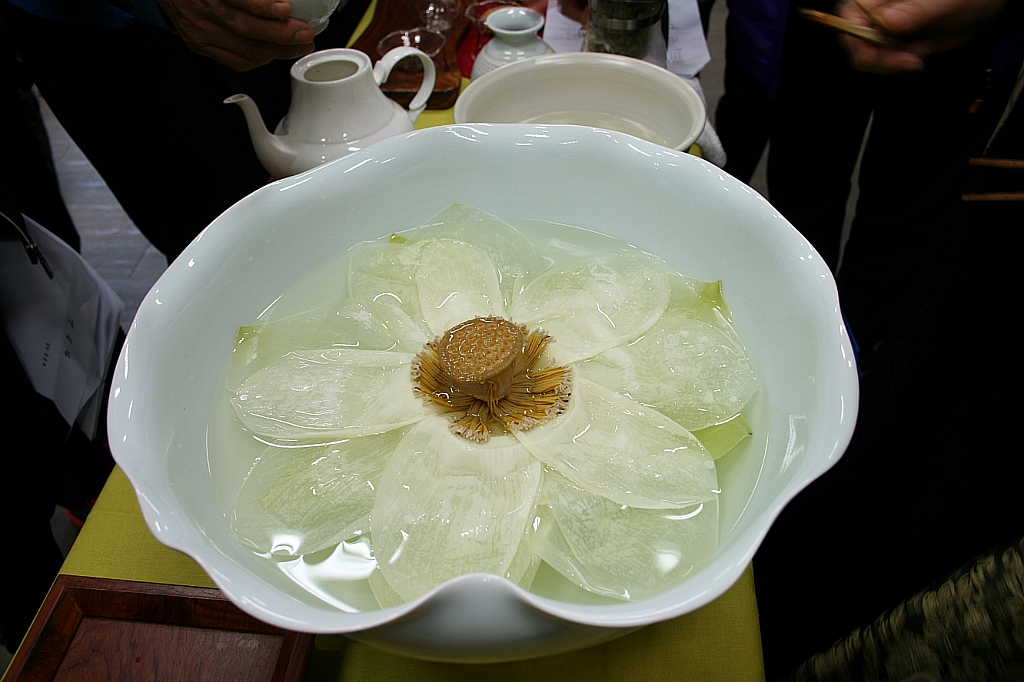
- Type: Tea & Herbal tea
- Other names: Trà sen; liánchá; yeoncha
- Origin: Asia
- Quick description: Tea associated with the lotus plant, including scented teas and herbal infusions made using lotus flowers or other parts of the lotus.
- Temperature: Varies
- Time: Varies

Lotus tea is a broad term that refers to two distinct categories of tea associated with the lotus plant. The first is Vietnamese lotus tea—a traditional scented tea made by scenting premium loose-leaf green tea with the fragrance of lotus flowers. The second refers to lotus herbal teas and infusions, which are prepared directly from different parts of the lotus plant itself, including the leaves, flowers, roots, fruit, seeds, and plumules.

Although both are commonly referred to as lotus tea, they differ fundamentally in composition and tradition. Vietnamese lotus tea uses Camellia sinensis as its tea base and relies on lotus fragrance for scenting, while lotus herbal teas contain no true tea leaves and are instead brewed entirely from parts of the lotus plant. It is known as liánchá (莲茶, 蓮茶, [ljɛ̌n.ʈʂʰǎ]) in Chinese and yeoncha (연차; 蓮茶; [jʌn.tɕʰa]) in Korean.

== Vietnamese Lotus Tea ==
Vietnamese lotus tea, known as trà sen in Vietnamese, is one of the most distinctive scented tea traditions in Vietnam. It is created by combining fine green tea with the fragrance of lotus flowers, traditionally using the stamens and pollen-bearing anthers of the blossom during the scenting process.

Among all forms of Vietnamese lotus tea, Trà sen Tây Hồ (West Lake Lotus Tea) is considered the most celebrated. It is traditionally crafted in the Quảng An area around West Lake (Hanoi) using the rare Sen Bách Diệp—the hundred-petaled lotus indigenous to the lake. For centuries, this lotus has occupied a special place in the cultural imagination of Hanoi and has frequently appeared in Vietnamese poetry, literature, and folk songs.

Traditional West Lake lotus tea is typically scented using carefully selected green teas from renowned Vietnamese tea-growing regions such as Thái Nguyên and the northern mountains. The tea is layered repeatedly with fresh lotus stamens and anthers, often referred to as gạo sen ("lotus rice"), allowing the leaves to gradually absorb the flower's fragrance over multiple scenting cycles.

The craft is highly labor-intensive and deeply seasonal. Depending on the method and quality level, producing a single batch may require thousands of lotus blossoms and many days of repeated scenting and drying. Much of the process remains handmade and preserved by a small number of artisan families in Hanoi.

Historically, lotus tea occupied an important place in the refined tea culture of northern Vietnam and was associated with scholars, nobles, poets, and ceremonial gatherings. Because of its rarity, craftsmanship, and cultural prestige, West Lake lotus tea has often been described in Vietnam as "Thiên cổ đệ nhất trà"—"The First Tea Under Heaven."

== Lotus Herbal Teas and Infusions ==
The term "lotus tea" may also refer to herbal teas and infusions prepared directly from different parts of the lotus plant rather than from Camellia sinensis. These teas are widely consumed across East and Southeast Asia and include preparations made from lotus leaves, flowers, fruit, seeds, plumules, and roots.

== Lotus leaf tea ==
Lotus leaf tea, called yeonnip-cha (연잎차 [jʌn.nip̚.tɕʰa]) in Korean, is a tea made from young leaves of lotus. Leaves for lotus tea are often heat-treated (either by steaming or roasting) before being dried. Sometimes, fresh leaves are also infused as tea. 6–12 g (0.21–0.42 oz) of dried leaves or 15–20 g (0.53–0.71 oz) or fresh leaves are simmered in 600 ml (21 imp fl oz; 20 US fl oz) of water over low heat to produce two to three cups tea.

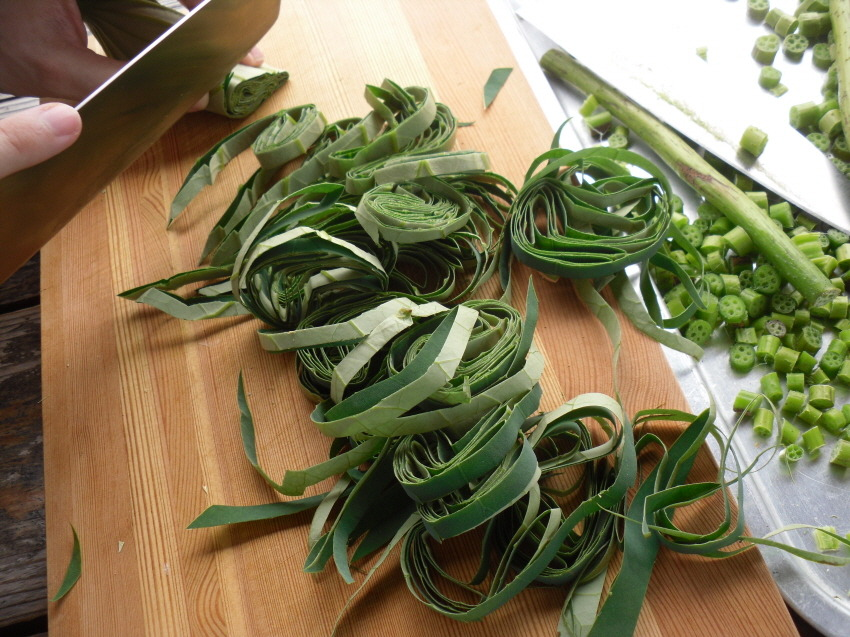
Slicing lotus leaves

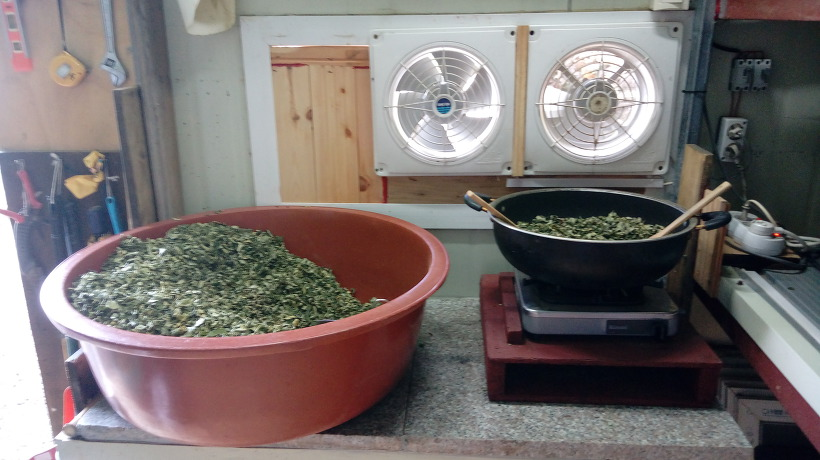
Roasting lotus leaves

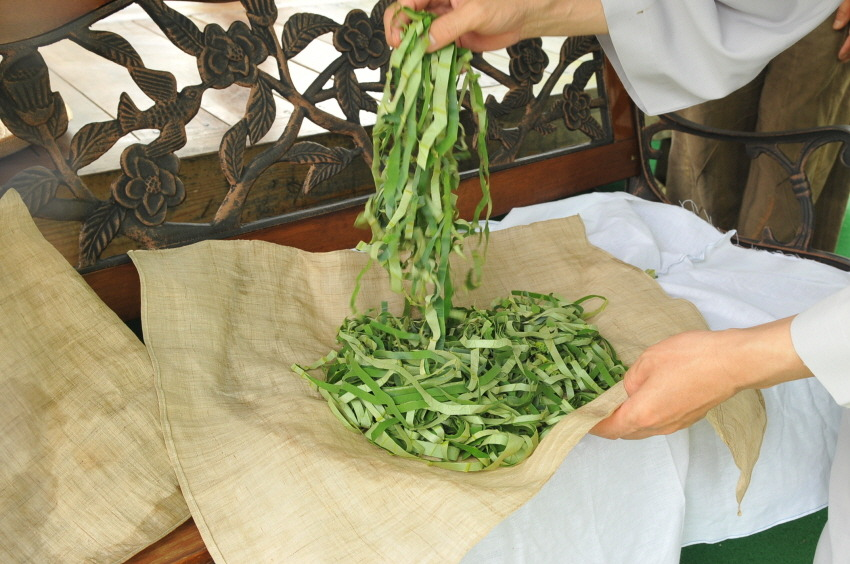
Steamed lotus leaves

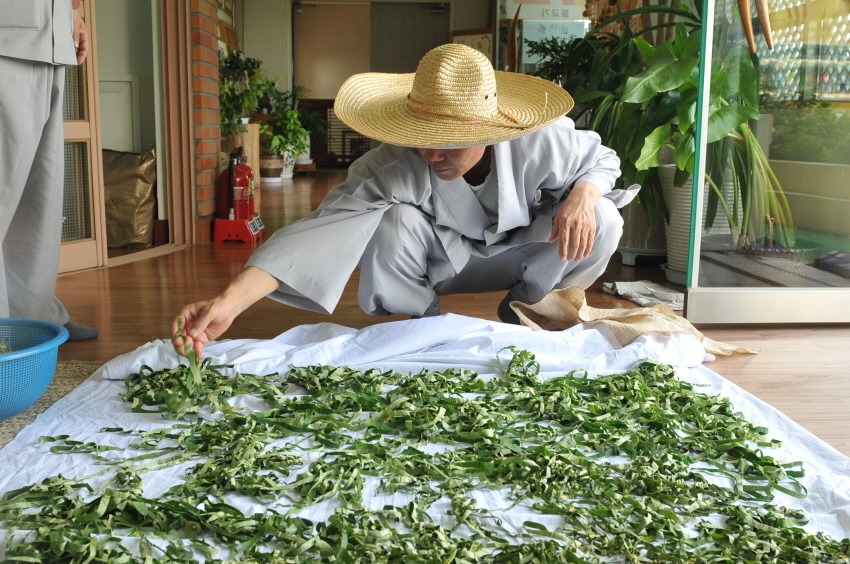
Drying steamed lotus leaves

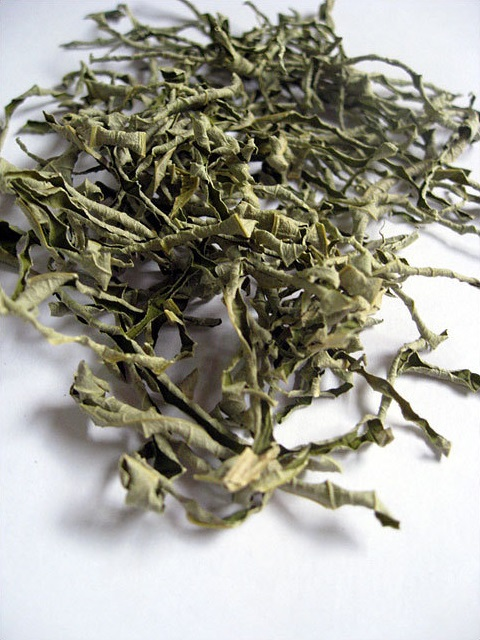
Dried steamed lotus leaves

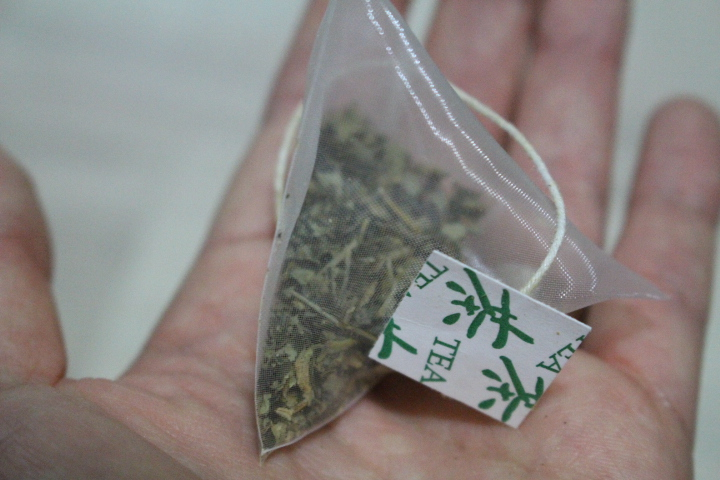
A tea bag of lotus leaf tea

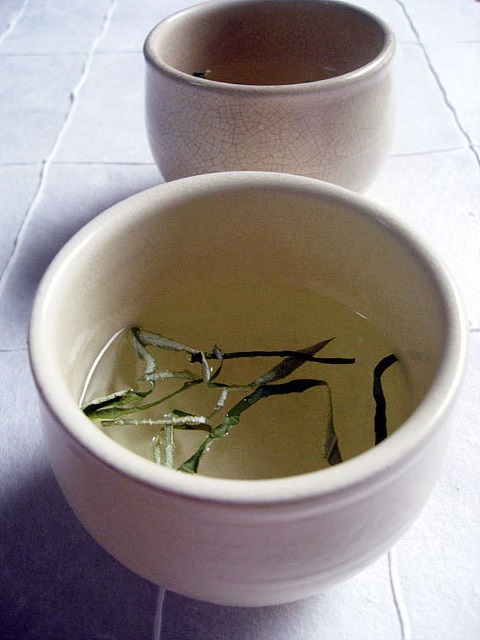
Lotus leaf tea

== Lotus flower tea ==
Lotus flower tea, called yeonkkot-cha (연꽃차, [jʌn.k͈ot̚.tɕʰa]) or yeonhwa-cha (연화차; 蓮花茶; [jʌn.ɦwa.tɕʰa]) in Korean, is a tea made from lotus flower. Often, a fresh whole flower is used to make tea. In Korean temple cuisine, this type of lotus flower tea symbolizes the blossoming of Buddhist enlightenment. Otherwise, 4–8 g (0.14–0.28 oz) of dried petals can be simmered in 600 ml (21 imp fl oz; 20 US fl oz) of water over low heat to make two to three cups or of tea.

== Lotus fruit tea ==
Lotus fruit tea, called yeonbang-cha (연방차; 蓮房茶; [jʌn.baŋ.tɕʰa]) in Korean, is a tea made by infusing dried lotus fruits.

== Lotus seed tea ==
Lotus seed tea, called yeonbap-cha (연밥차, [jʌn.bap̚.tɕʰa]), yeonssi-cha (연씨차, [jʌn.s͈i.tɕʰa]), or yeonja-cha (연자차; 蓮子茶; [jʌn.dʑa.tɕʰa]) in Korean, is a tea made by infusing lotus seeds, which are steamed and dried. For two to three cups of tea, 5–10 g (0.18–0.35 oz) of lotus seeds are simmered in 600 ml (21 imp fl oz; 20 US fl oz) water over low heat.

== Lotus plumule tea ==
Lotus plumule tea, called liánxīn-chá (莲芯茶, 蓮芯茶, [ljɛ̌n.ɕín.ʈʂʰǎ]) or liánzixīn-chá (莲子芯茶, 蓮子芯茶, [ljɛ̌n.tsi.ɕín.ʈʂʰǎ]) in Chinese and trà tim sen (Northern: [tɕâː.tīm.sɛ̄n], Southern: [ʈâː.tīm.ʂɛ̄ŋ]) in Vietnamese, is an infusion made from lotus plumules.

== Lotus root tea ==
Lotus root tea, called yeongeun-cha (연근차; 蓮根茶; [jʌn.ɡɯn.tɕʰa]) in Korean, is a tea made by infusing dried lotus root (rhizome) slices or mixing lotus root powder in hot water. Lotus root powder for tea can either be made by drying lotus root juice, or grinding dried lotus root slices into powder.

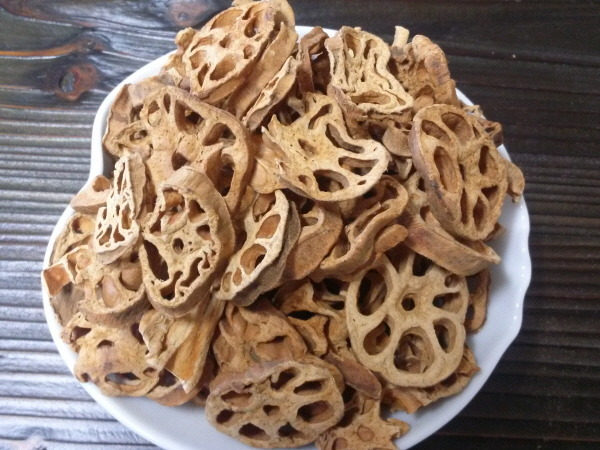
Dried lotus root slices

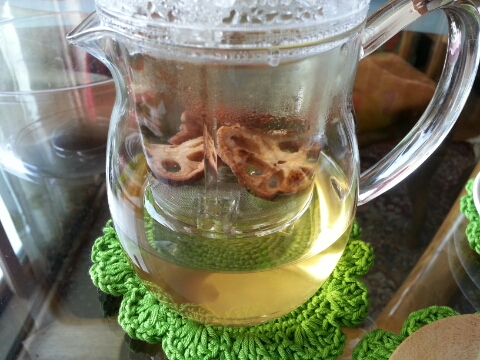
Infusing dried lotus root slices

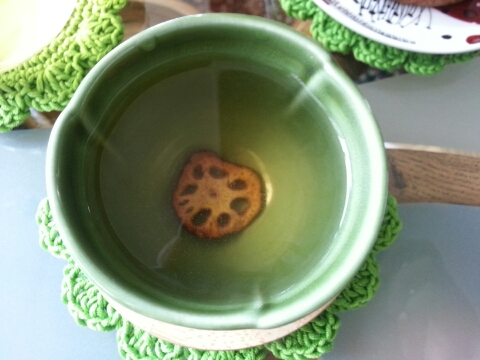
Lotus root tea
