= Goryeo coinage =

Currency used in Goryeo

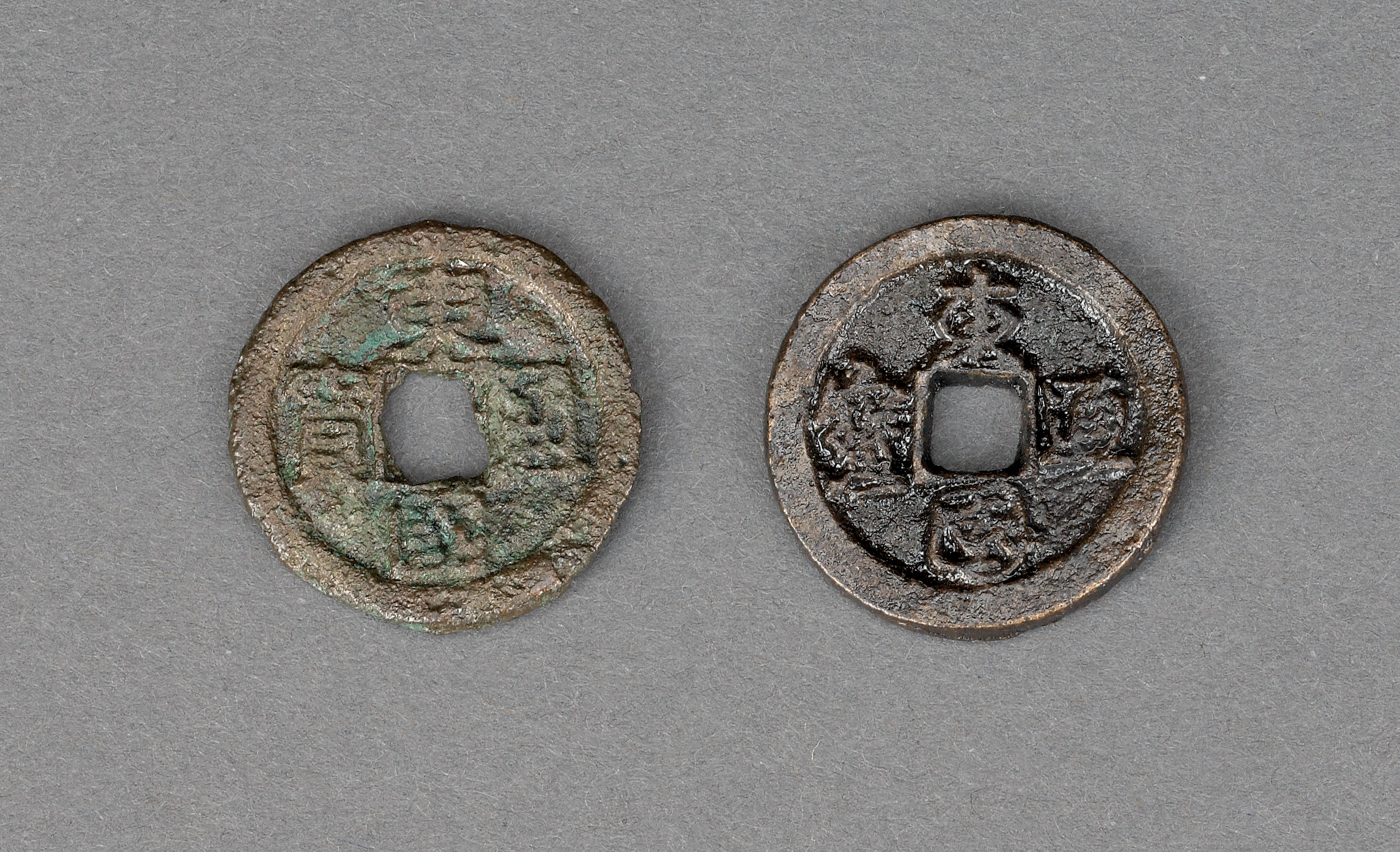
Two Dongguk Tongbo (동국통보; 東國通寶) cash coins

The kingdom of Goryeo used various currencies during its almost five centuries of rule on the Korean Peninsula. Both commodity and metallic money were used, often concurrently, in a "hybrid currency system": The metallic money consisted of coins, both Chinese and Korean, and silver currencies. Paper money was used during the late Goryeo period.

Goryeo was the first Korean state to mint its own coins. Among the coins issued by Goryeo, such as the Dongguk Tongbo, Samhan Tongbo, and Haedong Tongbo, about a hundred variants are known. Coins failed to gain widespread use, whereas silver currencies were used until the end of Goryeo. The ŭnbyŏng, a silver currency in the shape of the Korean Peninsula, was in circulation for around 300 years and, according to the Bank of Korea, occupies an important place in the history of Korean currency. Goryeo enjoyed monetary stability until the late 13th century, but experienced monetary instability with the introduction of paper currency from the Yuan dynasty.

== History ==
=== Early period ===
The main currencies used in Goryeo after its founding were Chinese money, such as Tang and Song dynasty coins, and commodity money, such as cloth (포화; 布貨). Goryeo did not have a unified legal currency, and each region, ruled by the quasi-independent hojok (호족; 豪族) regional lords, used a different currency.

Following the Khitan destruction of the kingdom of Balhae, which Goryeo had considered a country of kinship, Taejo of Goryeo proclaimed a ban on the circulation of all coins in 942. This was to sanction trade with the hated Khitans, who used metallic money, and protect Goryeo's metal reserves. In addition, Goryeo prepared itself for a conflict with the Khitan Empire. Taejo's prohibition in 942 indicates that, to some degree, coins had been circulating in Goryeo. Following the prohibition, rice and cloth were the medium of exchange. Likewise, cloth was the medium of exchange for everyday transactions in the Liao dynasty and Jin dynasty. During this period in Goryeo, agriculture achieved high productivity and living standards improved; rice and textile production enabled Goryeo to increase its military strength. The ban on coins lasted until 996, three years after Goryeo had resumed diplomatic relations with the Liao dynasty.

In 996, Seongjong of Goryeo minted iron coins to trade with the Khitans, who used iron coins. The coins may have been issued to promote centralization. As far as can be established, the iron coins were not inscribed. The government made many efforts to promote the use of coins instead of commodity money; in 997, Mokjong of Goryeo prohibited the monetary use of hemp cloth, which, at the time, was the most widely used currency for everyday transactions. However, because of opposition, including from the nobility, the government repealed the prohibition and shifted its policy in 1002: The distribution of the coins was stopped and the public was allowed to use any currency. Meanwhile, coins continued to be used at tea and wine shops (茶酒店) and restaurants.

The "Geonwon Jungbo", an iron coin inscribed with Geonwon Jungbo (건원중보; 乾元重寶) on one side and Dongguk (동국; 東國) on the other side, was excavated from a Goryeo tomb in the vicinity of Kaesong, the capital of Goryeo, in the early 1910s; it was unearthed along with bronze Geonwon Jungbo, Dongguk Tongbo, and Dongguk Jungbo coins. However, its relation to Goryeo's iron coins minted in 996 is controversial. Gary Ashkenazy of "Primal Trek" says that the Geonwon Jungbo is not mentioned in Korean historical sources and was not cataloged until 1938 in the Tōa senshi (東亞錢志) by Masahiro Okudaira, in which it is attributed to Goryeo.

In Korea, the Geonwon Jungbo is considered a Goryeo coin. The original coin, called the Qianyuan zhongbao in Chinese, dates to 759 during the Tang dynasty; the Geonwon Jungbo, in contrast, is inscribed with Dongguk on the reverse. Dongguk was one of Goryeo's many names, along with Samhan, Haedong, Dongbang, and Cheonggu. According to Jun Seong Ho of the Academy of Korean Studies: "Since cast coins cannot be altered, the coin cannot have been recast preserving the Tang inscription. Most probably, the coin was a heavy denomination cast by the [Goryeo] mint in the late tenth century." Furthermore, Goryeo and Tang coins have a different metal composition.

In China, the Geonwon Jungbo is viewed as a Goryeo coin or a Balhae coin. The "Goryeo coin" viewpoint is represented by the Tōa senshi, published in 1938. Wang Zuyuan, a proponent of the more recent "Balhae coin" viewpoint, says that Balhae always had close relations with and was strongly supported politically, economically, culturally, and militarily by the Tang dynasty; therefore, he concludes that Balhae, also known as "Haidong Shengguo" (海東盛國), minted the Geonwon Jungbo to show its loyalty to the Tang dynasty during the reign of Emperor Suzong (r. 756–762). However, Balhae coins have not been excavated. Alexander Alexeyvich Kim says, "One of the arguments the Chinese frequently use when they describe [Balhae] as 'provincial power of the Tang Empire' is the absence of [Balhae] coins." Russian archaeologists argue that Balhae may have used foreign currency, as many independent and developed states did.

Inscription	Hangul	McCune–Reischauer	Revised Romanization	Obverse image	Reverse image
乾元重寶 (Note: Geonwon Jungbo coins have mostly been found in Northeast China (e.g., Kaiyuan, Liaoning) and North Korea. Currently, only about ten have been found; more iron coins have been found than bronze coins.) 東國	건원중보 동국	Kŏnwŏn Chungbo; Tongguk	Geonwon Jungbo; Dongguk		

=== Middle period ===
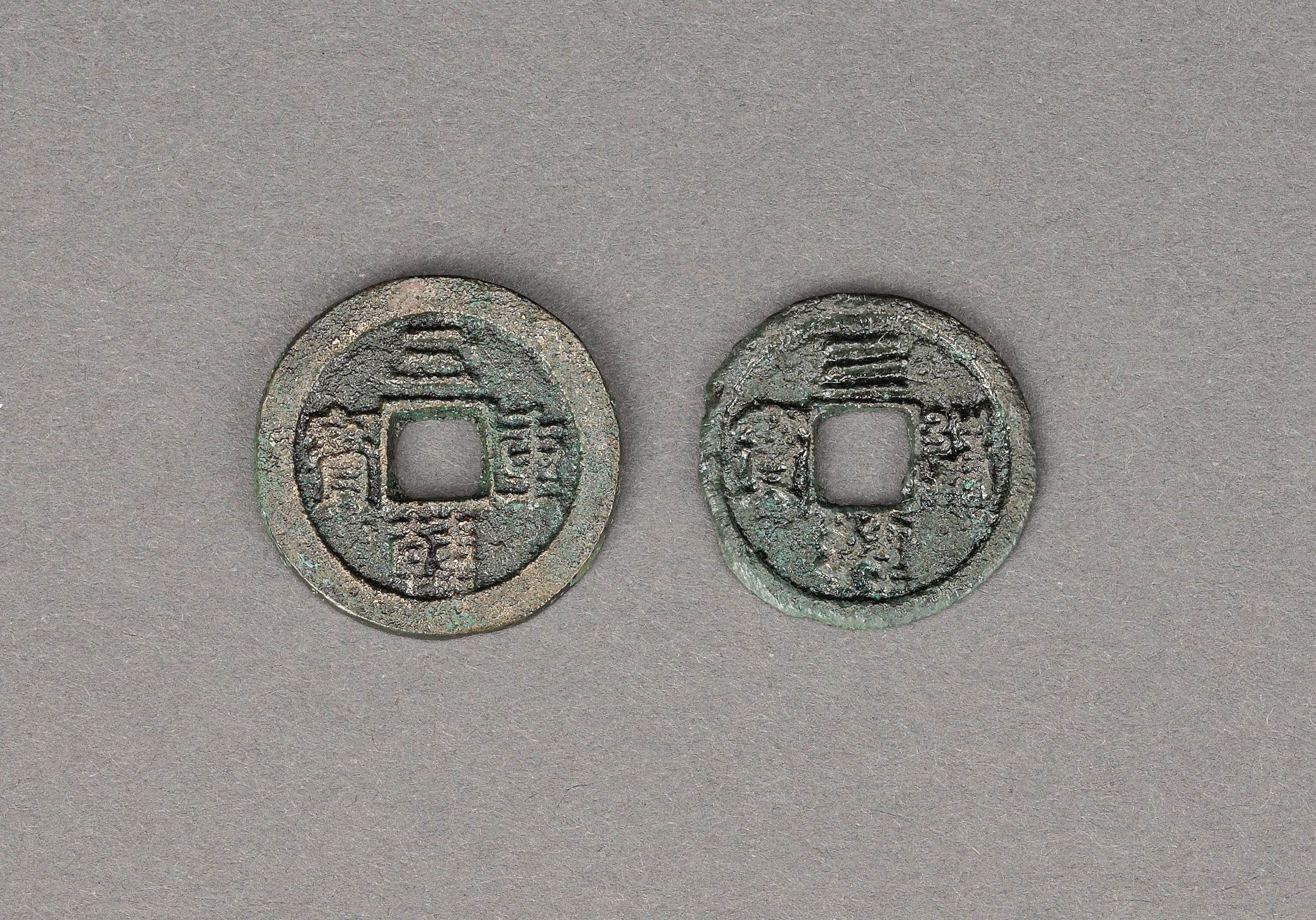
Samhan Jungbo and Samhan Tongbo

Goryeo issued new currencies during the reign of Sukjong of Goryeo (r. 1095–1105) based on proposals by the Buddhist monk Uichon and the military officer Yun Kwan. Uichon, who was a younger brother of Sukjong, argued for the implementation of a monetary economy, having experienced its convenience and efficiency in the Song dynasty. Moreover, his proposed reform was intended to centralize the commerce and economy, which were dominated by the nobility. Uichon established a mint bureau in 1097; coins, named after sobriquets of Goryeo, such as the Dongguk Tongbo, Samhan Tongbo, and Haedong Tongbo were subsequently minted and circulated. Beginning in 1101, a uniquely shaped silver currency called the ŭnbyŏng (은병; 銀甁), meaning "silver vase" in Korean, was cast and circulated.

Goryeo bronze coins resembled standard East Asian coins of the time, but differed in that they were inscribed with a national name instead of an era name. Sukjong actively promoted the use of coins. After a five-year delay because of opposition, 15,000 gwan (or 15 million pieces) of the Haedong Tongbo were minted in 1102. Goryeo had circulated coins in the past, but this was the first full-scale circulation. The Sikhwaji (식화지; 食貨志; lit. Treatise on Food and Money) in the History of Goryeo says: "There is nothing more important than coinage, which may benefit our country and enrich the people ... It is only now that we have issued decrees about the minting of metal coinage." To promote their use, the newly minted coins were distributed to government officials and soldiers, and new shops were installed in the capital; in 1104, the states and prefectures were ordered to open new wine shops and restaurants. Sukjong died in 1105. In the following year, his monetary policy was met with stiff resistance from officials in both the central and provincial governments. Despite the opposition, Yejong of Goryeo doubled down on Sukjong's monetary policy in 1112. However, coins ultimately failed to gain widespread use in Goryeo. Silver currency, on the other hand, was used continuously until the end of the dynasty. Xu Jing, a Song dynasty envoy who visited Goryeo in 1123, observed the use of the ŭnbyŏng, but not coins, as a currency.

The ŭnbyŏng "silver vase", popularly called the hwalgu (활구; 闊口) for its broad mouth, was imprinted with a government seal and first issued in 1101. It was made with one geun (근; 斤) of silver and designed to resemble the cartographic outline of the Korean Peninsula. The ŭnbyŏng was made because of the illegal manufacture of silver currency; all other silver currencies were prohibited by the government. As a stable, standardized currency, the ŭnbyŏng was used throughout the kingdom in both public finance and private trade; it was also used to pay taxes. The ŭnbyŏng was widely used as a currency by the nobility, whereas grain and cloth were used by the common people. Furthermore, the ŭnbyŏng was used mainly in large transactions. According to Jun Seong Ho: "For roughly 150 years from the early twelfth to the mid thirteenth century, silver was the main currency of [Goryeo]." Silver had been used as a currency before the ŭnbyŏng was made. Korean silver metallurgy was advanced, and Koreans exported silver, possibly in the form of ingots, to the Jurchens in the mid 10th century; Korean silver metallurgy was exported to the Jurchens in 1102. The ŭnbyŏng remained the only standardized silver currency in East Asia until the 16th century with the start of a silver mining boom in Japan, enabled by the introduction of cupellation from Korea in 1533.

Goryeo was a period of flourishing commerce, and Goryeo actively engaged in commercial activity with the Song dynasty during the 11th and 12th centuries. Song dynasty coins circulated in many parts of Asia. Goryeo, too, imported coins from the Song dynasty; more Song dynasty coins have been excavated than Goryeo coins in Korea. However, they were not necessarily used as a currency, but rather as a religious offering or grave good. In 1199, the Song government prohibited the export of coins to Goryeo and Japan.

=== Late period ===
Goryeo experienced a silver famine in the 13th century because of Mongol invasions. By the late 13th century, Goryeo was depleted of most of its silver by the Yuan dynasty. Beginning with the reign of Chungnyeol of Goryeo, the Yuan dynasty assumed control of Goryeo's monetary system and imposed its paper money; thus, Goryeo lost its monetary sovereignty. The destabilizing introduction of a new currency demonetized the economy.

The shortage of silver in Goryeo led to the debasement and counterfeiting of silver currency; the Goryeo government experienced problems with the ŭnbyŏng. Goryeo's "Bureau of Capital City Markets" (경시서; 京市署) adjusted the value of the ŭnbyŏng annually according to the harvest; in 1282, the value of one ŭnbyŏng was set at 15 to 16 seok (석; 石) of rice in the capital and 18 to 19 seok of rice in the provinces. The high value of the ŭnbyŏng led to the use of silver ingots called "swaeŭn" (쇄은; 碎銀; lit. broken silver) as a currency, which were valued based on weight. However, they were prohibited in 1287 because of the appearance of counterfeits mixed with copper. The ŭnbyŏng was also counterfeited, and had been since its inception; as the ŭnbyŏng became increasingly debased with copper, (Note: The ŭnbyŏng was originally composed of 80% silver and 20% copper.) its value decreased, and by 1328 the value of one ŭnbyŏng of the highest quality dropped to 10 bolts of cloth. In 1331, the Goryeo government abolished the ŭnbyŏng and replaced it with the miniaturized "so ŭnbyŏng" (소은병; 小銀甁; lit. small ŭnbyŏng), which was valued at 15 bolts of cloth.

Yuan paper money was introduced to Goryeo in 1270. In 1287, the Yuan dynasty decreed the use of the Zhiyuan baochao (지원보초; 至元寶鈔) and Zhongtong baochao (중통보초; 中統寶鈔) in Goryeo. Approximately 100,000 jeong (정; 錠) of baochao were circulated in Goryeo. The baochao was used extensively in trade with the Yuan dynasty. During its invasions of Japan, the Yuan dynasty paid for ships and soldiers in Goryeo with baochao paper money. According to Hun-Chang Lee of Korea University's Department of Economics, the inflow of paper currency and outflow of silver currency harmed the development of currency in Korea. Meanwhile, the Yuan dynasty exported large quantities of coin to Japan, which had not minted its own coins since the late 10th century. In the Sinan shipwreck of 1323, approximately 28 tons of coin were being transported by ship from China to Japan before sinking off the coast of the Korean Peninsula.

Yuan paper money was abolished in 1356 with Goryeo's independence from the Yuan dynasty. Instead, silver currency and hemp cloth stamped with a government seal were used as currencies. During the end of the Goryeo period, the monetary system was in a state of disarray, and various currencies were debased. Thus, in 1391, the Korean government introduced a new monetary system, consisting of both metallic currency (전화; 錢貨; Jeonhwa) and paper currency (저화; 楮貨; Jeohwa). The Goryeo dynasty transitioned into the Joseon dynasty in 1392. Jeohwa paper money continued to be used during the early Joseon period. Meanwhile, the ŭnbyŏng finally came to an end in 1408 after 300 years. A specimen of the miniaturized "so ŭnbyŏng", presumably dating to the late Goryeo period, has been discovered and currently resides in the Bank of Korea Money Museum, but a specimen of the larger original ŭnbyŏng has yet to be found.

== List of Goryeo cash coins by inscription ==
Inscription	Hangul	McCune–Reischauer	Revised Romanization	Script(s)	Date of casting	Diameter (in millimeters)	Weight (in grams)	Image
東國通寶	동국통보	Tongguk T'ongbo	Dongguk Tongbo	Seal script (篆書), clerical script (隸書), regular script (楷書), running script (行書)	998–1097 AD	23–25	2.4–3	
東國重寶	동국중보	Tongguk Chungbo	Dongguk Jungbo	Regular script (楷書)	998–1097 AD	24–25	2.8–4.2	
三韓通寶	삼한통보	Samhan T'ongbo	Samhan Tongbo	Seal script (篆書), clerical script (隸書), running script (行書)	1097–1105 AD	23–25	2.1–3.4	
叁韓通寶 (Note: This is an extremely rare variant of the Samhan Tongbo that is inscribed with 叁 in "official script" instead of 三; only one or two specimens have been found.)	삼한통보	Samhan T'ongbo	Samhan Tongbo	"Official script"	1097–1105 AD			
三韓重寶	삼한중보	Samhan Chungbo	Samhan Jungbo	Regular script (楷書)	1097–1105 AD	25	4	
海東通寶	해동통보	Haedong T'ongbo	Haedong Tongbo	Seal script (篆書), clerical script (隸書), regular script (楷書), running script (行書)	1097–1105 AD	25	2.9	
海東重寶	해동중보	Haedong Chungbo	Haedong Jungbo	Regular script (楷書)	1097–1105 AD	25	3.1–4	
海東元寶 (Note: This is an extremely rare variant of the Haedong Jungbo that is inscribed with 元 instead of 重; recent specimens have been found near Kaesong, North Korea.)	해동원보	Haedong Wŏnbo	Haedong Wonbo	Regular script (楷書)	1097–1105 AD			
