= Persimmon leaf tea =

East Asian herbal tea

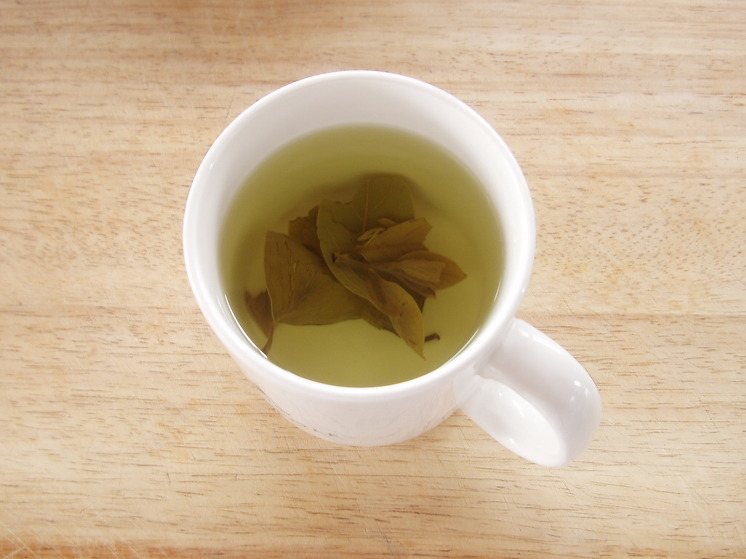
- Type: Herbal tea
- Other names: Gamnip-cha
- Origin: Korea
- Quick description: Tea made from Oriental persimmon leaves
- Temperature: 70 °C (158 °F)
- Time: 15 minutes

Korean name
- Hangul: 감잎차
- Hanja: 감잎茶
- RR: gamnipcha
- MR: kamnipch'a
- IPA: [kam.nip̚.tɕʰa]

Persimmon leaf tea is consumed in East Asian countries. It is known as shiyecha (Chinese: 柿叶茶), or kakinohacha (Japanese: 柿の葉茶), or gamnip-cha (Korean: 감잎차).

== Preparation ==
Young leaves are picked in May or June, washed, and dried for two to three days in shade. Dried leaves are usually cut into small pieces and steamed, and dried again. To make the tea, 2–3 grams (0.071–0.106 oz) of the dried leaves are brewed for 15 minutes in 100 millilitres (3.5 imp fl oz; 3.4 US fl oz) of water which was boiled and cooled to 70 °C (158 °F). A drop of maesil-ju (plum liquor) or yuja-cheong (yuja marmalade) can be added to the tea when served.

== Gallery ==
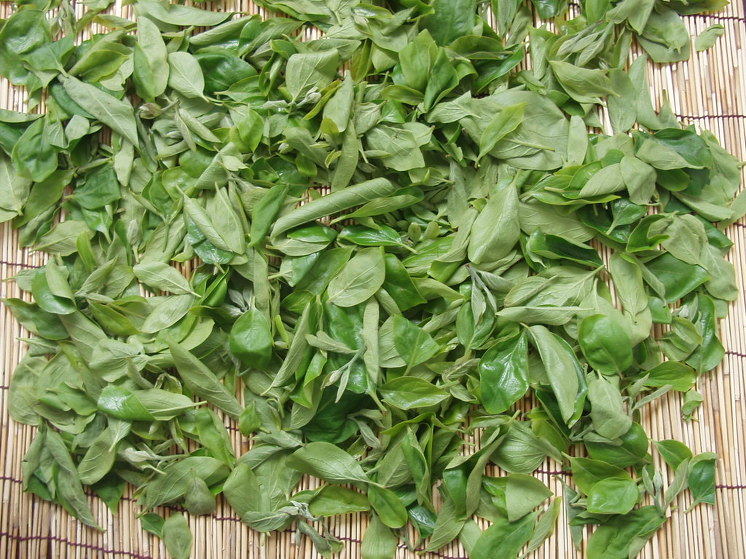
Drying persimmon leaves for persimmon leaf tea
