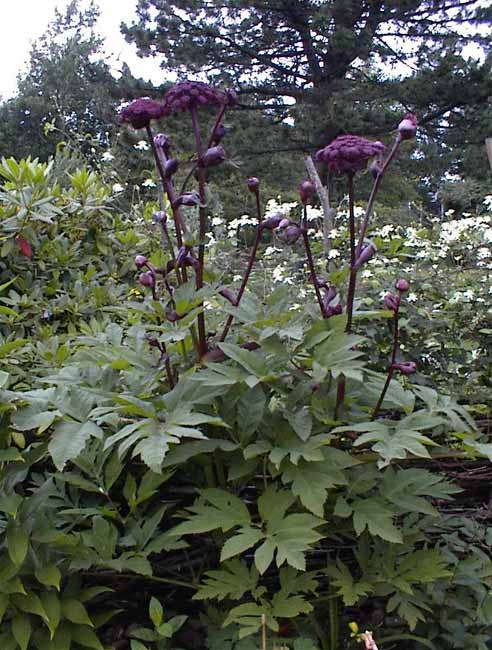

Scientific classification
- Kingdom: Plantae
- Clade: Tracheophytes
- Clade: Angiosperms
- Clade: Eudicots
- Clade: Asterids
- Order: Apiales
- Family: Apiaceae
- Genus: Angelica
- Species: A. gigas

Binomial name
- Angelica gigas Nakai

= Angelica gigas =

Species of plant

Angelica gigas, also called Korean angelica, giant angelica, purple parsnip, and dangquai, is a monocarpic biennial or short lived perennial plant from Korea and China. It inhabits forests, grasslands and banks of streams. The roots are used in traditional Chinese medicine.

== Description ==
Angelica gigas is a stout plant that is 1 to 2 meters high with deep thick roots and a purplish, ribbed stem. It has deeply dissected, very big, broad, pointy leaves.

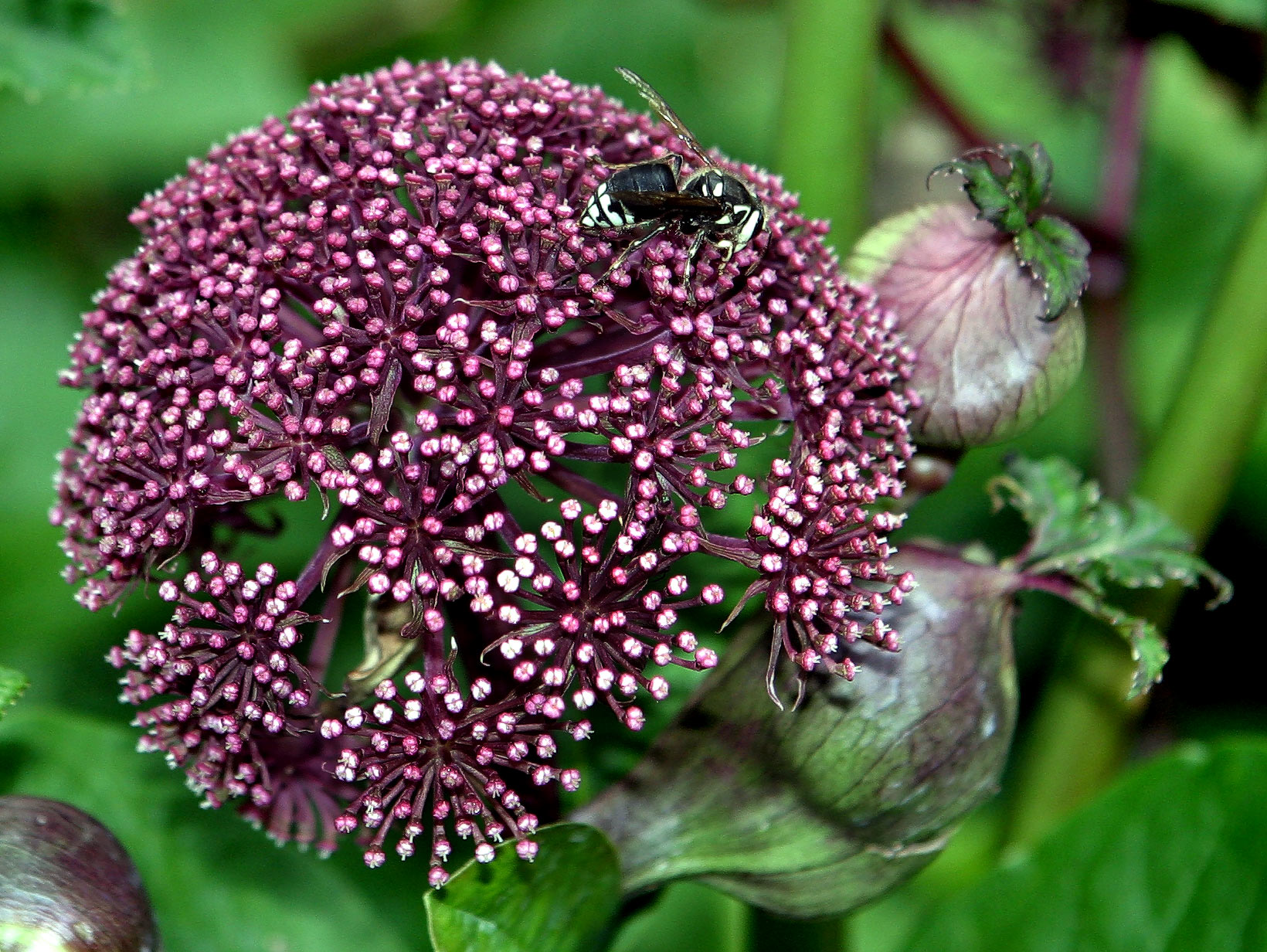
Flowers

The plant is a biennial that flowers in the months of July to August in dark purple umbels and selfseeds abundantly when the seeds have ripened.

== Cultivation ==
Giant angelica prefers moist soil and full sun or semishade. The plant is best propagated through seeds in the spring or through transplantation of selfseeded seedlings.

== Chemical components ==
Research in 2007 has isolated a chemical from the root of the plant, a coumarin derivative called decursin, that may have anti-androgenic properties in vitro. It also inhibits CYP2J2. In 2013, the main substance decursin, decursinol angelate (its isomer), JH714 (the ether form) and epoxide decursin (the epoxide form) were analyzed in vitro and in vivo. CYP isoforms were inhibited more than 50%. There was good blood brain barrier permeability in rats after oral administration of all but epoxide. Pharmacokinetic studies after oral and intravenous administration of 10 mg/kg showed that after 8 hours all test compounds stayed in the gastrointestinal tract at more than 1.5% of the dose and less than 0.5% was excreted in urine.

=== Medicinal uses ===
In Korea its root has been traditionally used as a folk medicine for the relief of menstrual pain and for anemia.
