= Ssanghwa-tang =

Traditional Korean medical tea

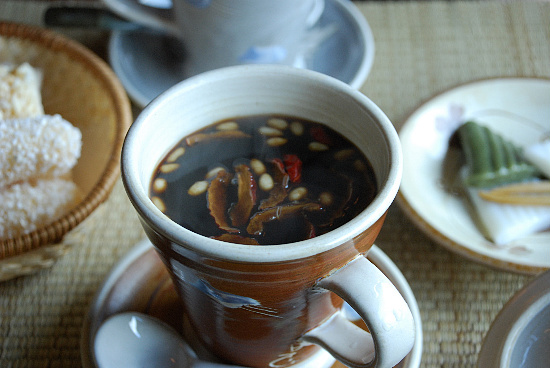
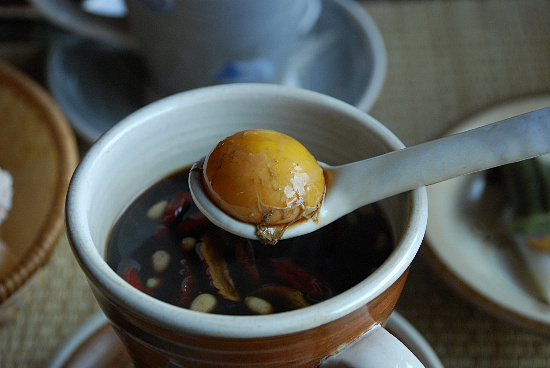
- Ssanghwa-tang with an egg yolk
- Type: Traditional Korean tea
- Origin: Korea
- Colour: Deep brown
- Flavour: Slightly bitter
- Ingredients: White woodland peony root, Rehmannia root, Mongolian milkvetch root, Korean angelica root, lovage root, Chinese cinnamon bark, Chinese liquorice

Korean name
- Hangul: 쌍화탕
- Hanja: 雙和湯
- RR: ssanghwatang
- MR: ssanghwat'ang
- IPA: [s͈aŋ.ɦwa.tʰaŋ]

Alternate name
- Hangul: 쌍화차
- Hanja: 雙和茶
- RR: ssanghwacha
- MR: ssanghwach'a
- IPA: [s͈aŋ.ɦwa.tɕʰa]

Ssanghwa-tang (Korean: 쌍화탕; Hanja: 雙和湯) or ssanghwa-cha (쌍화차; 雙和茶) is a traditional Korean tea with deep brown colour and a slightly bitter taste. Along with sipjeondaebotang, it is one of the most popular types of medical tea in Korea.

It is made by boiling down a number of medical herbs such as dried roots of white woodland peony (백작약; 白芍藥; baekjagyak), steamed and dried roots of rehmannia (숙지황; 熟地黃; sukjihwang), dried roots of Mongolian milkvetch (황기; 黃芪; hwanggi), dried roots of Korean angelica (당귀; 當歸; danggwi), dried roots of lovage (천궁; 川芎; cheongung), Chinese cinnamon barks (계피; 桂皮; gyepi), and Chinese liquorice (감초; 甘草; gamcho). However, many people today buy the tea pre-made.

== Efficacy and administration methods ==
Ssanghwangtang was an herbal bath which was enjoyed in the morning and evening during the Joseon period, but is now consumed as a beverage. Precautions for use should be consulted with a doctor, pharmacist, etc. before taking it, such as patients with hypertension, heart failure or kidney disorder, edema patients, and patients receiving medical treatment.

== See also ==
- Traditional Korean tea
- Traditional Korean medicine
