= Jujube tea =

Traditional Chinese tea made from jujubes

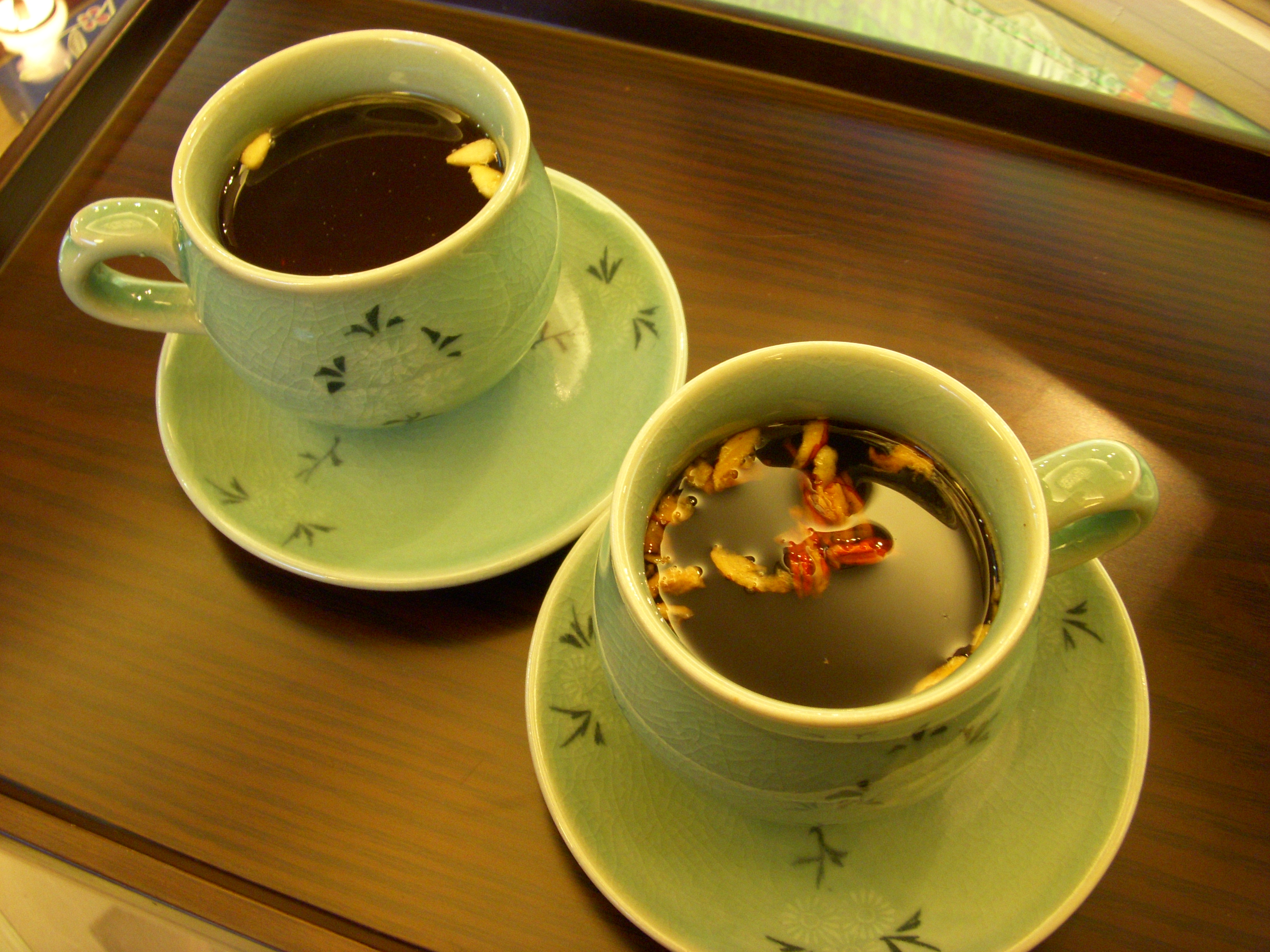
- Type: Herbal tea
- Origin: China
- Ingredients: Jujubes

Jujube tea is a Chinese tea made from jujubes. The tea is deep ruby-brown to rich dark maroon in color and is abundant in iron, potassium, and vitamins B and C. It is often garnished with pine nuts.

== Preparation ==
Jujube tea can be made by boiling dried jujubes or diluting the preserved jujubes into boiling water. Preserved jujubes can be made by simmering dried—preferably sun-dried—jujubes on low heat for about eight hours to a day, until the liquid becomes sweet and syrupy. A pre-made sweet jujube syrup is also commercially available in Chinese grocery stores.
