= Dabang =

Korean term for beverage shops

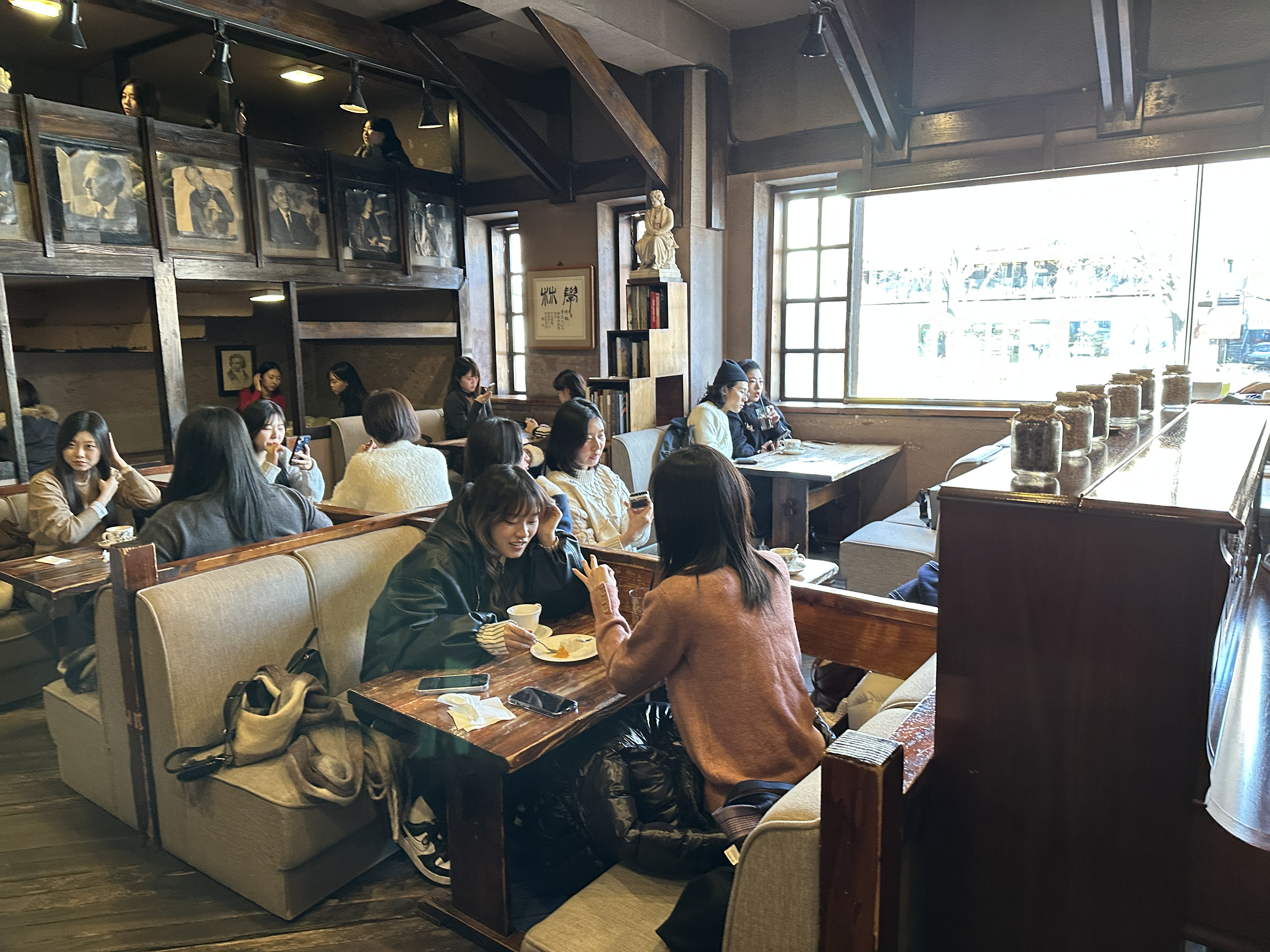
- Hakrim Dabang in Seoul

Korean name
- Hangul: 다방
- Hanja: 茶房
- RR: dabang
- MR: tabang

A dabang (Korean: 다방) is a Korean-language term for any establishment that primarily serves non-alcoholic drinks. The concept is comparable to that of cafes or teahouses.

Even modern non-Korean coffee chains like Starbucks can be referred to as dabangs. Some have dubbed Starbucks Byeoldabang (별다방; lit. 'Star Dabang').

== History ==
As modern Korea became more exposed to Western culture during the late Joseon dynasty and the Korean Empire, dabang-like establishments began to emerge. The dabang led to the origin of the Korean tea ceremony. It is said that Dado was established in other East Asian countries during the 8th and 9th centuries. In Korea, Dado culture was underdeveloped compared to its other East Asian counterparts such as China and Japan, as there was no Dado culture for the average Korean commoner. However, Dado culture was institutionalized at the national level. According to literature, there was a place where tea was drunk in the Unified Silla period called Daejeon Won (Tea 院), and the term "tea room" appeared in the Goryeo period. In the Goryeo period, the national government took charge of tea, liquor, fruit, etc. In the Joseon dynasty, there was a treaty encompassing these traditions that were connected to traditional ceremonies for the ancestors, and the tea ceremony was used during the reception for welcoming foreign envoys. The cafés affiliated with Daebul and Steward hotels established by foreigners in Incheon became pioneering dabang. However, dabang with modern functions and styles appeared after the March First Movement in 1919. The first hotel-style dabang of Seoul was housed inside Sontag Hotel, built in the neighborhood of Jeong-dong, Seoul, in 1902 by Ms. Sontag, a German-Russian. The hotel was built to serve foreign diplomats in Korea.

Around 1923, the modern tea room began to emerge. It was then that the first two Japanese-owned tea rooms, called "Futami" by Myeongdong and "Mt. Kumgang" by Chungmuro, were first established. In particular, Futami took the form of modern tea houses that resembled a coffee shop rather than a restaurant. In 1927 filmmaker Lee Kyung-Son opened a tea room called "Kakadu" at the entrance to Kwanhun-dong. Kakadu can be seen as the first dabang run by a Korean. In 1929, Jongno 2-ga opened the "Mexican Cafe" near the YMCA Hall of the Joseon dynasty, and its owners were actors Kim Yong-gyu and Simyeong.

The Russian style dabang called 'Troica' in Myeong-dong, Music dabang called 'Erisa', French style dabang called 'Mimosa', German style dabang called 'win', 'Fugaro' which is well known for weekly music concert, 'Dolce' used as a place for farewell in front of Seoul Station are the pioneers of the dabang culture. Since then, the coffee shop has been in a state of decline at the end of the Second World War and has been closed down since imports of sugar and coffee were blocked due to the Pacific War in 1941. As a result of the chaos of the 8/15 liberation and the 6/25 war, the former style of dabang gradually disappeared and transformed into a commercial café. Right after the Korean War in 1953, when cultural facilities became scarce, the dabang played a role of space for synthetic art, as well.

The tea ceremony of the 1950s was a social charitable object, serving as a hot-spot for the high-level unemployed. Since Kakadu, there were many cafés such as Hangaram, Asia, Kyungsung, and Grammar that were transformed from cultural dabang into commercial dabang like Myeong-dong.

Since the 1960s, the dabang has been transformed into a system in which, instead of the male masters of the intellectual class, women masters carry out face masam, register counters, and chefs. Since the 1970s, The dabang rooms have been decorated with colourful decorations. People visit dabang because of the convenience of commercial meeting rather than the flavour of the tea. Even employers who do not have offices have made use of dabang phones for business and do business with a secretary who works in the dabang. Especially, in the 1970s, as the instant coffee production of Dongseo Food, Koreans started to drink coffee at home, the coffee shop gradually began to become deluxe and specialised. The 1970s was also a time when music specialty coffee houses with youthful DJ s bloomed. In the 1980s, there were a lot of coffee shops with various kinds of tea, high prices, and luxurious interior decoration along with the autonomy of tea prices. The tea ceremony with chain stores started with 'Nandarang', and '00 Gallery', and when the night curfew system was abolished, the late-night tea room appeared in large cities. In the 1990s, dabang gradually lost its ground due to the spread of coffee machines, the refinement of beverages, and the increase of luxury dabang. Some coffee shops continue to use the name "dabang". Since the so-called 'Ticket dabang', which run prostitutes, flourished around the province, negative images of the tea ceremony has permeated.

== Modern day ==
After the liberation of Korea, the number of tea ceremonies increased every year since the 1975 restrictions were lifted. The number of dabang, however, started to decrease from a peak of about 45,000 in 1992, to about 33,000 before the 1997 financial crisis. After the IMF crisis, the number of dabang increased slightly, but it did not return to its former form nor retain its previous presence in the South Korean teahouse market. Since the onset of the 21st-century, the number of coffee shops throughout contemporary South Korea has sharply decreased, and cafés and specialty stores, such as domestic and overseas brand franchises, have taken their place.

== See also ==
- Ticket Dabang
