= Sujeonggwa =

Korean punch beverage

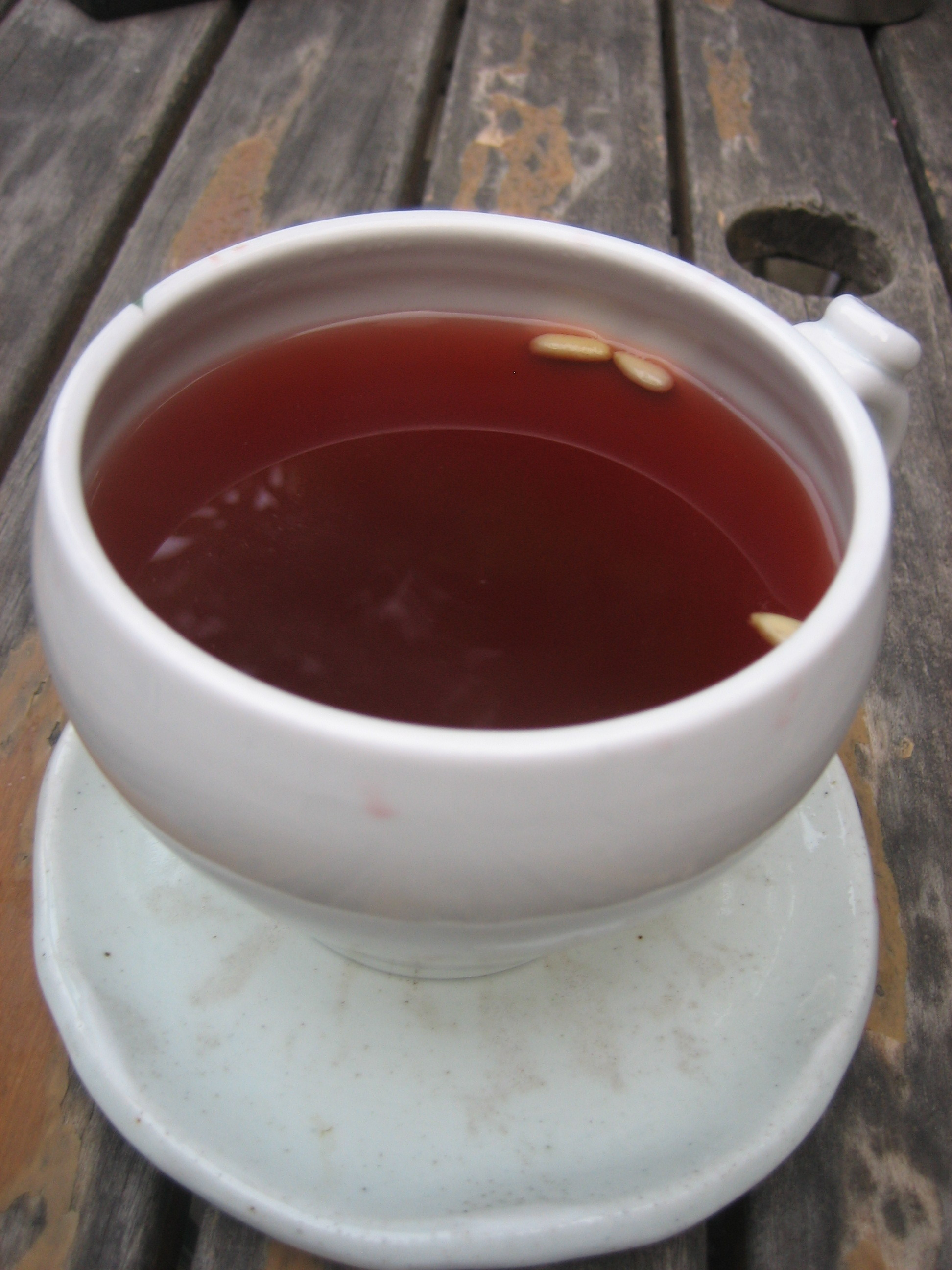

Korean name
- Hangul: 수정과
- Hanja: 水正果
- RR: sujeonggwa
- MR: sujŏnggwa

Sujeonggwa (Korean: 수정과) is a Korean traditional cinnamon punch. Dark reddish brown in color, it is made from mainly cinnamon, sugar, water and ginger. It is often served with gotgam (dried persimmon) and garnished with pine nuts. The punch is made by brewing first the cinnamon sticks and ginger at a slow boil. The solids are then removed for clarification and the remaining liquid is boiled again after adding either honey or brown sugar. The dried persimmons are cut into portions and are added to soak and soften after the brew has completely cooled. This is usually done several hours before serving, as extensive soaking of the fruit may thicken the clear liquid to a murky appearance.

Sujeonggwa is served cold and commonly as a dessert, much like sikhye, due to its sweet taste. It is also widely available in canned form.

== History ==
The earliest mention of sujeonggwa dates back to 1849 in the book Dongguksesigi (동국세시기; 東國歲時記), a book of seasonal customs written by scholar Hong Seok-mo (홍석모). The sujeonggwa recipe mentioned in the book is a dried persimmon brew with added ginger and pine nuts.

In the book Haedongjukji (해동죽지; 海東竹枝) written in 1921, sujeonggwa is known to have been prepared in the Goryeo era by palace women on New Year's Day. Then they were boiling ginger and adding persimmons to the brew. Its former name was baekjeho (백제호), literally meaning "white milky beverage", and was named after the white appearance of sugar-coated persimmons. Nowadays sujeonggwa is a popular traditional beverage drank year-round.

The recipe of sujeonggwa has changed over time. The recipe of sujeonggwa is first mentioned in Sujaguigwe (수작의궤,受爵儀軌). Ginger was not used in Gunhakoedeung (군학회등; 群學會騰), and cinnamon was first used in The Recipes of Joseon (조선요리법; 朝鮮料理法). Pear was used in The New Making of Joseon Food (조선무쌍신식요리제법; 朝鮮無雙新式料理製法) and liquorice, mandarin peels, whole black pepper was also sometimes added. Honey was originally used for sweetening but it was replaced with sugar after The Recipes of Joseon.

== Variants ==
=== Geonsisujeonggwa (cinnamon punch with dried persimmon) ===
Geonsisujeonggwa is an original kind of sujeonggwa. It uses ginger and cinnamon as its main ingredients, and often honey or sugar are added to taste. It is garnished with pine nut or gotgam (dried persimmon).

=== Galyeonsujeonggwa (lotus cinnamon punch) ===
Galyeonsujeonggwa uses schisandra as its main ingredients, and adds honey or sugar to keep it sweet and the inside flower petal of lotus in the water. The leaves must be boiled and coated by starch powder.

=== Jabgwasujeonggwa (cinnamon punch with miscellaneous fruits) ===
Jabgwasujeonggwa adds chopped citron or pear in the sweet water. It is very similar to Hwachae.

=== Cinnamon punch with pear ===
This variant uses pear instead of dried persimmon. In the past, people ate boiled pears (another name of Cinnamon Punch with Pear, in Korean, is Insug) because most high quality pears are so stiff to eat. In order to make it easier to eat pears, they made them into a kind of cinnamon punch.

=== Cinnamon punch with pumpkin ===
This variant adds pumpkin to the original. It is usually enjoyed in Gangwon Province.

== See also ==
- Gamju
- Jallab (Arab cuisine)
- Korean cuisine
- List of Korean beverages
