= Coclaurine =

Names
- Preferred IUPAC name (1S)-1-[(4-Hydroxyphenyl)methyl]-6-methoxy-1,2,3,4-tetrahydroisoquinolin-7-ol

Identifiers
CAS Number	486-39-5
3D model (JSmol)	Interactive image
ChemSpider	141028
KEGG	C06161
PubChem CID	160487
UNII	CW1576313Y
CompTox Dashboard (EPA)	DTXSID60197561
- InChI: InChI=1S/C17H19NO3/c1-21-17-9-12-6-7-18-15(14(12)10-16(17)20)8-11-2-4-13(19)5-3-11/h2-5,9-10,15,18-20H,6-8H2,1H3/t15-/m0/s1 Key: LVVKXRQZSRUVPY-HNNXBMFYSA-N; InChI=1/C17H19NO3/c1-21-17-9-12-6-7-18-15(14(12)10-16(17)20)8-11-2-4-13(19)5-3-11/h2-5,9-10,15,18-20H,6-8H2,1H3/t15-/m0/s1 Key: LVVKXRQZSRUVPY-HNNXBMFYBJ
- SMILES: COC1=C(C=C2[C@@H](NCCC2=C1)CC3=CC=C(C=C3)O)O

Properties
Chemical formula	C_{17}H_{19}NO_{3}
Molar mass	285.343 g·mol^{−1}
- Except where otherwise noted, data are given for materials in their standard state (at 25 °C [77 °F], 100 kPa). Infobox references

Coclaurine is a nicotinic acetylcholine receptor antagonist which has been isolated from a variety of plant sources including Nelumbo nucifera, Sarcopetalum harveyanum, Ocotea duckei, and others. It belongs to the class of tetrahydroisoquinoline alkaloids. Dimerization of coclaurine leads to the biscoclaurine alkaloids such as cepharanthine.

== Biosynthesis ==
Biosynthesis of (S)-norcoclaurine

(S)-coclaurine is produced from (S)-norcoclaurine as part of the general alkaloid biosynthesis pathway to isoquinolines. The precursor is a tetrahydroisoquinoline, arising from the condensation of two tyrosine derivatives, dopamine and 4-hydroxyphenylacetaldehyde.

In this methylation reaction, the enzyme (RS)-norcoclaurine 6-O-methyltransferase uses the cofactor, S-adenosyl methionine (SAM) which transfers a methyl group, giving S-adenosyl-L-homocysteine (SAH) as a by-product.

(S)-norcoclaurine
+ SAM
coclaurine
+ SAH

== Metabolism ==
The next stage of the biosynthesis of alkaloids derived from (S)-coclaurine involves a second methylation reaction to give (S)-N-methylcoclaurine, which is formed by the action of the enzyme (S)-coclaurine-N-methyltransferase:

coclaurine
+ SAM
(S)-N-methylcoclaurine
+ SAH

Subsequent reactions lead to (S)-reticuline, from which many other alkaloids are derived.

Coclaurine can also be incorporated into dimeric alkaloids via an oxidation reaction. The enzyme berbamunine synthase combines coclaurine and a related N-methyl compound, (R)-N-methylcoclaurine, to give 2'-norberbamunine. Further elaboration leads to examples such as cepharanthine.

coclaurine
+
(R)-N-methylcoclaurine
O_{2}
2 H_{2}O
2'-norberbamunine
