= (RS)-norcoclaurine 6-O-methyltransferase =

Class of enzymes

Identifiers
- EC no.: 2.1.1.128
- CAS no.: 167398-06-3

Databases
- IntEnz: IntEnz view
- BRENDA: BRENDA entry
- ExPASy: NiceZyme view
- KEGG: KEGG entry
- MetaCyc: metabolic pathway
- PRIAM: profile
- PDB structures: RCSB PDB PDBe PDBsum
- Gene Ontology: AmiGO / QuickGO
Search
- PMC: articles
- PubMed: articles
- NCBI: proteins

In enzymology, (RS)-norcoclaurine 6-O-methyltransferase (EC 2.1.1.128) is an enzyme that catalyzes the chemical reaction:

(S)-norcoclaurine
+ SAM
coclaurine
+ SAH

In this methylation reaction, the enzyme uses the cofactor, S-adenosyl methionine (SAM) which transfers a methyl group, giving S-adenosyl-L-homocysteine (SAH) as a by-product. As the name of the enzyme implies, it also converts (R)-norclaurine to (R)-coclaurine.

== Family ==
This enzyme belongs to the family of transferases, specifically those transferring one-carbon group methyltransferases. The systematic name of this enzyme class is S-adenosyl-L-methionine:(RS)-norcoclaurine 6-O-methyltransferase. This enzyme participates in alkaloid biosynthesis.
