= (S)-coclaurine-N-methyltransferase =

Class of enzymes

Identifiers
- EC no.: 2.1.1.140

Databases
- IntEnz: IntEnz view
- BRENDA: BRENDA entry
- ExPASy: NiceZyme view
- KEGG: KEGG entry
- MetaCyc: metabolic pathway
- PRIAM: profile
- PDB structures: RCSB PDB PDBe PDBsum
- Gene Ontology: AmiGO / QuickGO
Search
- PMC: articles
- PubMed: articles
- NCBI: proteins

In enzymology, (S)-coclaurine-N-methyltransferase (EC 2.1.1.140) is an enzyme that catalyzes the chemical reaction

coclaurine
+ SAM
(S)-N-methylcoclaurine
+ SAH

S-adenosyl methionine (SAM) provides the methyl group for alkylation of (S)-coclaurine, which is converted to (S)-N-methylcoclaurine, with S-adenosylhomocysteine (SAH) as a by-product.

This enzyme belongs to the family of transferases, specifically those transferring one-carbon group methyltransferases. The systematic name of this enzyme class is S-adenosyl-L-methionine:(S)-coclaurine-N-methyltransferase. This enzyme participates in alkaloid biosynthesis.
