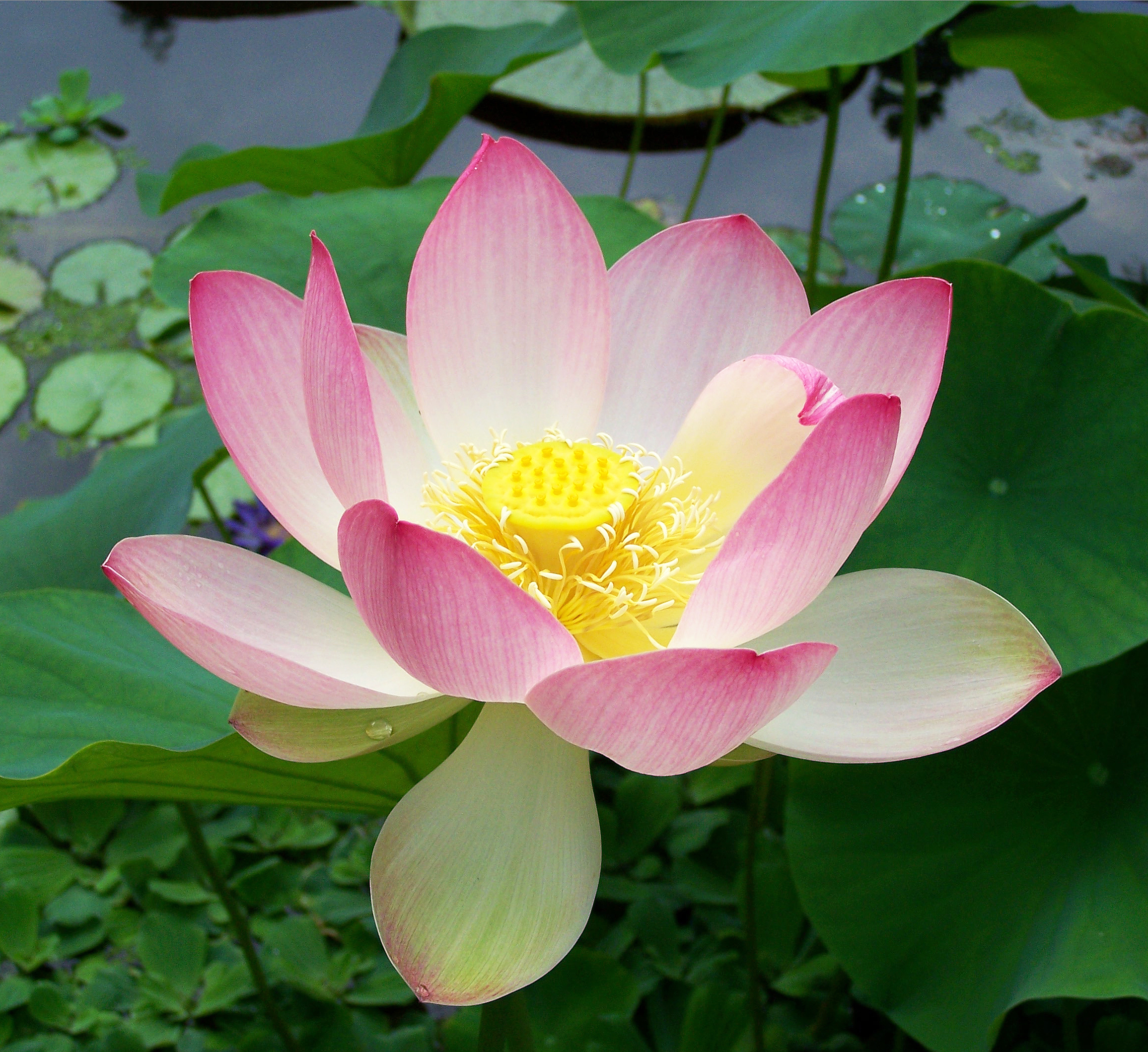
- Lotus flower

Scientific classification
- Kingdom: Plantae
- Clade: Tracheophytes
- Clade: Angiosperms
- Clade: Eudicots
- Order: Proteales
- Family: Nelumbonaceae
- Genus: Nelumbo
- Species: N. nucifera

Binomial name
- Nelumbo nucifera Gaertn.

Synonyms
- Nelumbium speciosum Willd.; Nelumbo komarovii Grossh.; Nymphaea nelumbo

= Nelumbo nucifera =

Species of aquatic flowering plant

Nelumbo nucifera, also known as Padma (Sanskrit: पद्म, romanized: Padma, lit. 'Lotus') or Kamala (Sanskrit: कमल, lit. 'Lotus'), sacred lotus, pink lotus, Indian lotus, or simply lotus, is one of two extant species of aquatic plant in the family Nelumbonaceae. It is sometimes colloquially called water lily, though this more often refers to members of the family Nymphaeaceae. The lotus belongs in the order Proteales.

== Description ==
Lotus plants are adapted to grow in the flood plains of slow-moving rivers and delta areas. Stands of lotus drop hundreds of thousands of seeds every year to the bottom of the pond.

Some sprout immediately, though most are eaten by wildlife. The remaining seeds can remain dormant for an extensive period of time as the pond silt fills in and dries out. During flood conditions, sediments containing these seeds are broken open, and the dormant seeds rehydrate and begin a new lotus colony.

Lotus plants are cultivated in nutrient-rich, loamy, and often flooded soils, requiring warm temperatures and specific planting depths, with propagation via rhizomes, seeds, or tissue culture. It is harvested by hand or machine for stolons, flowers, seeds, and rhizomes over several months depending on climate and variety.

It is the national flower of India and unofficially of Vietnam. It has large leaves and flowers that can regulate their temperature, produces long-living seeds, and contains bioactive alkaloids. Under favourable circumstances, the seeds of this aquatic perennial may remain viable for many years, with the oldest recorded lotus germination being from seeds 1,300 years old recovered from a dry lakebed in northeastern China. Therefore, the Chinese regard the plant as a symbol of longevity.

It has a very wide native distribution, ranging from East Asia (north to the Amur region) through northern Indochina and central and northern India (at altitudes up to 1,400 m (4,600 ft) in the southern Himalayas),; the Russian populations have sometimes been referred to as Nelumbo komarovii, with isolated locations at the Caspian Sea. Today, the species also occurs in southern India, Sri Lanka, virtually all of Southeast Asia, New Guinea, and northern and eastern Australia, but this is probably the result of human translocations. It has a very long history (c. 3,000 years) of being cultivated for its edible seeds and is commonly cultivated in water gardens. It is a highly symbolic and versatile plant used in religious offerings (especially in Hinduism and Buddhism) and diverse culinary traditions across Asia, with its flowers, seeds, and rhizomes valued for spiritual, cultural, and nutritional purposes. It holds deep cultural, spiritual, and religious significance across Hinduism, Buddhism, Jainism, Ismailism, and Chinese culture, symbolizing purity, enlightenment, spiritual awakening, and divine beauty, and is widely depicted in art, architecture, and literature.

The leaves of Nelumbo nucifera contain the flavonol miquelianin and alkaloids such as coclaurine and norcoclaurine, while the plant as a whole contains bioactive compounds including nuciferine and neferine. These constituents have been studied for their potential pharmacological effects, and the plant is used in traditional medicine and marketed as a functional food in various cultures.

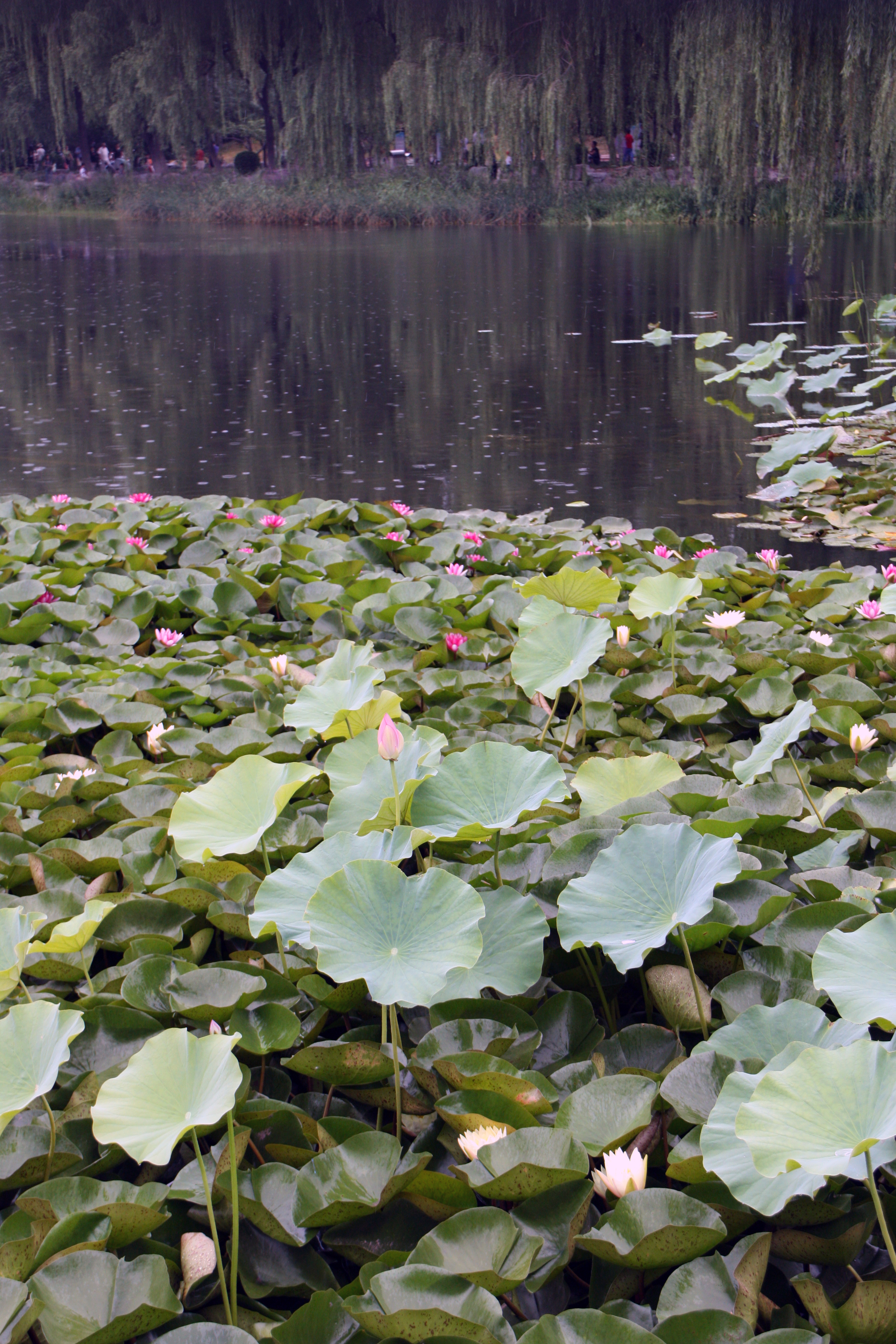
Lotus pond

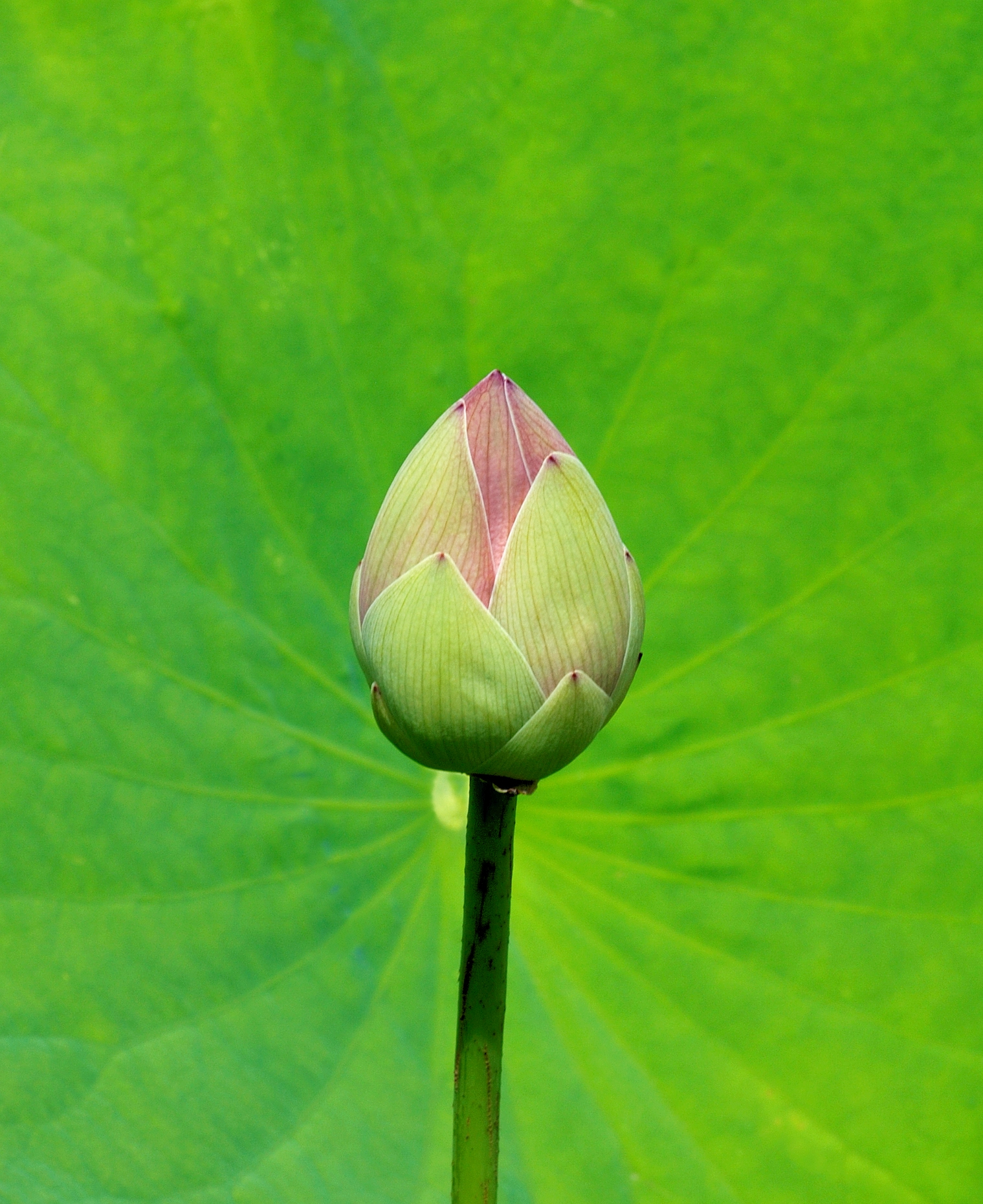
Developing bud

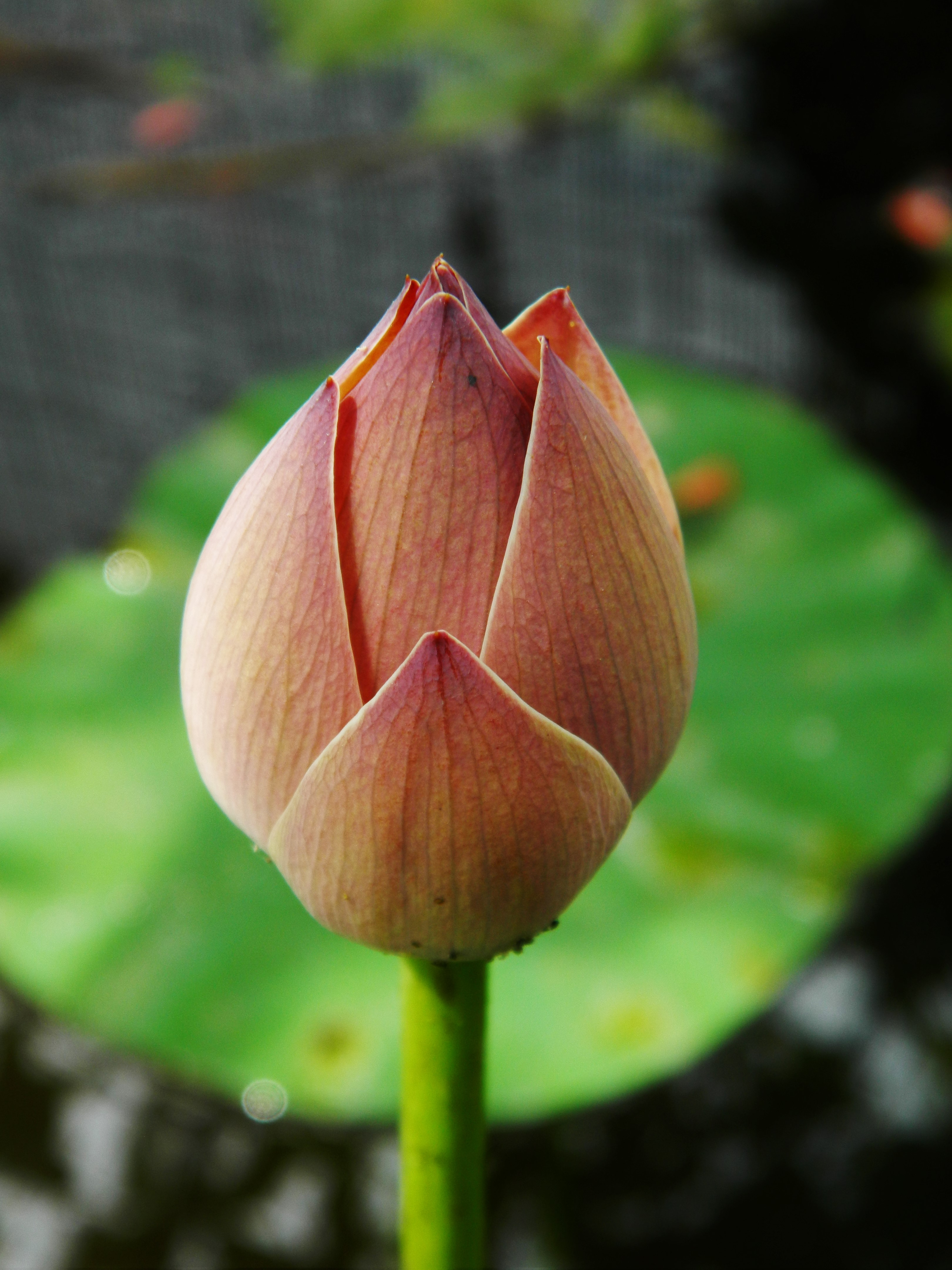
Bud

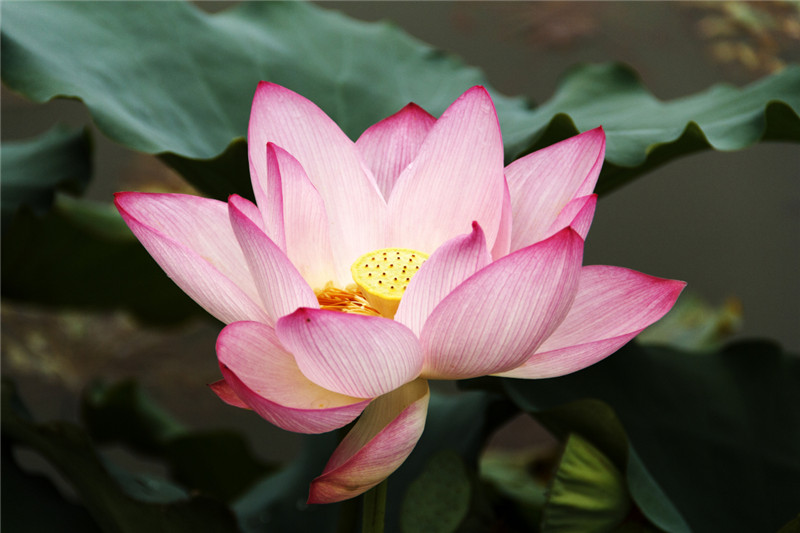
Flower

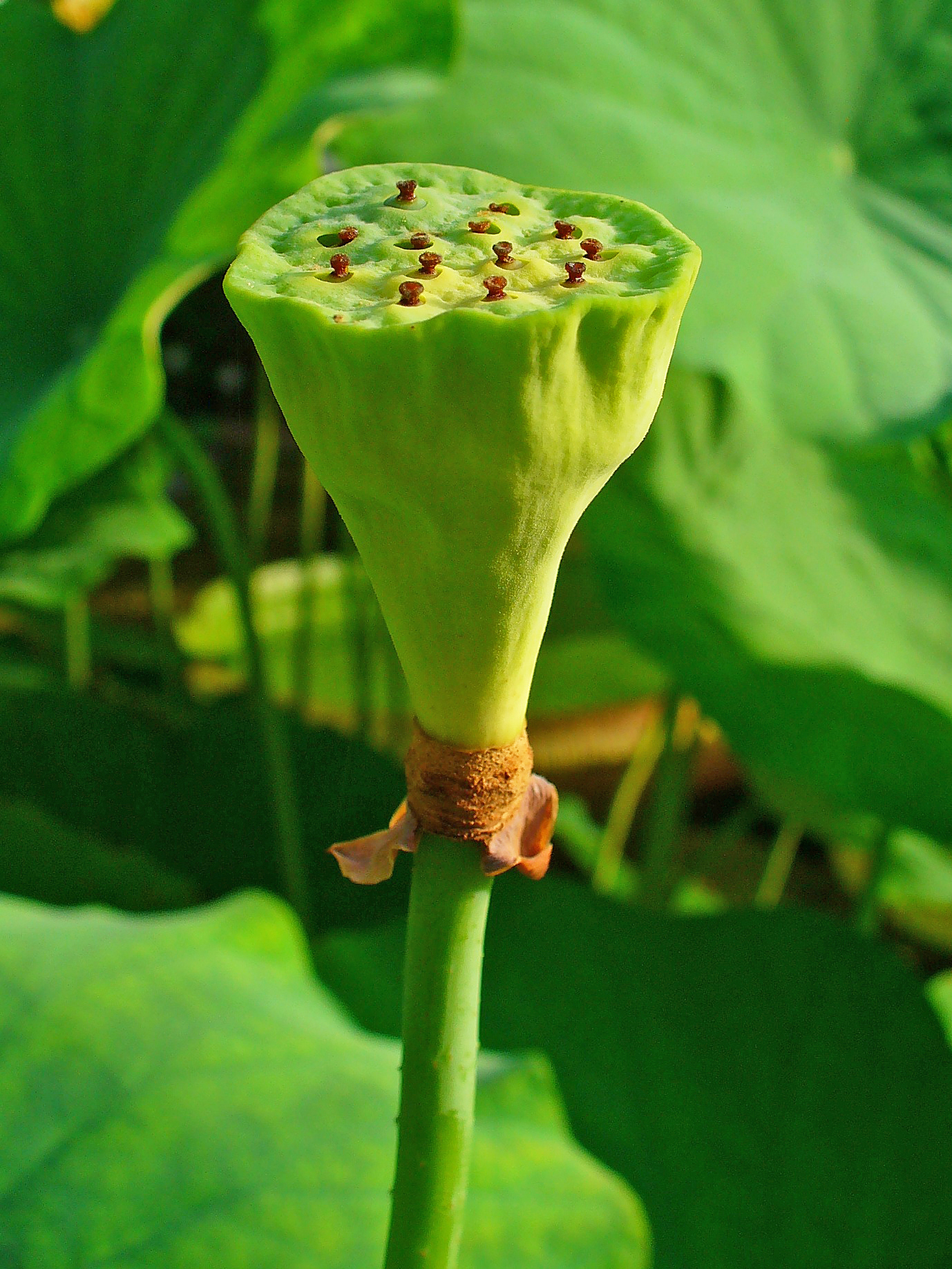
Developing fruit

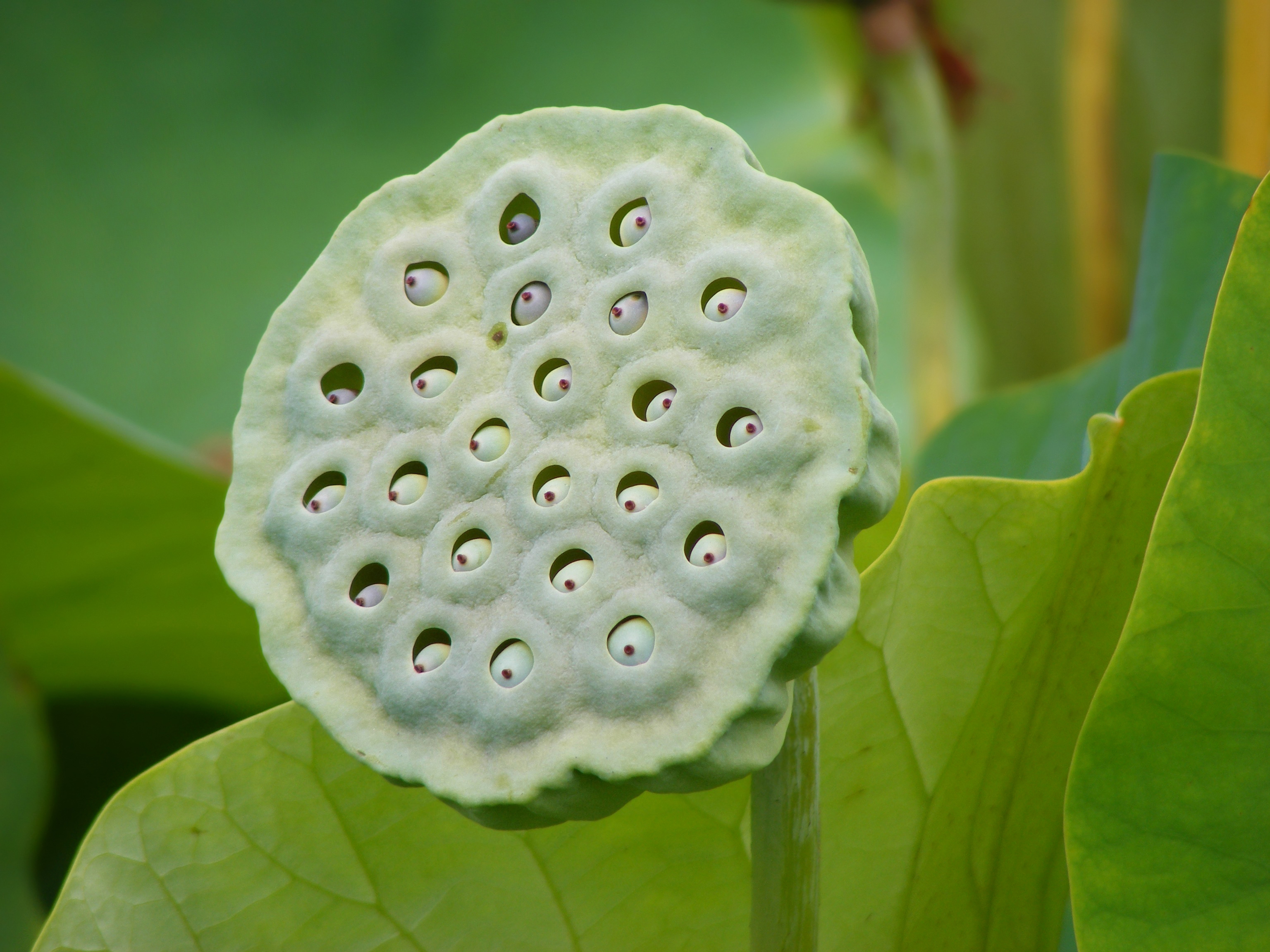
Fruit

== Etymology ==
The scientific name Nelumbo nucifera comes from a Sinhalese name for the plant, nelambu or nelum (නෙළඹු or නෙළුම්), and the Latin word 'nucifera', meaning "nut-bearing". Therefore, the full name translates to "nut-bearing nelumbo", referring to the plant's edible, nut-like seeds.

== Classification ==
The lotus is often confused with the true water lilies of the genus Nymphaea, in particular N. caerulea, the "blue lotus". In fact, several older systems, such as the Bentham & Hooker system (which is widely used in the Indian subcontinent), refer to the lotus by its old synonym, Nymphaea nelumbo.

While all modern plant taxonomy systems agree that this species belongs in the genus Nelumbo, the systems disagree as to which family Nelumbo should be placed in or whether the genus should belong in its own unique family and order. According to the APG IV system, N. nucifera, N. lutea, and their extinct relatives belong in Proteales with the protea flowers due to genetic comparisons. Older systems, such as the Cronquist system, place N. nucifera and its relatives in the order Nymphaeles based on anatomical similarities. According to the APG IV classification, the closest relatives of Nelumbo include the sycamores (Platanaceae).

== Botany ==
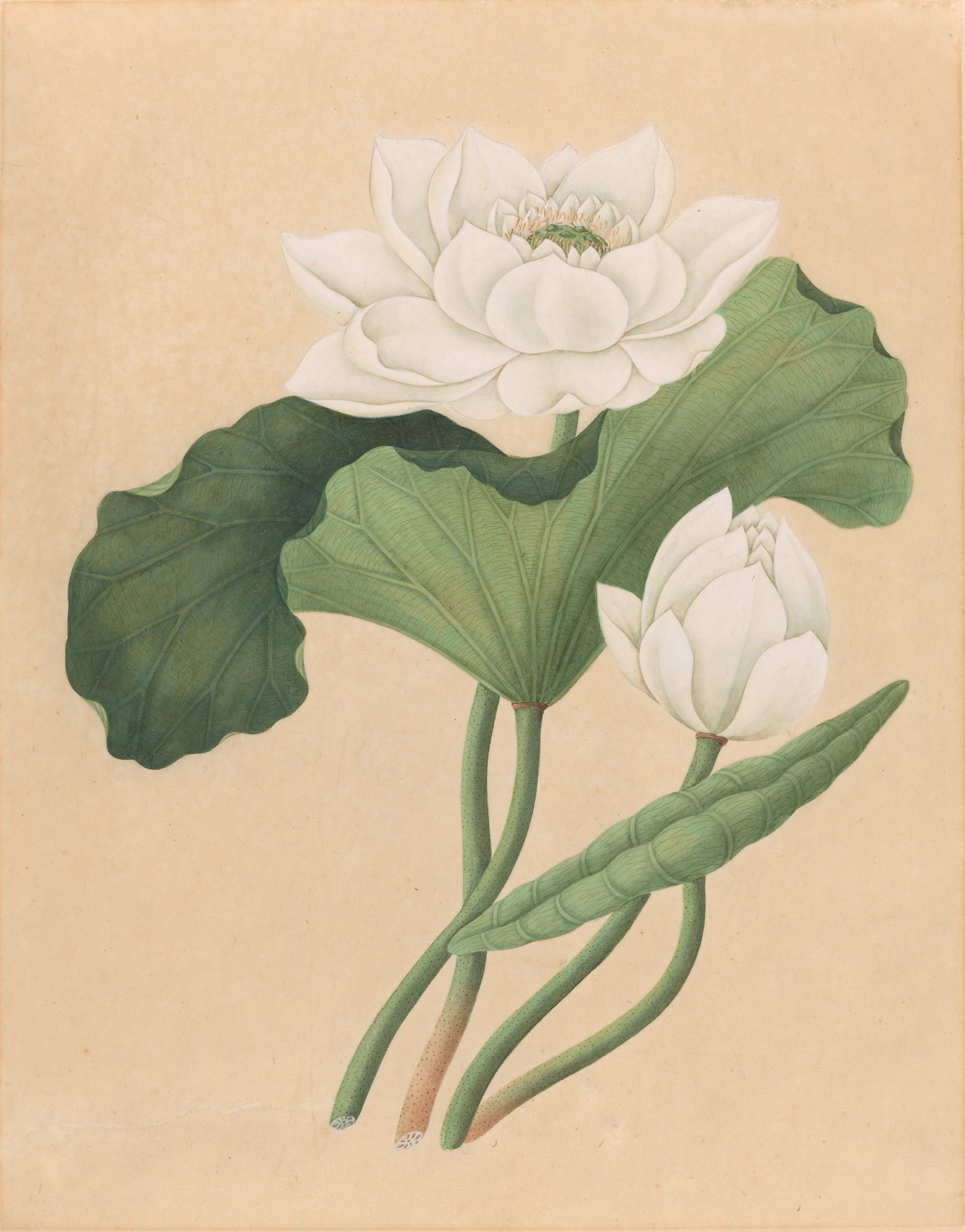
British 19th century, East Indian Lotus (Nelumbo nucifera), late 19th century, National Gallery of Art, NGA 52325

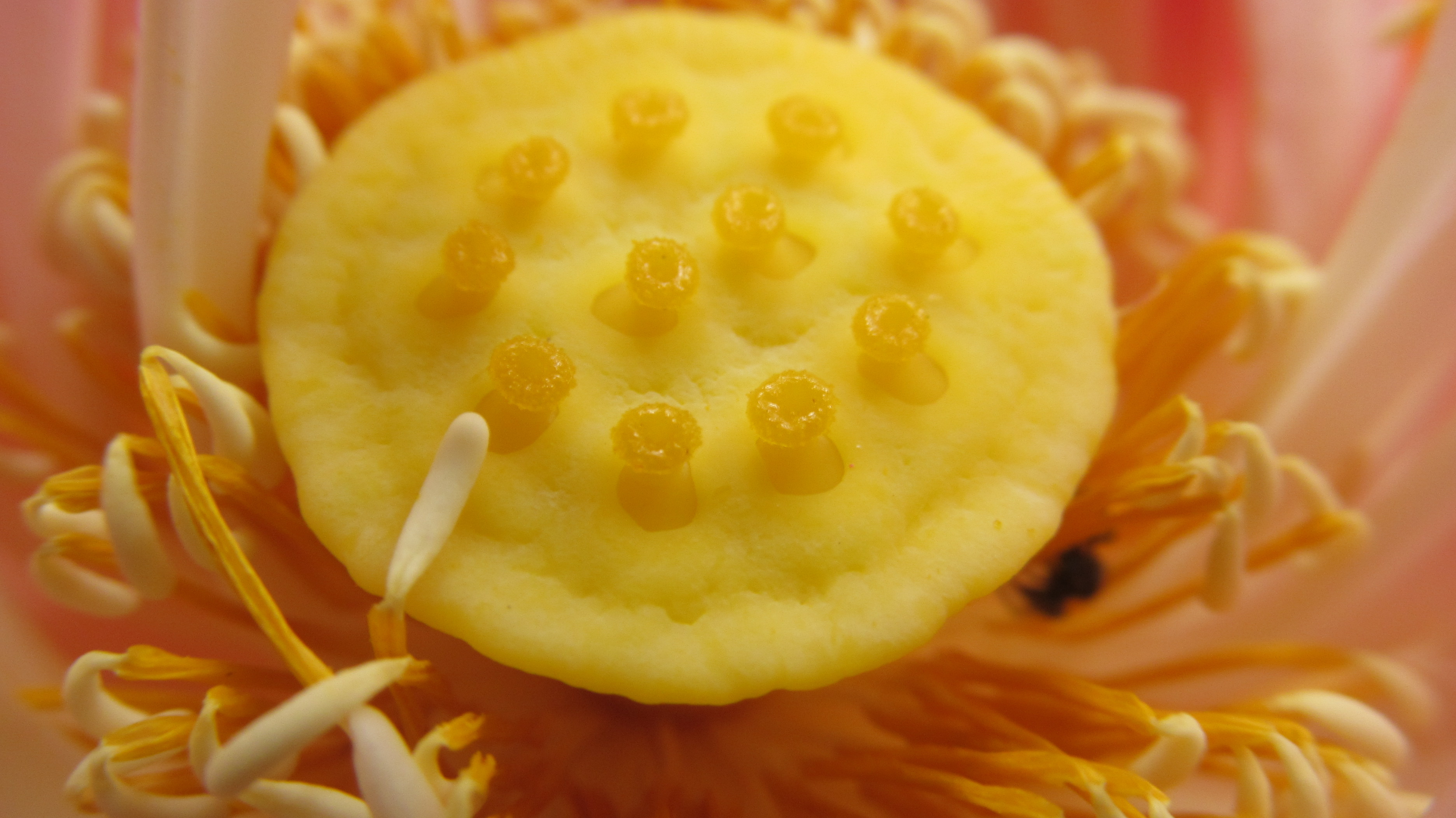
Carpellary receptacle of lotus

The lotus roots grow in pond or river bottom soil, while the leaves float on the water's surface or are held well above it. The leaf stalks (petioles) can be up to 200 cm (6 ft 7 in) long, allowing the plant to grow in water to that depth. The peltate leaf blade or lamina can have a diameter of 80–100 cm (2 ft 7 in – 3 ft 3 in). The leaves are spaced up to 2 m (6 ft 7 in) apart along the rhizome, which can grow as much as 20 m (66 ft) in one year. The internodes are not cylindrical but swollen in the middle.

=== Flower ===
The flowers are usually found on thick stems rising several centimetres above the leaves. They are showy and grow up to 35 cm (14 in) in diameter.

Some cultivated varieties have extraordinary numbers of petals. For example, the Chinese variety qian ban lian ("thousand petals lotus") can have between 3,000 and 4,000 petals in a single blossom and the Japanese variety ohmi myoren ("strange lotus") can have between 2,000 and 5,000 petals, the greatest number recorded for any species of plant.

Lotus flowers regulate their temperature to within a narrow range, maintaining temperatures of 30–35 °C (86–95 °F), even with air temperatures as low as 10 °C (50 °F). Researchers think that this may be to attract cold-blooded insect pollinators to the flowers. Nelumbo nucifera is not closely related to other plants known to be thermogenic.

=== Seed ===
A fertilized lotus flower bears fruit that contains a cluster of 10 to 30 seeds. Each seed is ovoid 1–2.5 cm wide by 1–1.5 cm long with a brownish coat. Lotus seeds can remain viable after long periods of dormancy. In 1994, a seed from a sacred lotus, dated at roughly 1,300 years old ± 270 years, was successfully germinated.

The genome of the sacred lotus was sequenced in May 2013. A dedicated genome database lists additional genome assemblies sequenced since then.

== Cultivation ==
The sacred lotus grows in water about 2.5 m (8 ft) to 30 cm (12 in) deep. In colder climates, a deeper water level protects the tubers more effectively, and improves growth and flowering. The sacred lotus germinates at temperatures above 13 °C (55 °F). Most varieties are not naturally cold-hardy, but may readily adapt to living outdoors year-round in USDA hardiness zones 6 through 11 (with some growers having success in zones as low as 4 or 5); the higher the zone's number, the greater the adaptability of the plants. In the growing season (from April to September in the northern hemisphere), the average daytime temperature needed is 23 to 27 °C (73 to 81 °F). In regions with low light levels in winter, the sacred lotus has a period of dormancy. The tubers are not cold-resistant if removed from water and exposed to the air; but when kept underwater in soil, the energy-rich tubers can overwinter temperatures below 0 °C (32 °F). If the plants are taken out of the water for wintertime storage (mostly in exceptionally cold climates), the tubers and roots must be stored in a stable, frost-free location, such as a garage, preferably in a cardboard box or container filled completely with vermiculite or perlite. Care must be taken to fully insulate the tubers.

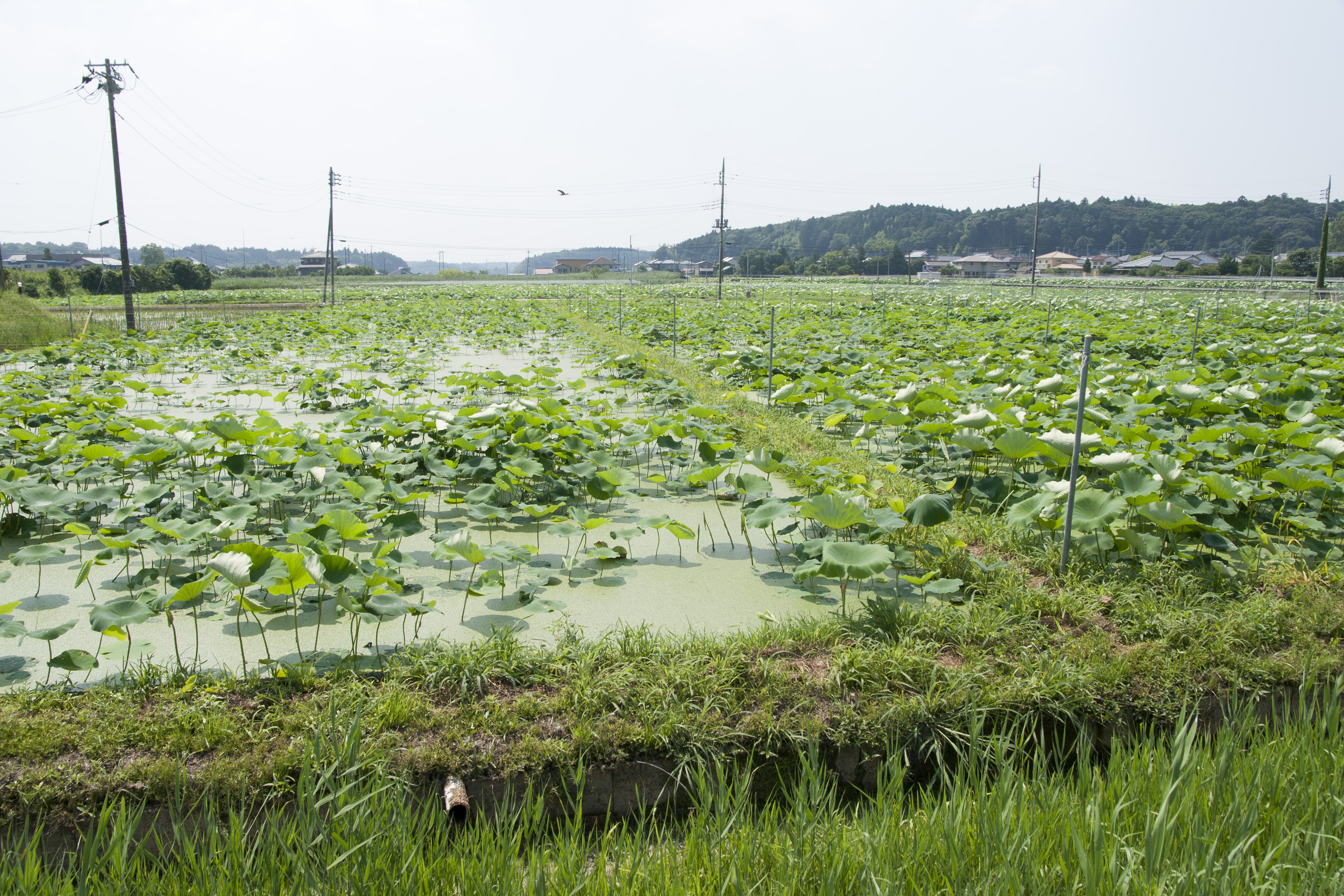
Flooded lotus field

=== Planting ===
The sacred lotus requires a nutrient-rich and loam soil. In the beginning of the summer period (from March until May in the northern hemisphere), a small part of rhizome with at least one eye is either planted in ponds or directly into a flooded field. It can also be propagated via seeds or buds. Furthermore, tissue culture is a promising propagation method for the future to produce high volumes of uniform, true-to-type, disease-free materials.

The first step of cultivation is to plough the dry field. One round of manure is applied after ten days, before flooding the field. To support a quick initial growth, the water level is relatively low and increases when plants grow. Then a maximum of approximately 4,000 per hectare (1,600/acre) with grid spacing of 1.2 by 2 metres (3 ft 11 in × 6 ft 7 in) are used to plant directly into the mud 10–15 cm (3 7/8–5 7/8 in) below the soil surface.

=== Harvest ===
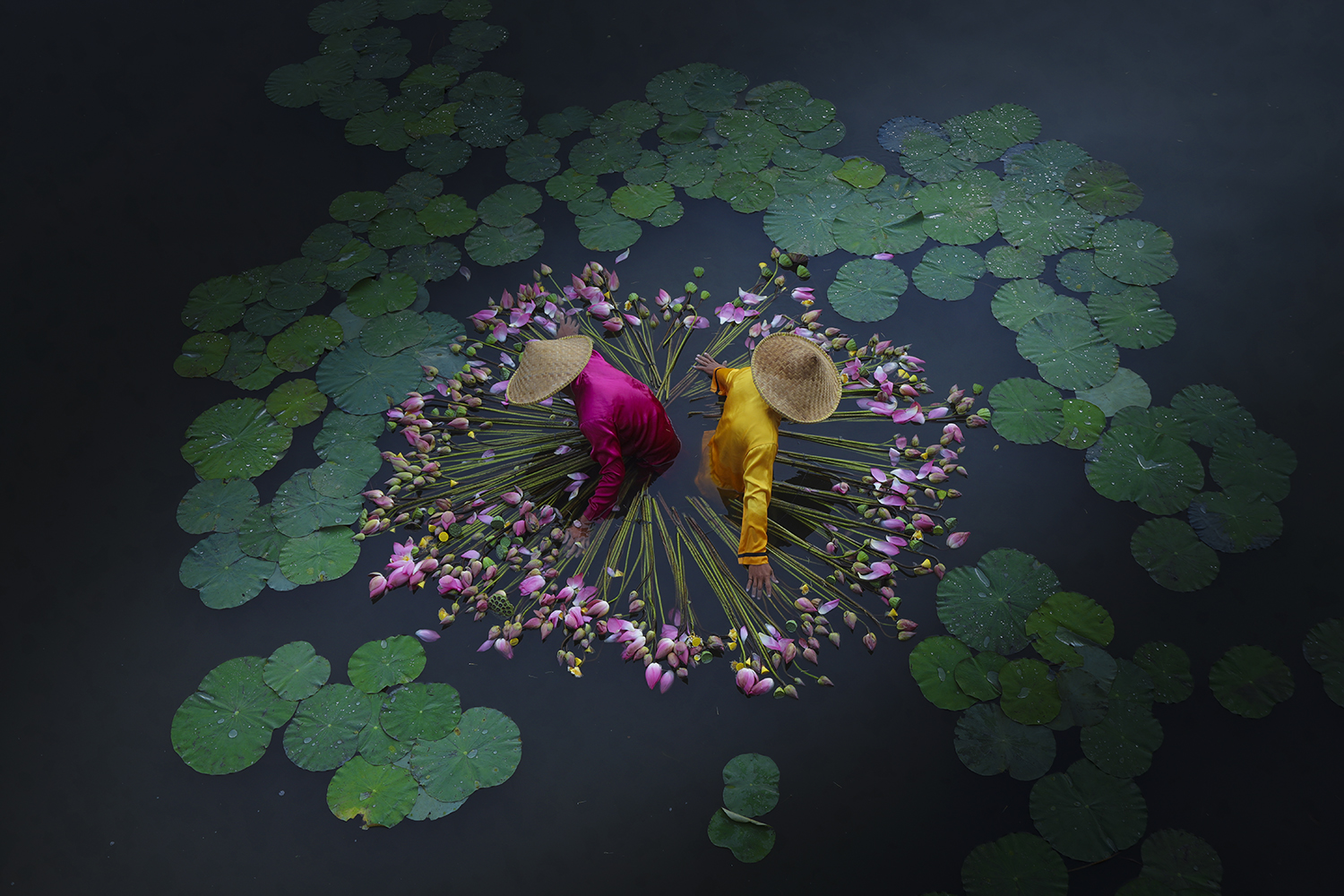
Farmers harvesting lotus flowers

The stolon is ready to harvest two to three months after planting. It must be harvested before flowering. Harvesting the stolon is done by manual labor. For this step, the field is not drained. The stolon is pulled out of the water by pulling and shaking the young leaves in the shallow water.

The first leaves and flowers can be harvested three months after planting. Flowers can be picked every two days during summer and every three days during the colder season. Four months after planting, the production of flowers has its climax. The harvest of flowers is usually done by hand for three to four months.

Seeds and seed pods can be harvested when they turn black four to eight months after planting. After sun drying for two to three days, they are processed by mechanical tools to separate seed coats and embryos.

The rhizomes mature to a suitable stage for eating in approximately six to nine months. Early varieties are harvested in July until September and late varieties from October until March, after the ponds or fields are drained. The large, starch-rich rhizomes are easy to dig out of the drained soil. In small-scale production, they are harvested by hand using fork-like tools. In Japan and on bigger farms, manual labour harvesting is fully replaced by machines.

=== Varieties and cultivars ===
Lotus varieties have been classified according to their use into three types: rhizome lotus, seed lotus, and flower lotus. Varieties that show more than one of these characteristics are classified by the strongest feature. Regarding production area in China, rhizome lotus has the largest area with 200,000 ha (490,000 acres), followed by seed lotus with 20,000 ha (49,000 acres).

==== Rhizome lotus ====
Rhizome lotus cultivars produce a higher yield and higher quality rhizomes than seed or flower lotus cultivars. Furthermore, this group grows tall and produces few to no flowers.

Cultivars can be classified by harvest time or by the depth of rhizomes into 3×3 types:

- Early cultivars are harvested before the end of July, Late ("serotinous") cultivars from September on, and Mid-Termed ("mid-serotinous") cultivars are in between these harvest times. Using Early cultivars, rhizomes can be harvested earlier and sold for a higher price.
- Shallow (adlittoral), Deep, and Intermediate cultivars are distinguished according to the depth in which the rhizomes grow underground. Shallow cultivars range from 10 to 20 cm (3.9 to 7.9 in) depth and are often Early. They develop faster due to higher temperatures in surface soil layers. When harvested in July, Shallows have higher yields than Deeps but not necessarily when harvested in September. Rhizomes of Shallows are crisp and good for frying purposes. Deeps grow more than 40 cm (16 in) deep. They are often Late and can harvest high yields. Their rhizomes are starch-rich.

The main popular Nelumbo nucifera cultivars in China are Elian (鄂莲, "Hubei Lotus") 1, Elian 4, Elian 5, 9217, Xin 1 (新一号, "new 1"), and 00–01. The average yield of these cultivars is 7.5–15 t/ha (3.3–6.7 tons/acre) of harvest in July and 30–45 t/ha (13–20 tons/acre) of harvest in September. In Australia, the cultivar grown for the fresh rhizome market in Guangdong and Japan, the common rhizome cultivars are Tenno and Bitchu.

==== Seed lotus ====
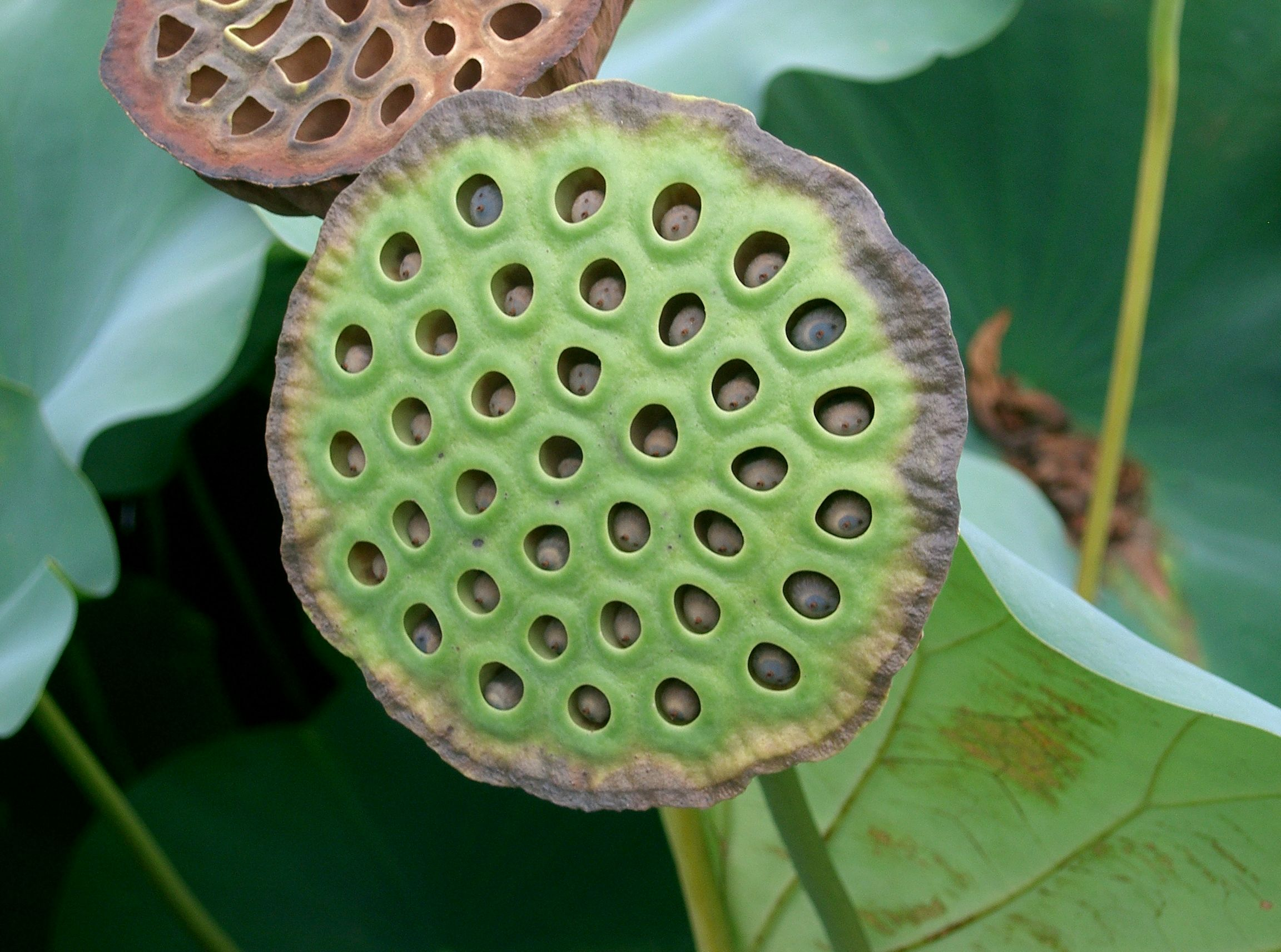
Nelumbo nucifera seed head

The characteristics of seed lotus cultivars are a large number of carpels and seed sets as well as large seeds with better nutritional properties. Roots of these varieties are thin, fibrous, and do not form good rhizomes. The main popular cultivars for seed production in China are Cunsanlian, Xianglian 1, Zilian 2, Jianlian, Ganlian 62, and Taikong 36. The average yield of these cultivars in China is 1.05–1.9 t/ha (0.5–0.8 tons/acre) of dry seeds and weight of thousand seeds between 1,020 and 1,800 g (36 and 63 oz). Green Jade and Vietnam-Red are recommended cultivars for seed production in Australia.

==== Flower lotus ====
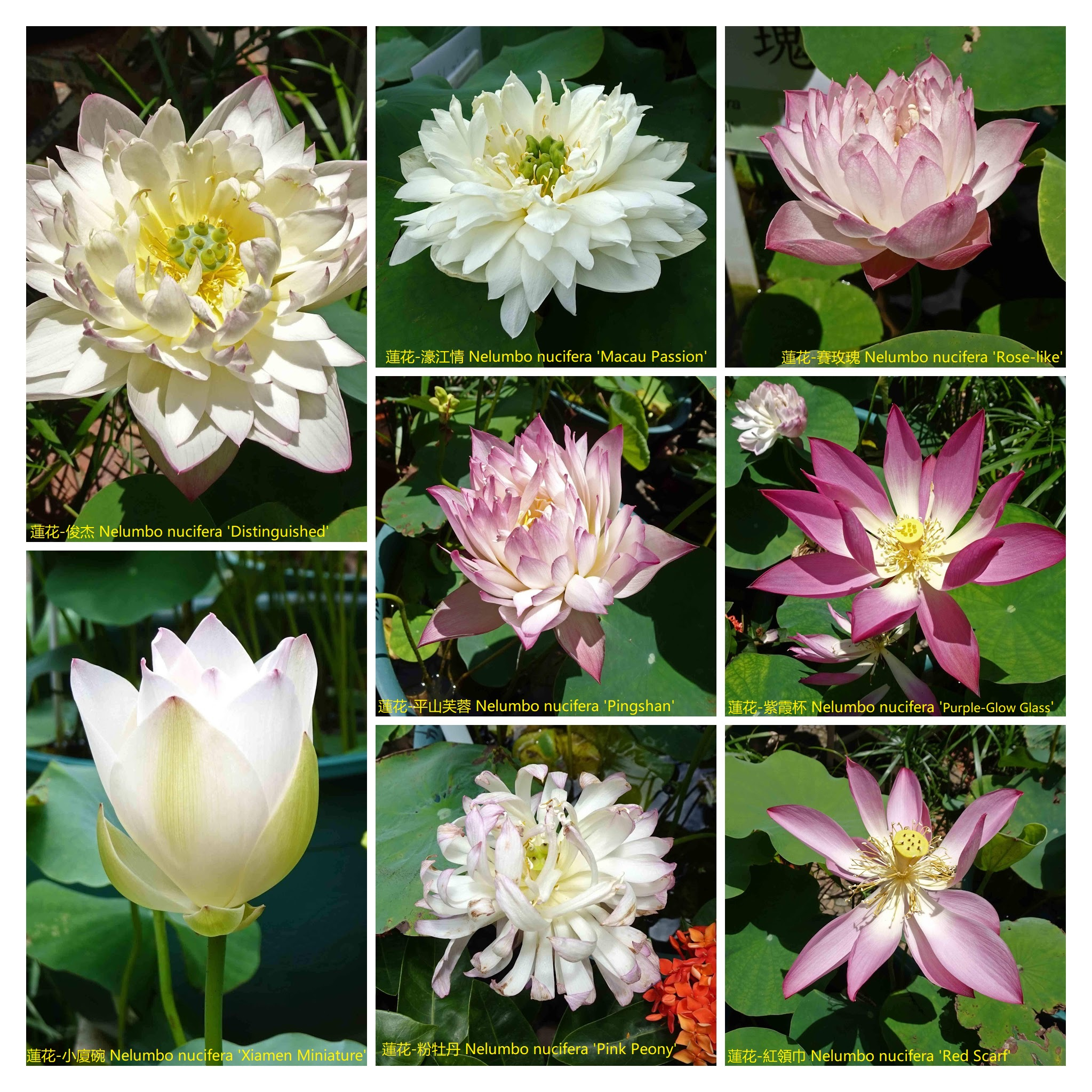
Nelumbo nucifera cultivars

Flower lotus cultivars are used exclusively for ornamental purpose, producing many flowers and the lowest plant height.

The seed production of flower lotus is typically poor regarding yield and quality. Flower types differ in the number of petals (single petals, double petals, or multi-petals) and their colours range from single colour in white, yellow, pink, and red to bi-colour, most often of white petals with pink tips or highlights.

One example of a flower lotus is Wanlian. Also known as bowl lotus, wanlians are any miniature cultivars of N. nucifera sized between 5 and 8 centimetres (2.0 and 3.1 in). Bowl lotuses come in various colours and numbers of petals, and they bloom longer than other species of lotus. But together with the rhizome, their seeds are often too small or too hard to be edible.

The sacred lotus may be crossed with the yellow lotus to produce interspecific hybrids. A few cultivars have been produced with differing appearances.

=== Farming ===
About 70% of lotus for human consumption is produced in China. In 2005, the cultivation area in China was estimated at 300,000 hectares (740,000 acres).

A majority of lotus production takes place in managed farming systems in ponds or flooded fields like rice.

There are three main ways of producing these flowers:

1. The most widely used system of crop rotation with rice and vegetables. This system is applicable if the propagule (small piece of rhizome) can be planted early in the year. The rhizomes are harvested in July, after which rice can be planted in the same field. Rice is then harvested in October. From November until March, the field stays either free or contains non-aquatic vegetables, such as cabbage or spinach. Alternatively, the vegetable can also be planted after the harvest of the lotus.
2. Another alternative way is not to harvest the lotus rhizome, even though it is already ripe. A non-aquatic vegetable is planted between the rhizomes into the drained field. The rhizomes are then harvested next March.
3. A third way is to plant lotus in ponds or fields and raise aquatic animals such as fish, shrimp, or crab in the same field. A more efficient use of the water for both, the aquatic animals and lotus production has been identified with this planting pattern.

== Use ==
=== Religious ===
Lotus flowers are widely used as offerings to most female deities, especially Lakshmi, in Hindu temples. Among male deities, lotuses are offered to Vishnu for prosperity and to Shiva for salvation. Garlands made of lotuses are used for adorning deities and lotus petals are used in puja. Lotus seeds are also used in prayer beads. Lotuses are also offered to the Buddha in most Buddhist temples. Lotus is also widely used in Varamala (Hindu wedding garland).

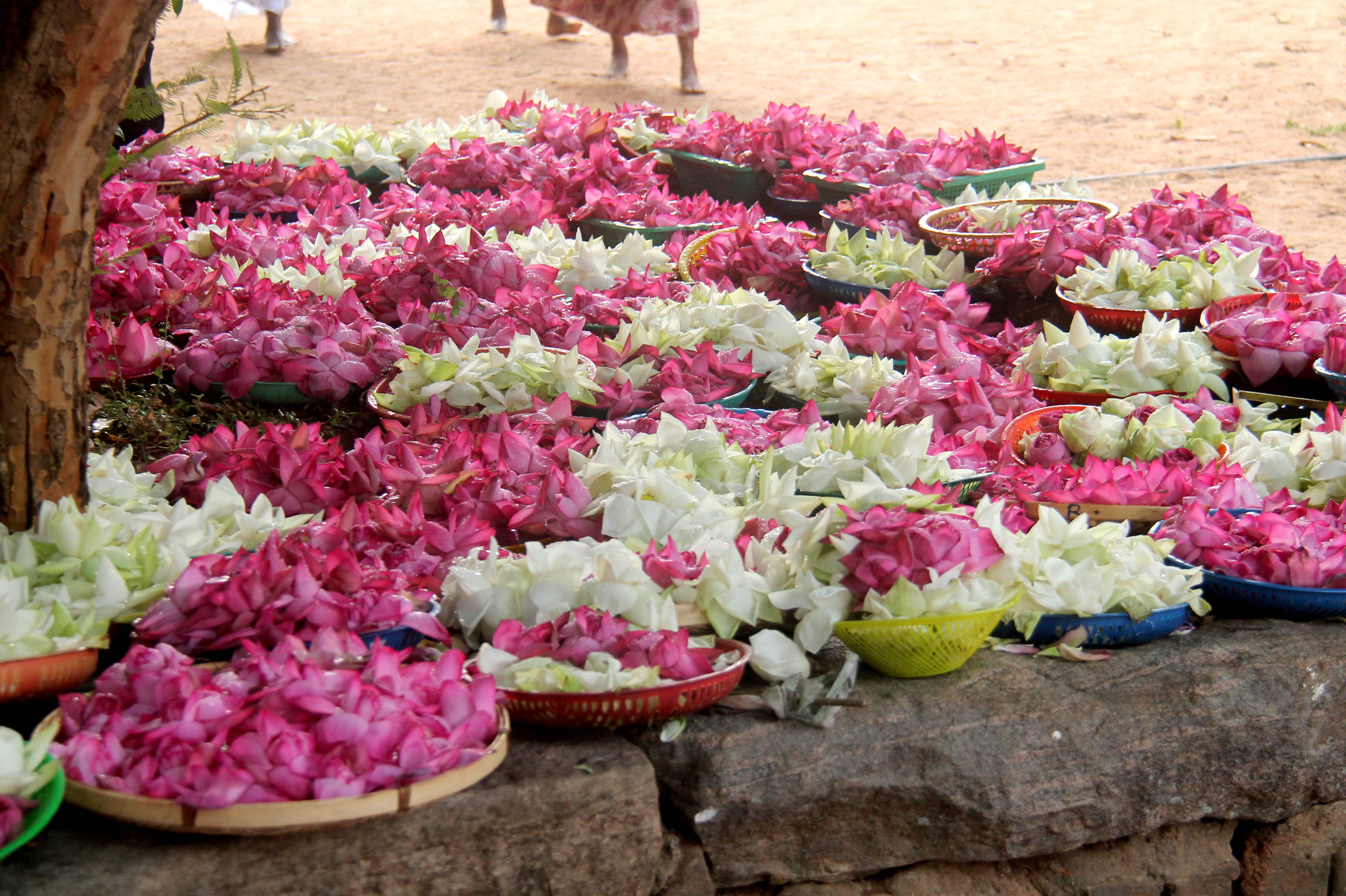
Lotus offering

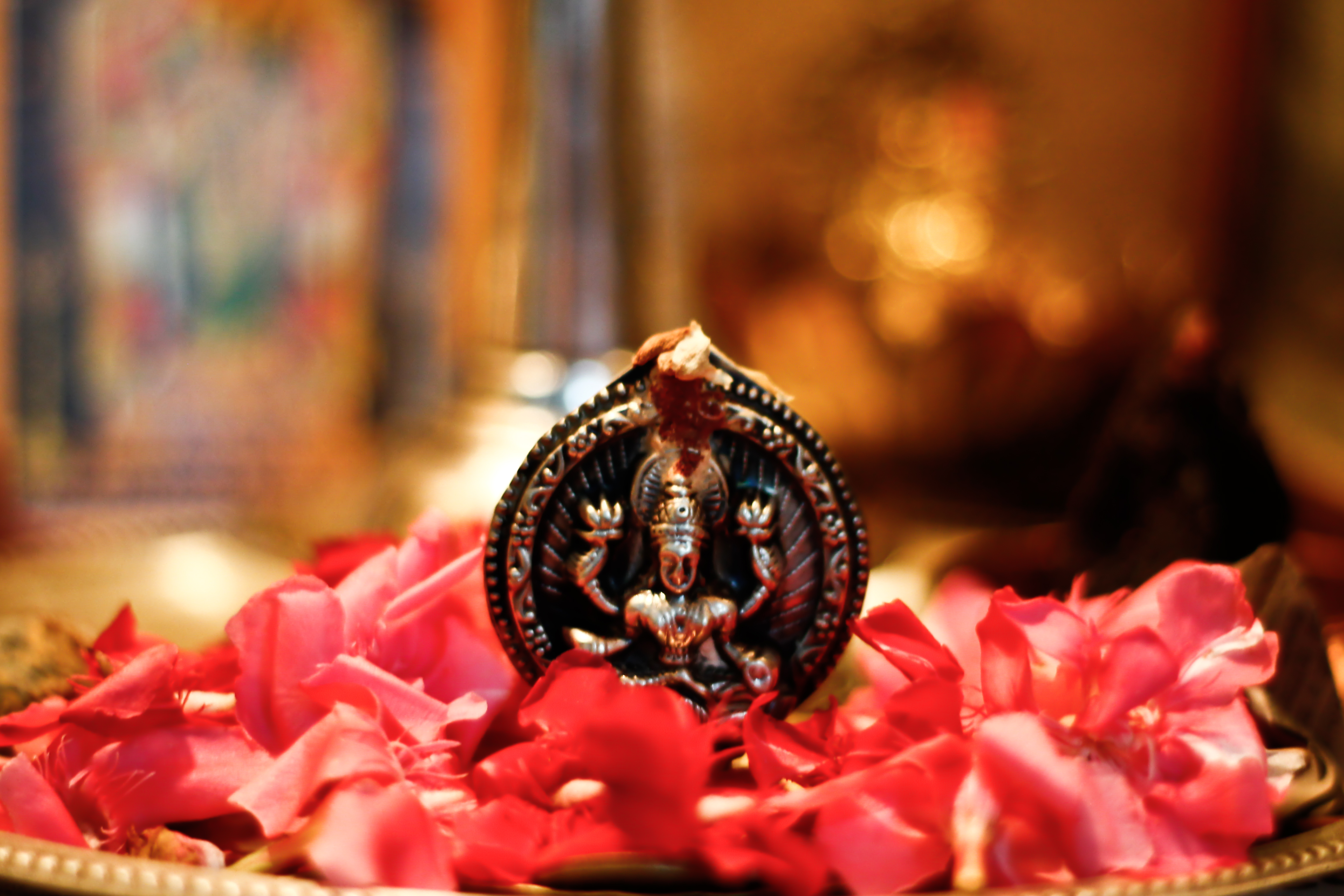
Lakshmi adorned with lotus petals

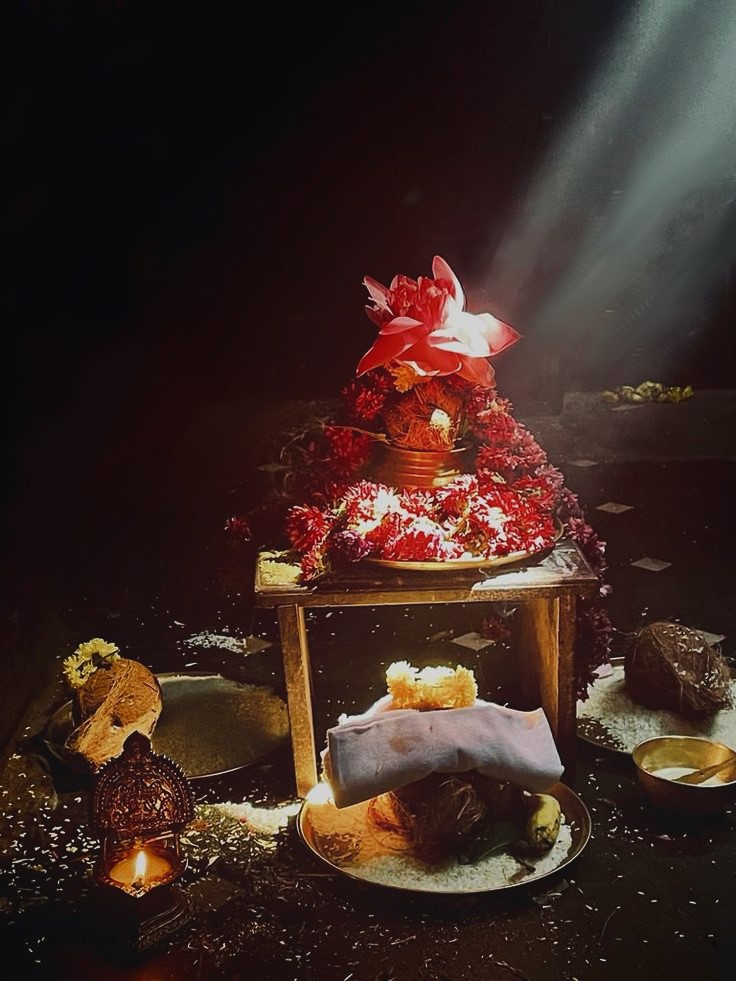
Lotus is widely used in Hindu Pooja

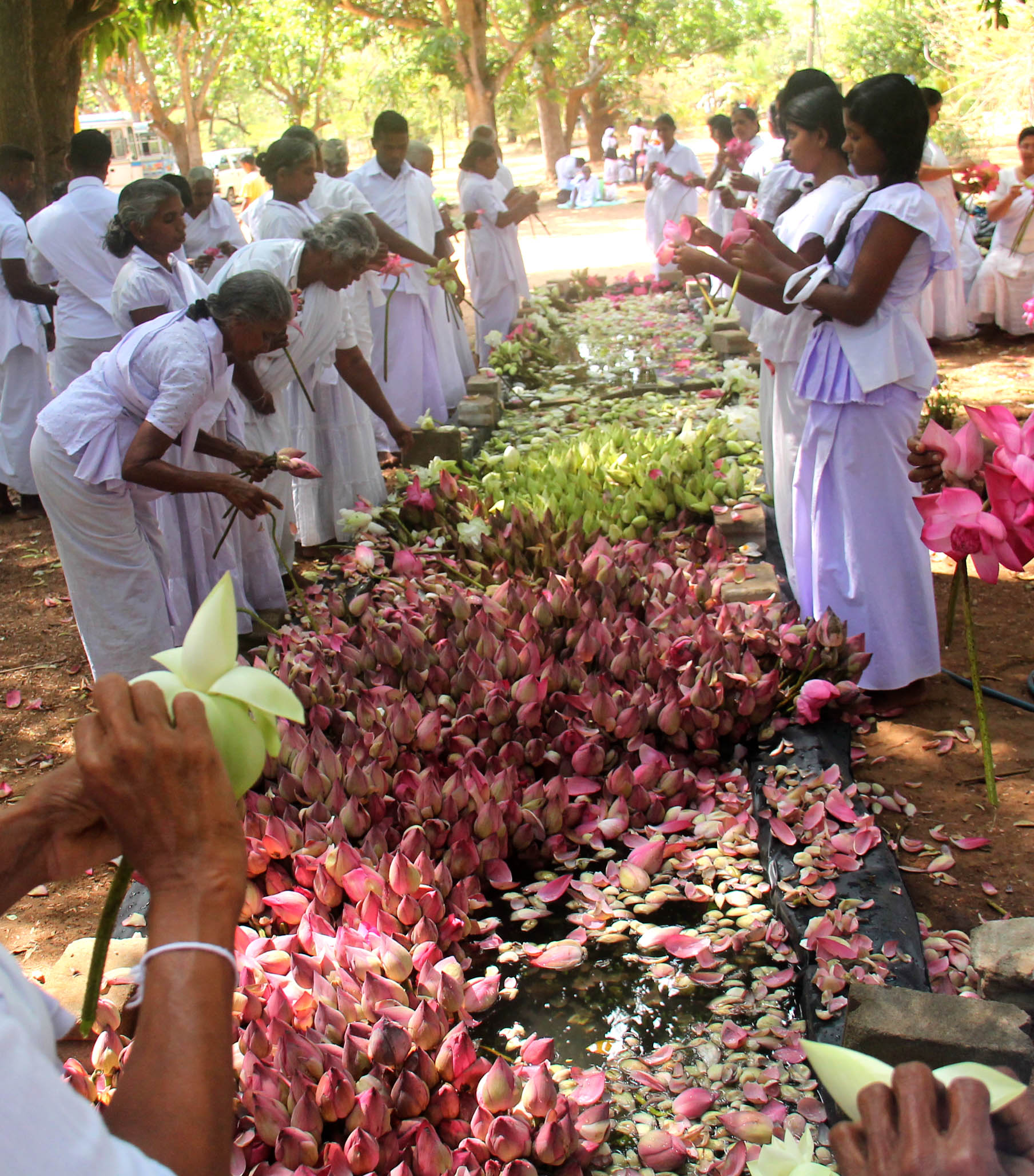
Buddhists preparing for lotus puja in Sri Lanka

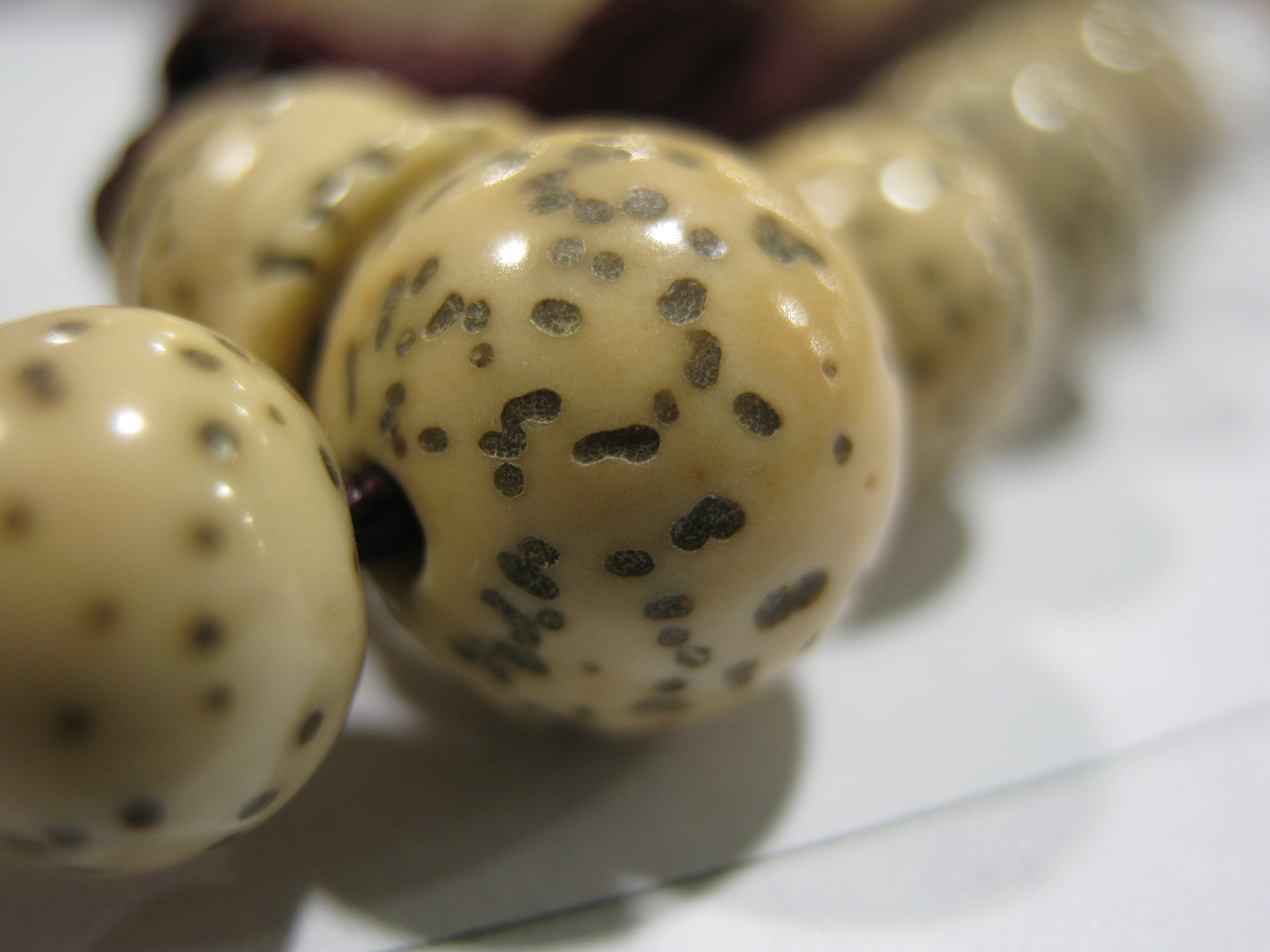
Lotus seed on a mala

=== Culinary ===
==== Rhizomes ====
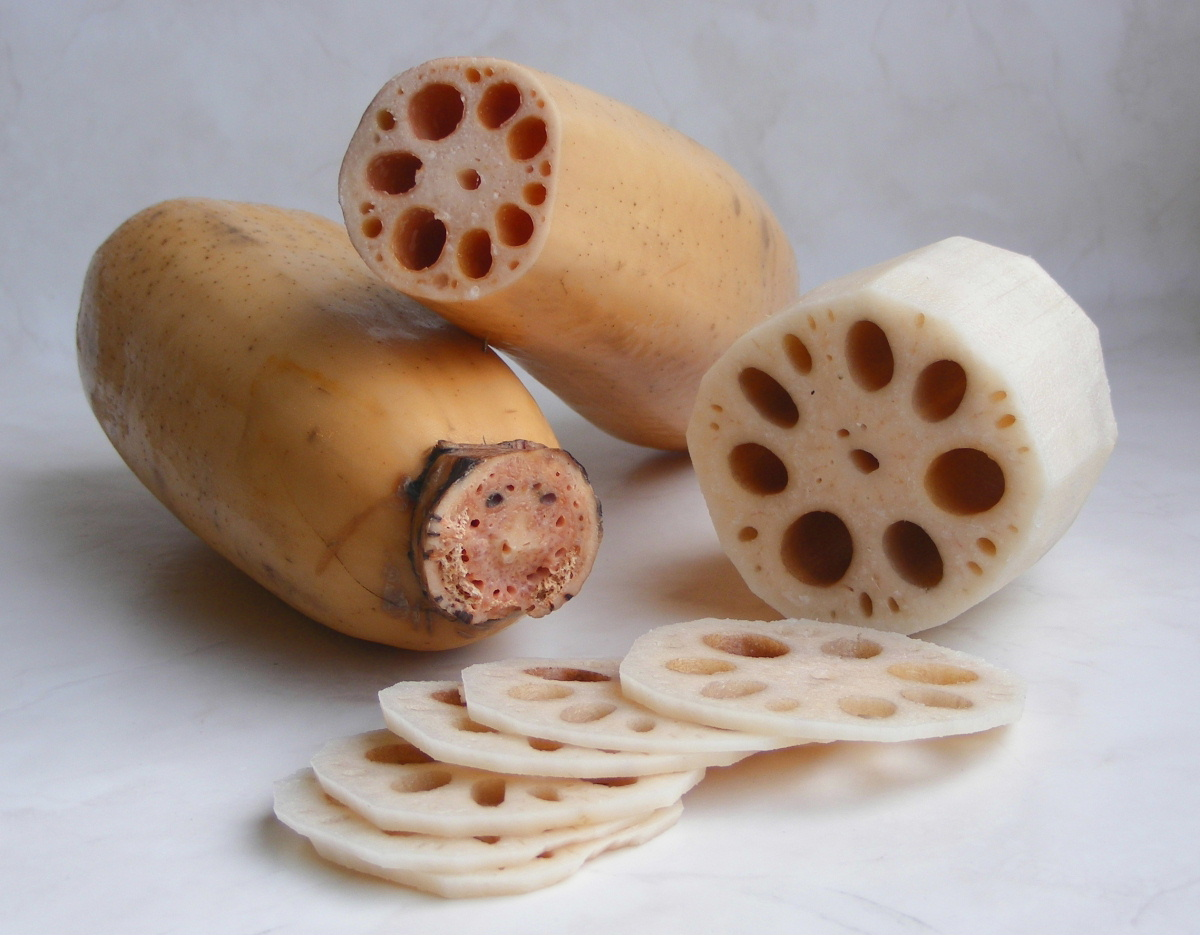
Lotus rhizomes

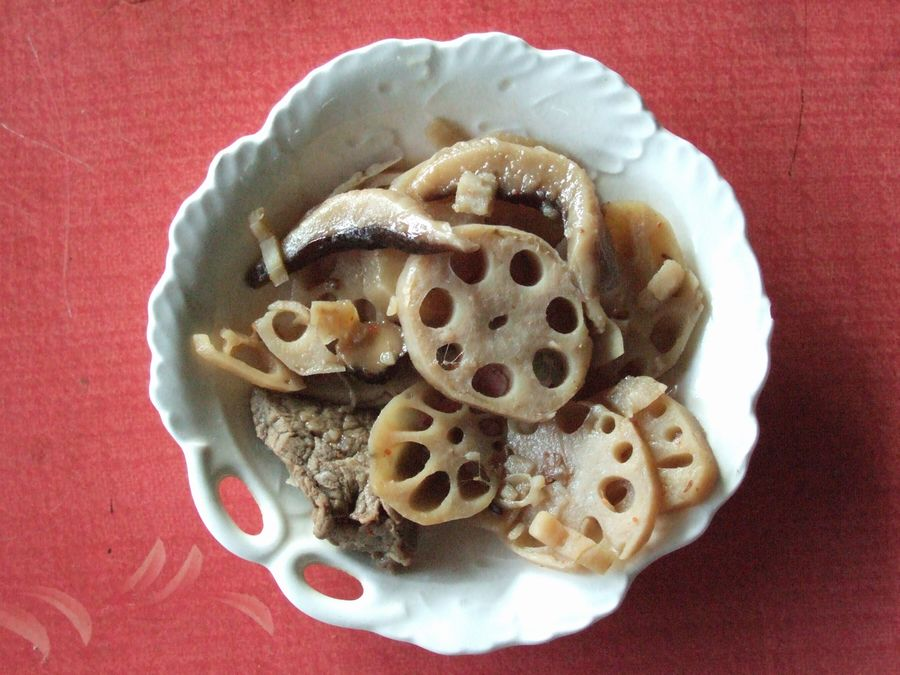
Boiled, sliced lotus roots used in various Asian cuisines

The rhizomes of lotus (Chinese: 蓮藕; pinyin: lián'ǒu, Japanese: 蓮根, romanized: renkon, Kashmiri: Nadurᵘ, Korean: 연근; Hanja: 蓮根; RR: yeongeun, Hindi: कमल ककड़ी, romanized: kamala kakaṛī, Sindhi Beeh, Telugu: అల్లిదుంప, romanized: alli'dumpa) are consumed as a vegetable in Asian countries, extensively in China, Japan, India, Pakistan (Sindh). They are sold whole or in cut pieces, fresh, frozen, or canned. They can be fried, cooked in soups, soaked in syrup, or pickled in vinegar (with sugar, chili and garlic). Lotus rhizomes have a crunchy texture and are a classic dish at many banquets, where they are deep-fried, stir-fried, or stuffed with meats or preserved fruits. Salads with prawns, sesame oil or coriander leaves are also popular. Fresh lotus root slices brown quickly. Lotus root tea is consumed in Korea.

Lotus root is a popular vegetable in Sri Lanka, where it is often cooked in coconut milk gravy. In India, lotus root (also known as kamala kakaṛī in Hindi) is cooked as a dry curry or sabzî.

Japan is one of the primary users of the rhizomes, where it represents about 1% of all vegetables consumed. Japan grows its own lotus but still must import 18,000 tons of lotus rhizome each year, of which China provides 15,000 tons yearly.

The rhizomes of Nelumbo nucifera contain high amounts of starch (31.2%) without a characteristic taste or odor. The texture is comparable to a raw potato. The binding and disintegration properties of the isolated starch have been compared with maize and potato starch; the starch was shown to be superior as an adjuvant in the preparation of tablets. When dried, N. nucifera rhizomes can also be made into flour, another popular use of this vegetable.

==== Seeds ====
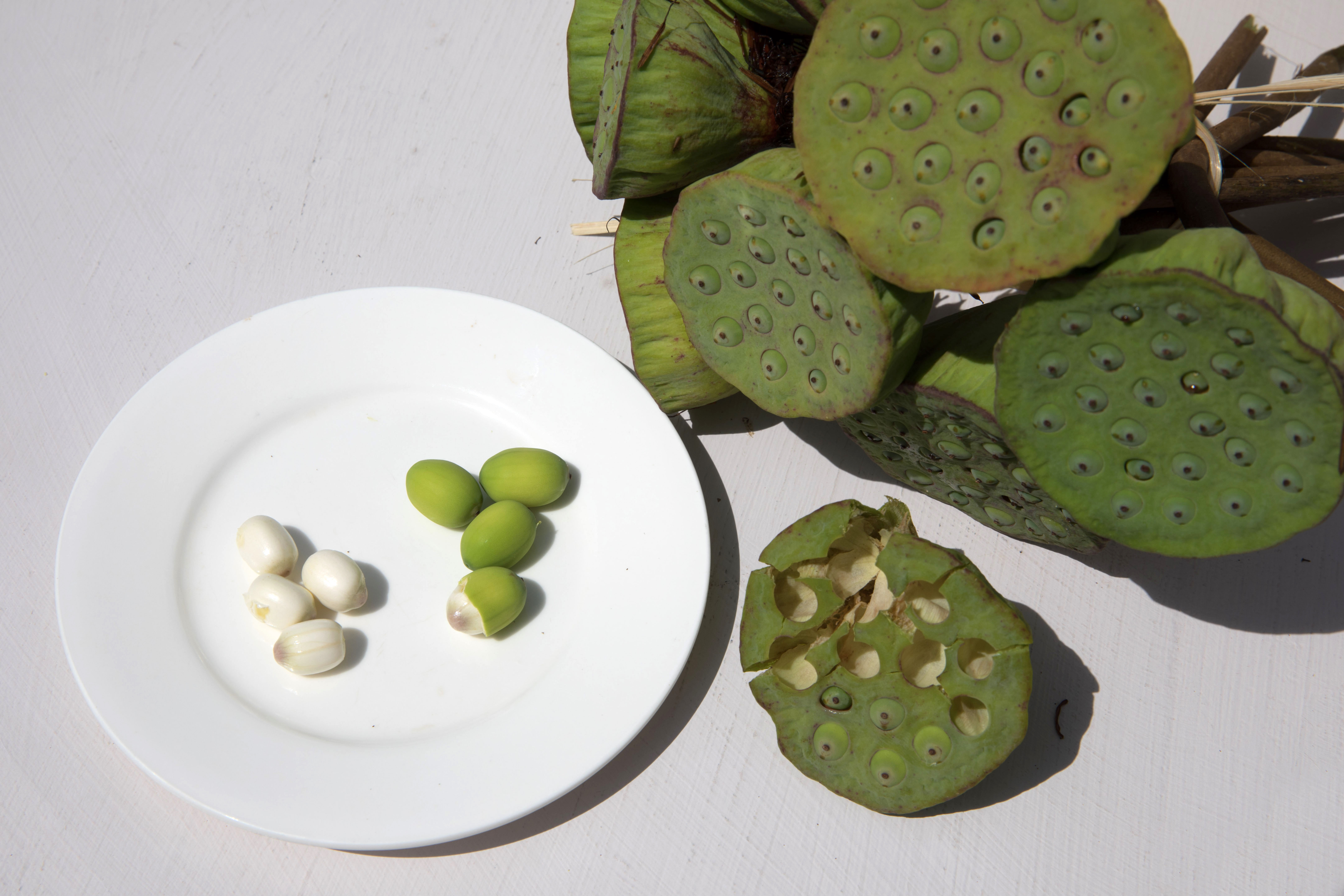
Fresh lotus seeds ready to eat

Fresh lotus seeds (simplified Chinese: 莲子; traditional Chinese: 蓮子; pinyin: liánzǐ; Cantonese Yale: lìhnjí،, Kashmiri: Pambach) are nutritious but also vulnerable to microbial contamination, especially fungal infections. Therefore, mostly dry lotus seed-based products are found on the market. Traditional sun baking combined with charcoal processing dries the seeds but results in a loss of nutrients. Freeze-dried lotus seeds have a longer shelf life and maintain original nutrients, while no differences in flavour are found after rehydration compared to fresh lotus seeds.

Dry stored lotus seeds are sensitive to moisture and mold infestation; researchers continue to explore new ways to preserve fresh lotus seeds, such as radiation processing.

Lotus seeds can be processed into fillings for moon cake, lotus seed noodles and food in the forms of paste, fermented milk, rice wine, ice cream, popcorn (phool makhana), and others, with lotus seeds as the main raw material. Traditional Chinese medicine claims that fresh lotus seed wine has thirst-quenching, spleen-healing, and anti-diarrheal advantages after drinking, attributed to unspecified bioactive compounds. Lotus seed tea and lotus fruit tea is consumed in Korea, and lotus embryo tea is consumed in China and Vietnam.

==== Stems ====
Young lotus stems are used as a salad ingredient in Vietnamese cuisine and as a vegetable ingredient for some soup and curry in Thailand, such as keang som sai bua (Thai: แกงส้มสายบัว, lotus stem sour soup) and keang kati sai bua (แกงกะทิสายบัว, lotus stem in coconut milk curry).

In northern and eastern regions of India, the stalk of the flower is used to prepare a soup, kamala gaṭṭē kī sabzī (Hindi: कमल गट्टे की सब्ज़ी) and an appetizer, kamala kakaṛī pakauṛē (Hindi: कमल ककड़ी पकौड़े). In South Indian states, the lotus stem is sliced, marinated with salt to dry, and the dried slices are fried and used as a side dish. In Kerala (Malayalam: താമര) and Tamil Nadu, this end product is called thamara vathal.

In the Philippines, an indigenous variety called tukal is used as the main ingredient in dishes with coconut milk. The stems and petals can be bought in markets when in season.

==== Leaves ====
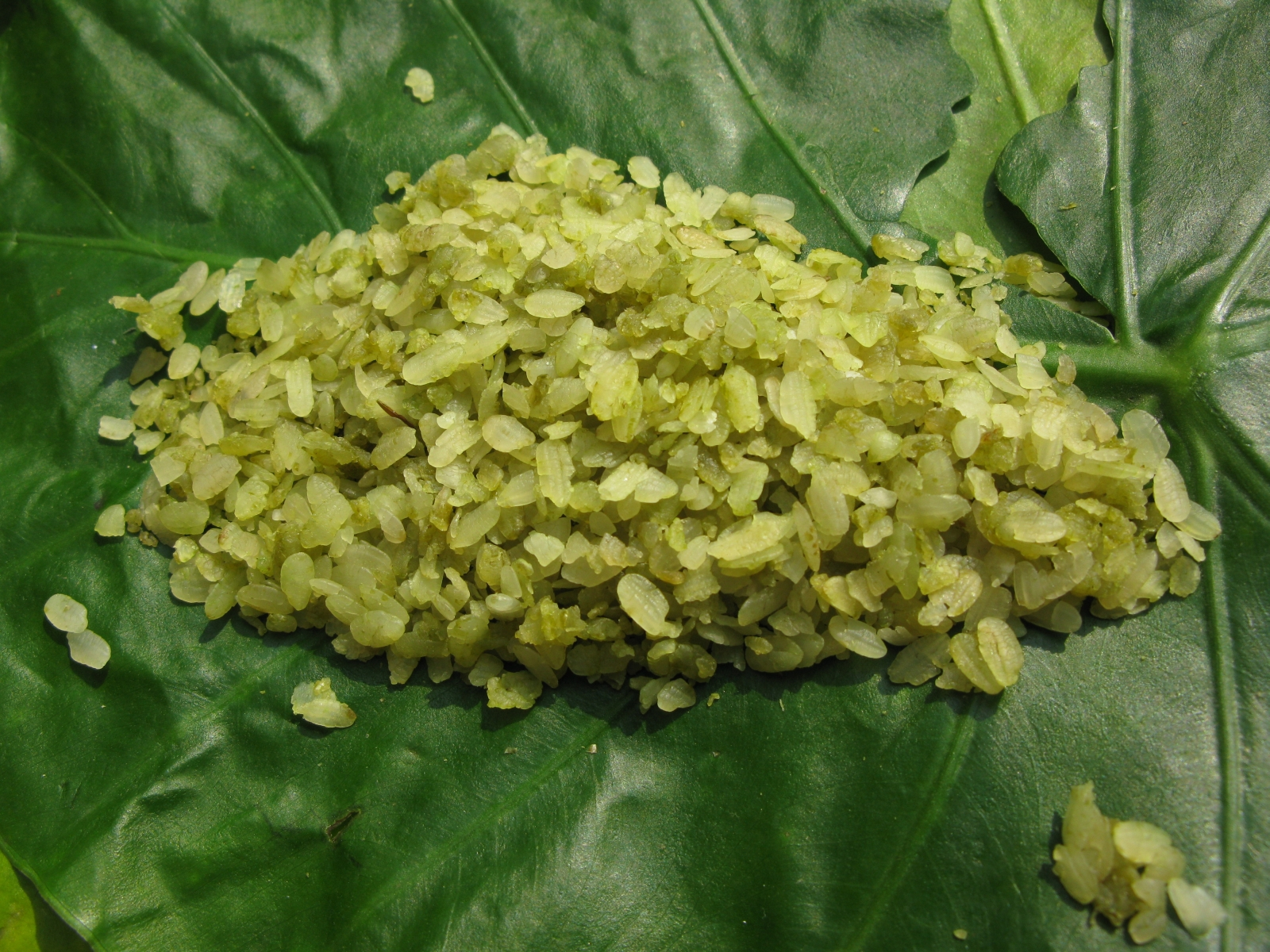
Vietnamese-style green young rice (cốm) wrapped in lotus leaves, traditionally consumed with ripe bananas and tea during autumn at the beginning of the rice harvest

In China and Korea, lotus leaf tea (Korean: 연잎차; RR: yeonnipcha) is made from the leaves of the lotus. Lotus leaves are also used to serve food in various cultures. It is used as a wrap for steaming rice and sticky rice and other steamed dishes in Asian cuisines, such as lo mai gai and zongzi in Chinese cuisine, kao hor bai bua (Thai: ข้าวห่อใบบัว) fried rice wrapped in lotus leaf in Thai cuisine. Vietnamese also use lotus leaves to wrap green young rice, cốm, which is eaten in autumn. The leaves impart a unique scent to the soft, moist rice.

==== Flowers ====
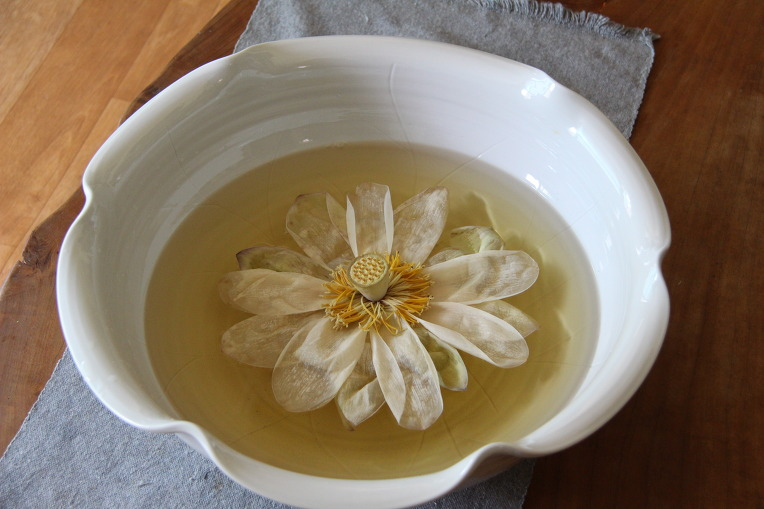
Lotus flower tea

In Korea, lotus flower tea (Korean: 연꽃차; RR: yeonkkotcha) is made from the dried petals of the white lotus.

The stamens can be dried and made into a fragrant herbal tea (Chinese: 蓮花 茶; pinyin: liánhuā cha; Cantonese Yale: lìhnfāa chah), or used to impart a scent to tea leaves (particularly in Vietnam). This Vietnamese lotus tea is called trà sen, chè sen, or chè ướp sen.

==== Risks ====
The petals, leaves, and rhizome can also all be eaten raw, but there is a risk of parasite transmission (e.g., Fasciolopsis buski): it is therefore recommended that they be cooked before eating.

=== Use in water treatment ===
Nelumbo nucifera shows high potential for usage in wastewater treatment removing polluting compounds and heavy metals. It is able to grow in variable water conditions and in low light intensity. Various studies show the successful use of N. nucifera to counteract water eutrophication. The leaves of the floating lotus reduce sunlight reaching the lower part of the water. This suppresses algae growth in N. nucifera aquatic systems and thus, the oxygen content is up to 20% higher than in other aquatic plant systems. Due to intense agricultural practices, nitrogen and phosphorus pollution are major problems in aquatic systems. N. nucifera is able to assimilate a higher content of phosphorus than aquatic plants currently used for water remediation (especially water hyacinth). It also assimilates nitrogen ("denitrification") and creates a habitat for bacterial growth in the water body.

Through rhizofiltration, heavy metals – including arsenic, copper, and cadmium – can be removed efficiently from the water. The results observed are impressive showing 96% of copper and 85% cadmium metals removed after a seven-day period. The accumulation of heavy metals doesn't cause visible symptoms of metal toxicity on the plant; however, whether the rhizomes are fit for human consumption needs further study.

=== Storage and commercial use ===
Currently, most rhizomes are consumed fresh, and it is not common to store them due to their poor shelf life performance. This limits export possibilities for producing countries in Asia. Rhizomes lose water quickly, oxidation occurs, and nutrient composition changes within a short time after harvest. Optimal storage temperatures range between 5 and 8 °C (41 and 46 °F). There are three different approaches to storing rhizomes. By stacking the rhizomes, they can be stored, remaining fresh for about three weeks. Special stacking with silver sand and soil results in five to six layers that prevent water loss, thus, the rhizome stays fresh for up to two months. However, this method is not suitable for commercial sale but rather for home use. Hydrogen sulfide fumigation reduces enzymatic browning and therefore ensures rhizome quality. Dipping the rhizomes in a salt solution prevents oxidation and bacterial reproduction, which allows storage for up to five months and greater export ability. This treatment is related to the high cost and inefficient cleaning process before eating the rhizomes.

=== Use in bioengineering ===
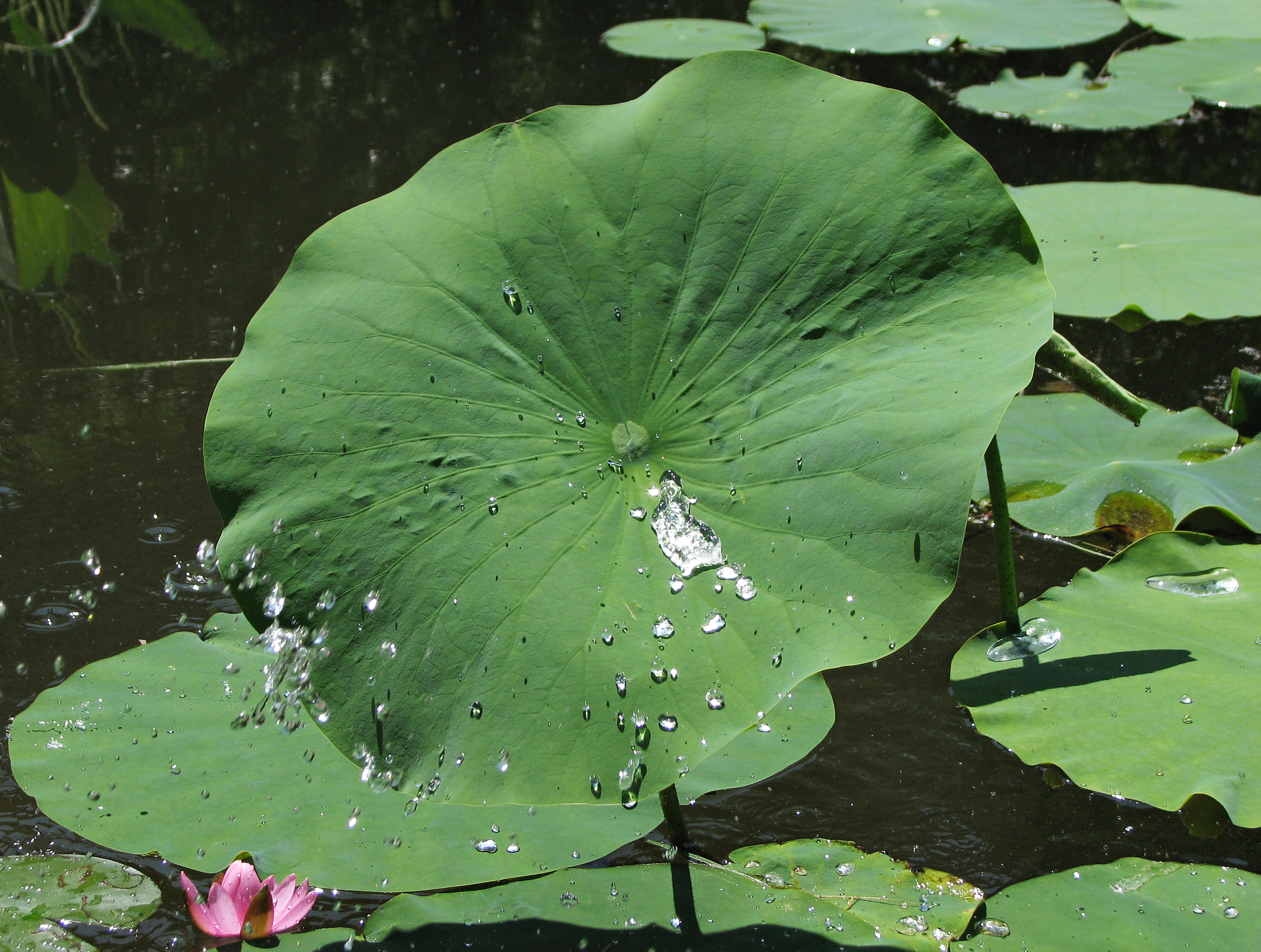
Lotus effect on nelumbo nucifera hybrid

Nelumbo nucifera contains some thermal-stable proteins that might be useful in protein bioengineering processes. The proteins are characterized by seed longevity used for cell protection and repair under stress. There are also several indications that compounds of N. nucifera are used in drug fabrication in human health research for multiple purposes. Lotus leaves possess hydrophobic characteristics, attributed to a waxy coat that prevents water from adhering to the surface. This attribute has influenced the conception of the "lotus effect" in biomimicry and engineering, guiding the design of materials that resist water and remain self-cleaning. Researchers at the National University of Singapore have utilized the water-repelling structure as inspiration for developing eAir, an aero-elastic sensor capable of detecting subtle pressure changes or other environmental stimuli.

=== Other uses ===
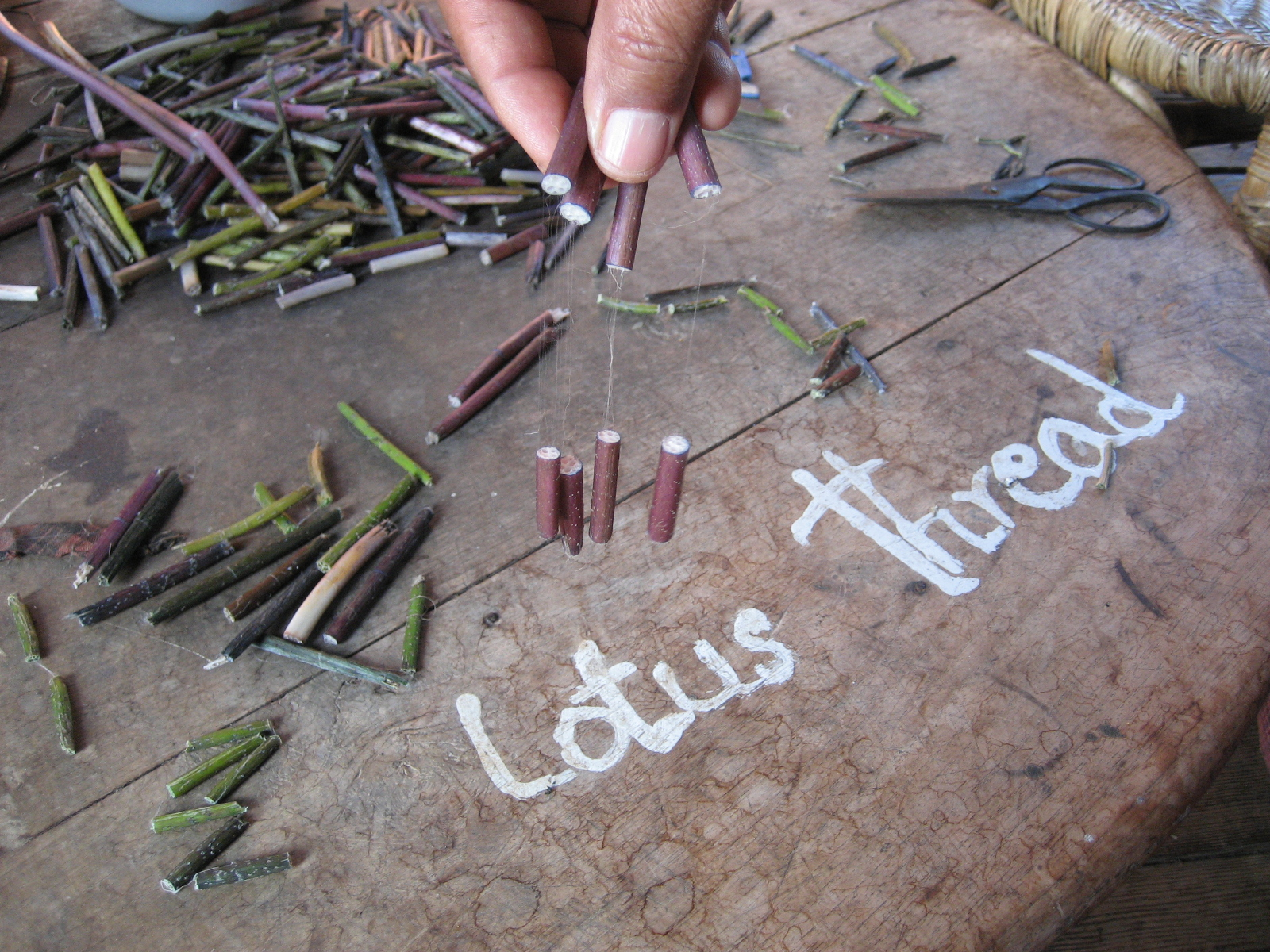
Lotus thread is used to weave a special robe for the Buddha at Inle Lake, Myanmar.

The distinctive dried seed heads, which resemble the spouts of watering cans, are widely sold throughout the world for decorative purposes and for dried flower arranging.

A unique fabric called lotus silk, from the lotus plant fibres, is produced only at Inle Lake, Myanmar, and in Siem Reap, Cambodia. This thread is used for weaving special robes for Buddha images called kya thingan (lotus robe).

== Chemical composition ==
The flavonol miquelianin, as well as the alkaloids (+)-(1R)-coclaurine and (−)-(1S)-norcoclaurine, can be found in the leaves of N. nucifera. The plant also contains nuciferine, neferine, and many other benzylisoquinoline alkaloids with medicinal properties.

=== Health properties and nutrients ===
==== Traditional medicine ====
Lotus root, cooked, no salt
Nutritional value per 100 g (3.5 oz)
- Energy: 278 kJ (66 kcal)
- Carbohydrates: 16.02 g
- Sugars: 0.50 g
- Dietary fibre: 3.1 g
- Fat: 0.07 g
- Protein: 1.58 g
Vitamins and minerals
| Vitamins | Quantity %DV^{†} |
| Thiamine (B1) | 11% 0.127 mg |
| Riboflavin (B2) | 1% 0.01 mg |
| Niacin (B3) | 2% 0.3 mg |
| Pantothenic acid (B5) | 6% 0.302 mg |
| Vitamin B6 | 13% 0.218 mg |
| Folate (B9) | 2% 8 μg |
| Choline | 5% 25.4 mg |
| Vitamin C | 30% 27.4 mg |
| Minerals | Quantity %DV^{†} |
| Calcium | 2% 26 mg |
| Iron | 5% 0.9 mg |
| Magnesium | 5% 22 mg |
| Manganese | 10% 0.22 mg |
| Phosphorus | 6% 78 mg |
| Potassium | 12% 363 mg |
| Sodium | 2% 45 mg |
| Zinc | 3% 0.33 mg |
- Other constituents: Quantity
- Water: 81.42 g
- Link to USDA Database entry
- ^{†}Percentages estimated using US recommendations for adults, except for potassium, which is estimated based on expert recommendation from the National Academies.

All parts of Nelumbo nucifera are edible, with the rhizome and seeds being the main consumption parts. Traditionally rhizomes, leaves, and seeds have been used as folk medicines, Ayurveda, Chinese traditional medicine, and oriental medicine. In Chinese medicine, seeds are still used as lian zi xin (蓮子心).

Lotus rhizomes and seeds and their processing by-products are widely consumed in Asia, the Americas, and Oceania as folk medicines. Especially in China, lotus seeds are popular with a cultural history going back about 3000 years. As early as the Han Dynasty, lotus seeds were already recorded as sweet, astringent, nourishing the heart and kidney in Shen Nong's Herbal Classic. Nowadays there are 22 varieties for the four known Chinese lines, which are found particularly in Jianning (still called "the town of Jianlian lotus seeds in China") and Guangchang ("the town of white lotus seeds in China").

These days the perennial aquatic herb is gaining popularity because of its nutraceutical and historical importance It will be of economic value if the different parts of lotus can be developed as functional food. Because of its special role in human health and richness in nutrients and bioactive substances, the Chinese Ministry of Health approved the use of N. nucifera as "both food and medicine" (药食同源).

==== Rhizomes ====
The rhizomes are 60–14 cm (23.6–5.5 in) long, 0.5–2.5 cm (0.20–0.98 in) in diameter, yellowish white to yellowish brown, smooth, and with nodes and internodes.

Lotus root is a moderate-calorie root vegetable (100 g of root stem provides about 74 calories) and is composed of several vitamins, minerals, and nutrients: 83.80% water, 0.11% fat, 1.56% reducing sugar, 0.41% sucrose, 2.70% crude protein, 9.25% starch, 0.80% fibre, 0.10% ash and 0.06% calcium. 100 g of root provides 44 mg of vitamin C or 73% of daily recommended values (RDA).

Lotus rhizome and its extracts have shown diuretic, psychopharmacological, anti-diabetic, anti-obesity, hypoglycemic, antipyretic and antioxidant activities.

==== Seeds ====
Lotus seeds are mostly oval or spherical, with sizes varying according to varieties. They are generally 1.2–1.8 cm long, with diameters ranging from 0.8 to 1.4 cm and a weight of 1.1–1.4 g. After lotus seeds have been decorticated and peeled, they are edible and rich in nutrients and can be dried for storage. Their nutritional values can differ due to culture environments and varieties.

Not only do these seeds contain proteins of high quality and are rich in a variety of essential amino acids including high contents of albumin (42%) and globulin (27%), they also contain unsaturated fatty acids, carbohydrates, vitamins, calcium, iron, zinc, phosphorus and other trace elements. They also provide water-soluble polysaccharides, alkaloids, flavonoids, superoxide dismutase, and other bioactive components.

Lotus seeds also contain particularly large amounts of vitamins, including VB1, VB2, VB6 and Vitamin E.

The functional components (polyphenols, protein, polysaccharides) in N. nucifera seeds can help combat high blood pressure, diabetes, and gallstones.

After lotus seed germination, crude protein and fat levels in the endosperm significantly increase. It is therefore an important method to enhance its nutritional quality.

==== Leaves ====
Nelumbo nucifera leaves contain the alkaloids nuciferine and aporphine.

== Cultural and religious significance ==
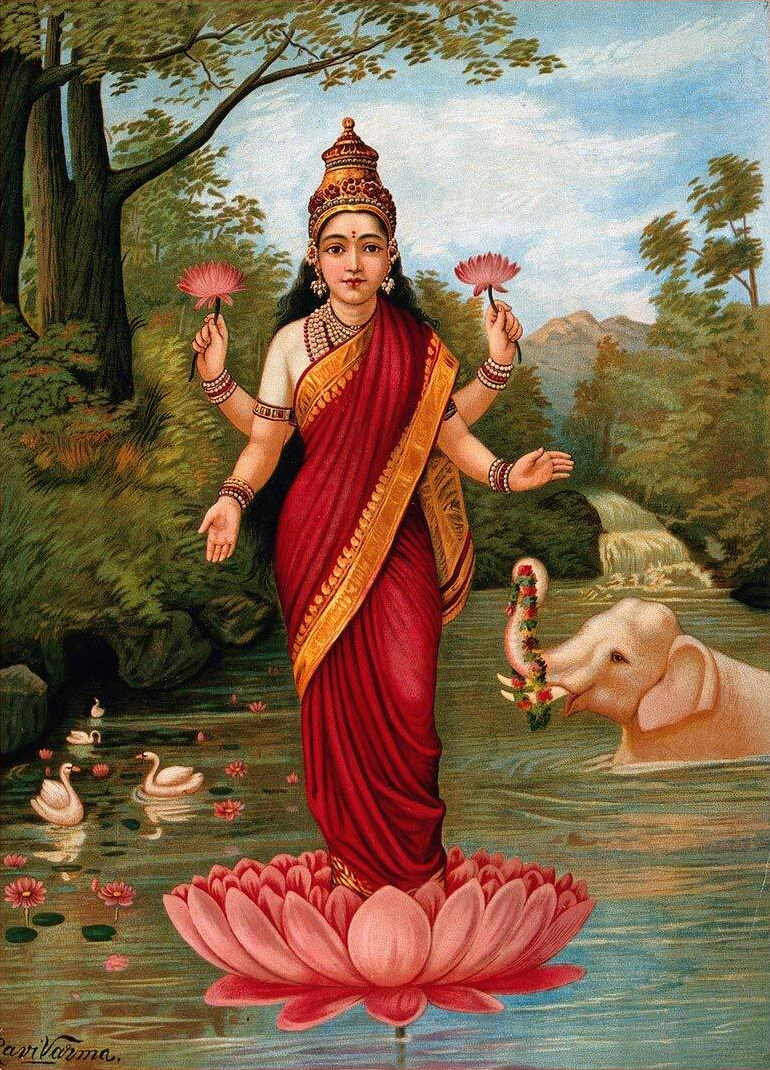
Lakshmi standing on a lotus

Nelumbo nucifera is a lotus species with historical, cultural and spiritual significance. It is a sacred flower in both Hinduism and Buddhism, representing the path to spiritual awakening and enlightenment. Lotus is closely associated with Goddess Lakshmi and her consort Vishnu. In Hindu iconography, Lakshmi is shown either in seated posture or as standing on top of a lotus flower and holding lotuses in two of her four hands. Vishnu is always portrayed with a lotus in one of his hands. Lotus or Padma exemplifies the path of one who leads a dharmic life. One can stay in the darkness, trapped in the comfort of the decaying leaves and murky water or struggle to lead a dharmic life upholding righteousness, following the light and eventually liberate oneself of his/her past thereby leading a prosperous peaceful happy life. Lotus also signifies moksha. The roots of lotus plant intertwined in mud representing the cycle of life and death and the lotus flower symbolizing the serene blissful state of moksha. Lotus is also used to depict the awakening of Kundalini energy in the tantric system of Hinduism.

In Hindu literature, lotus petals are used as a simile to praise the eyes of gods and goddesses. For instance, the word Kamalanayana (lotus-eyed) refers to Vishnu and it extols his eyes and praise him for being the one who holds the gaze/adoration of Kamala (Lakshmi).

The epic Mahabharata details the use of multi-tiered military formation that resembles a blooming lotus called Padmavyuha and its disc-shaped variant Chakravyuha in the 18-day long Kurukshethra war.

Sahasrara Chakra

Padmasana, or the lotus pose, in yoga and Sahasrara, the thousand petalled lotus chakra, in tantra are some examples of the use of lotus imagery. Lotus motifs are found in Indian architecture, for example: domes resembling lotus buds, pillars resembling lotus stalk, arches resembling inverted lotus, and other lotus engravings in Hindu and Buddhist temples.

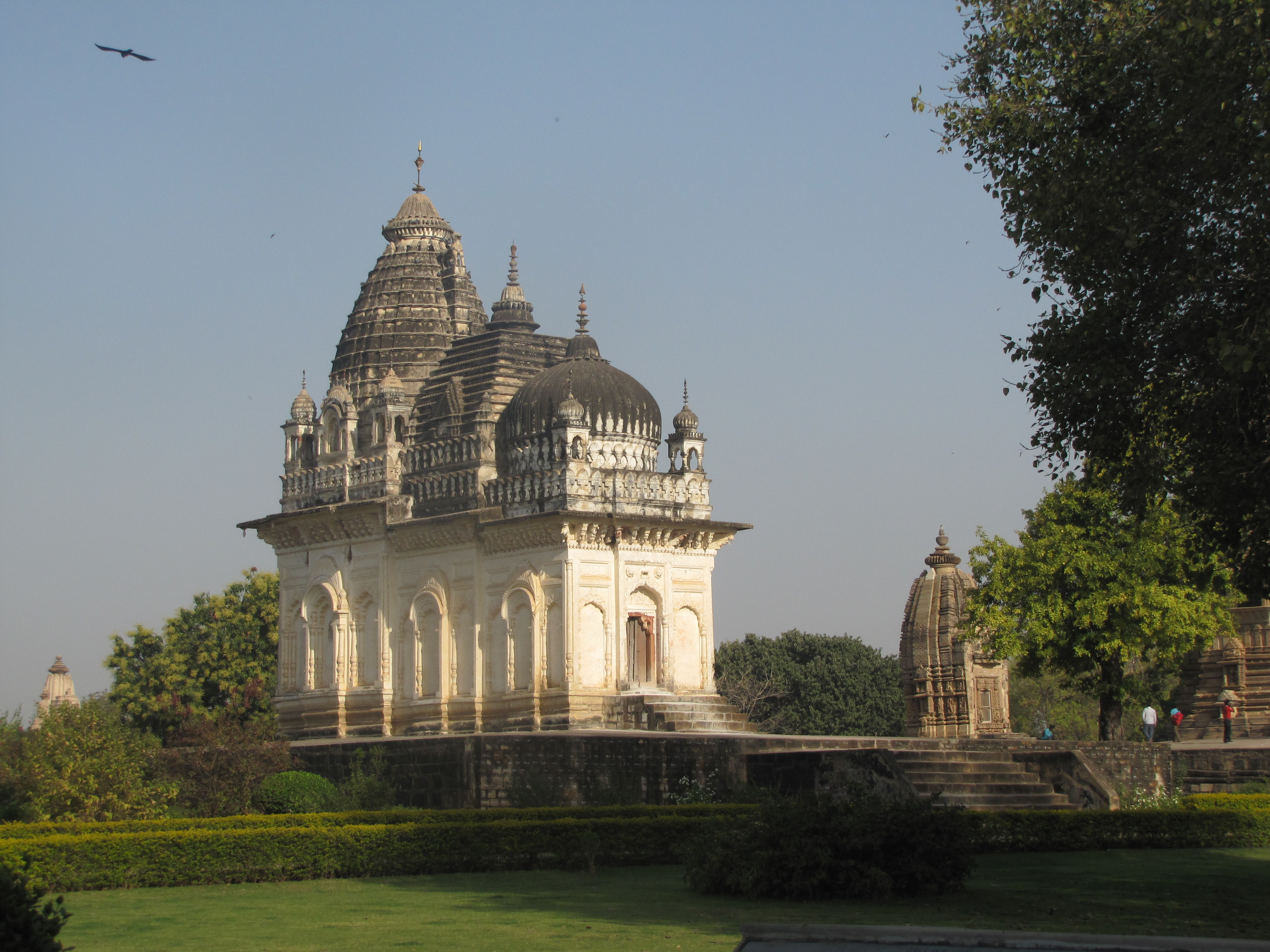
Parvati Temple with lotus bud domes at Khajuraho

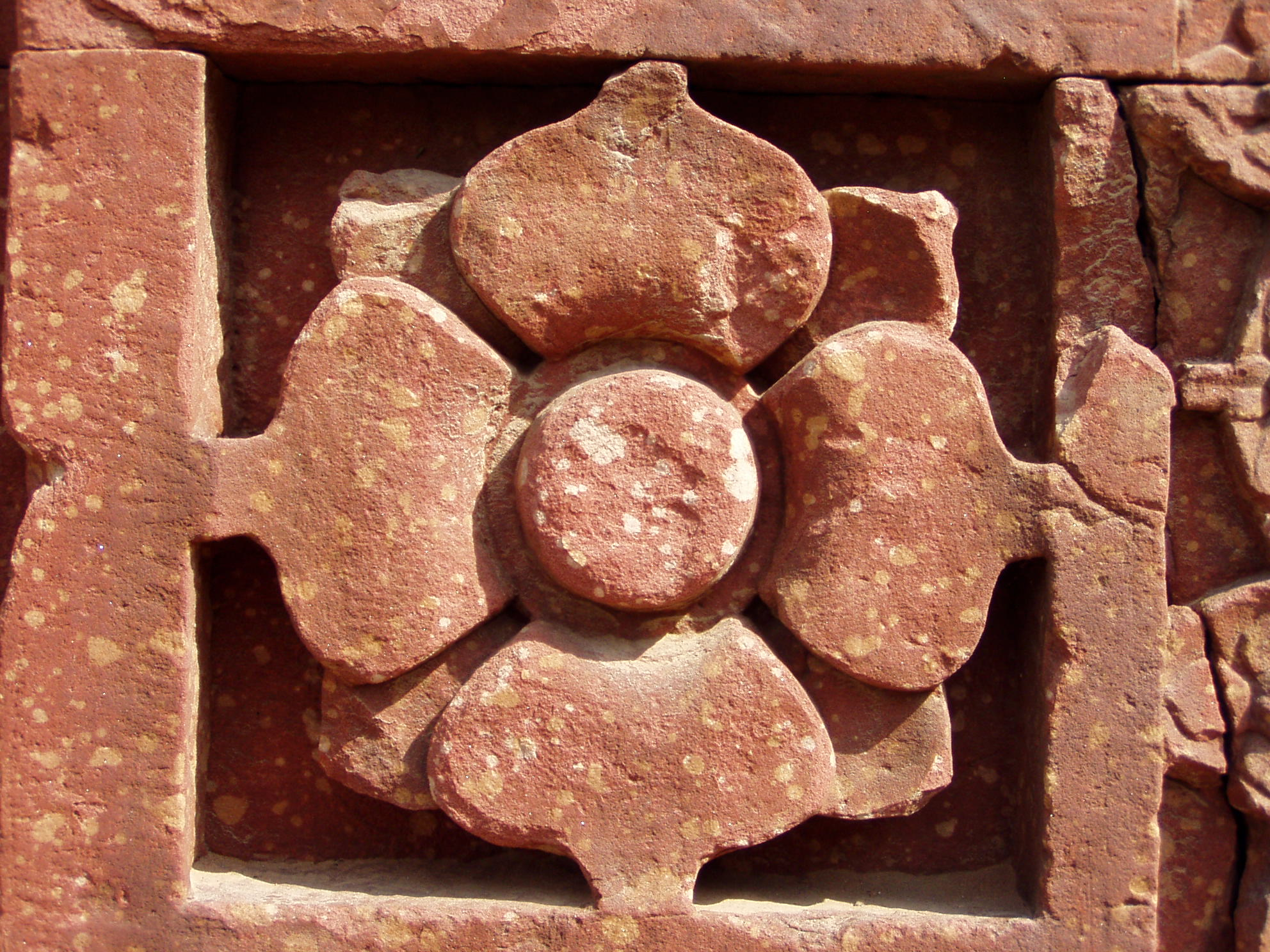
An Indian lotus motif on a Hindu temple

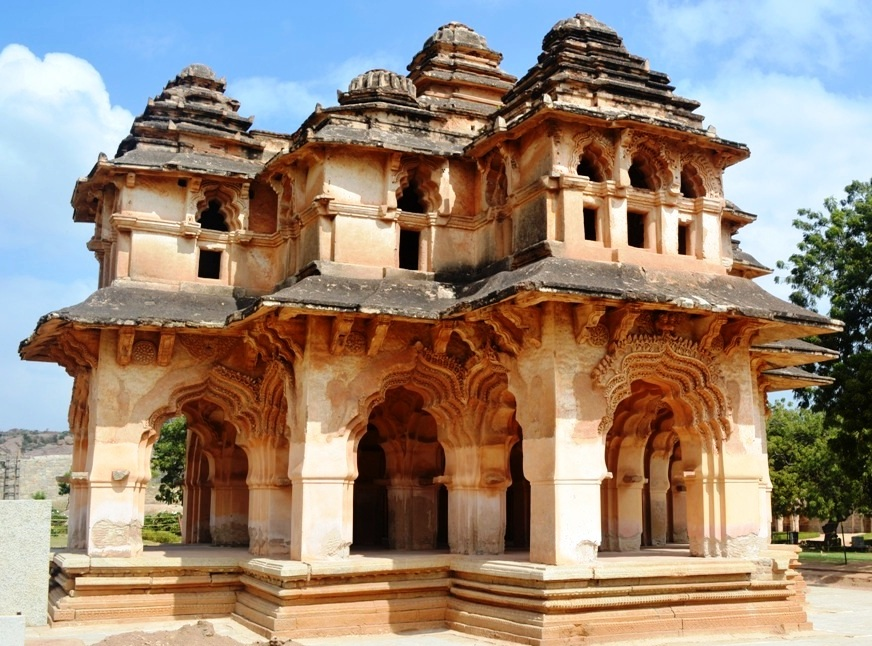
Lotus Mahal at Hampi

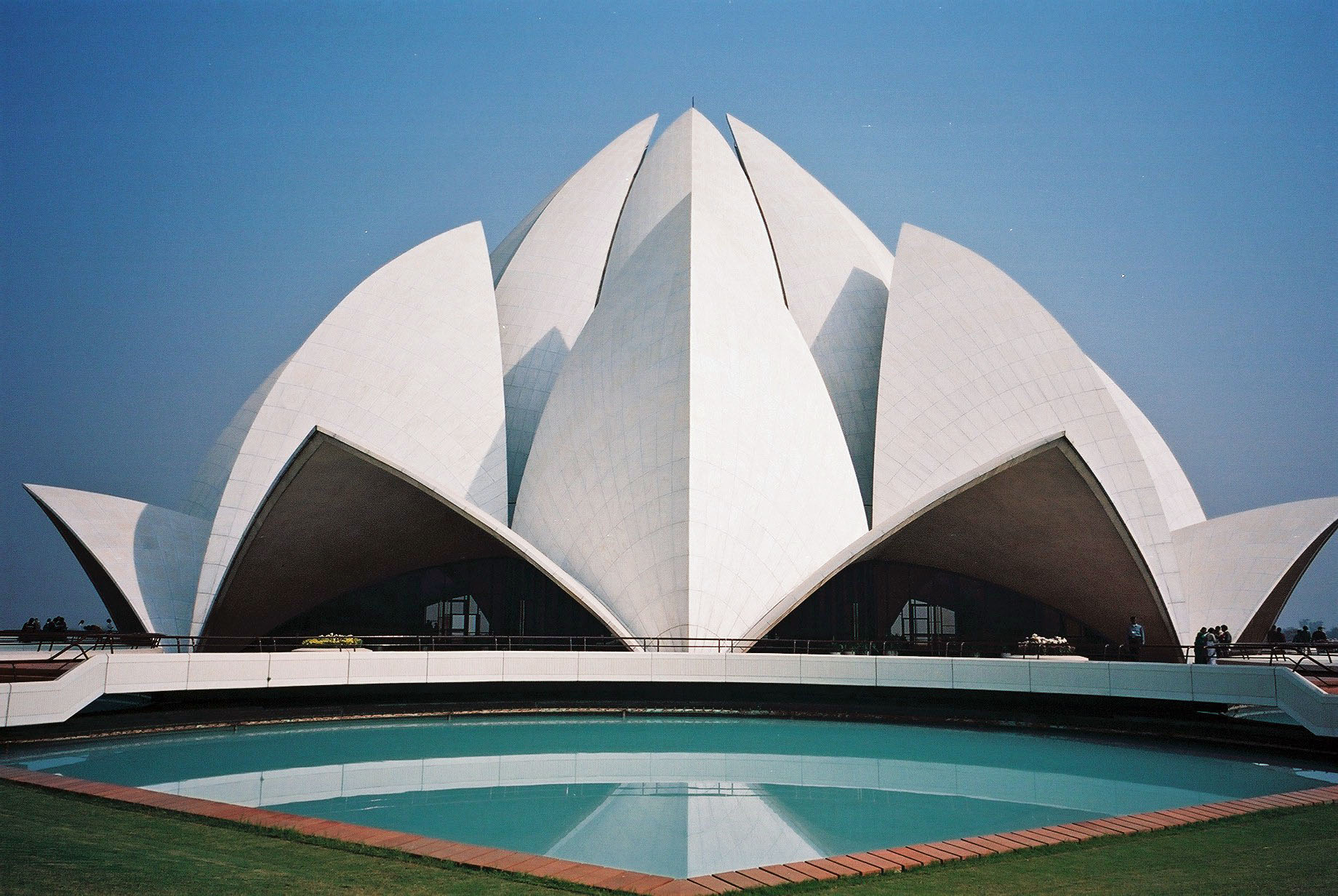
Lotus temple, Delhi

In Asian art, a lotus throne is a stylized lotus flower used as the seat or base for a figure in Buddhist art and Hindu art and is often seen in Jain art. Originating in Indian art, it followed Indian religions to East Asia in particular. Lotus flowers are also often held by figures.

Lotus symbol in Derafsh Kaviani, flag of the Sasanian Empire

The Nelumbo nucifera, which is also called Nilufar Abi in Persian, can be seen in many reliefs of the Achaemenid period (552 BC) such as the statue of Anahita in the Persepolis. The lotus flower was included in Kaveh the blacksmith's Derafsh and later as the flag of the Sasanian Empire Derafsh Kaviani. Today, it is the symbol of the Iranian Solar Hijri calendar.

The lotus flower is also mentioned in the Bible. The lotus flower also holds cultural and religious significance in Ismaili Muslim and related South Asian traditions. For example, in South Asian Ismaili literature, the lotus is compared to the pure soul. A poem describes the lotus' beauty, describing how its delicate white petals remain pure and beautiful, despite its murky environment. Similarly, a pure soul is part of this world, yet is not of this world, much like the circumstances of the lotus. The poem further emphasizes the importance of true knowledge or gnosis, which is likened to the pure rainwater that allows the lotus to flourish. Ismaili belief holds that the true guide provides this true knowledge, without which the pure soul cannot survive. Just as the lotus flower would rather die than drink from a reeking swamp, the pure soul also seeks nourishment solely through true knowledge.

In Chinese culture, the lotus is known as "Liánhuā" (蓮花) and holds important cultural significance in Chinese Buddhism, symbolizing purity, enlightenment, and the unfolding of the spiritual self. In Neo-Confucianism, the lotus is regarded as a symbol of Junzi or noble character, according to the Song dynasty scholar Zhou Dunyi.

=== Political symbols ===
The lotus is the national flower of the Republic of India. The Bharatiya Janata Party (BJP) uses lotus as its party symbol. The BJP, in the past, have used lotuses in multiple colours of pink, white, blue, red and saffron, in their party flag. In recent times, as a part of branding strategy and to make it easier for voters, BJP started using lotus logo in black-and-white in most settings as Electronic Voting Machines (EVM) in India only allow black-and-white logos.

Albeit unofficially, the lotus is also widely recognized as a national flower and a significant component representing the Vietnamese culture and national identity. The lotus and its stylized symbolism have been used by almost every modern Vietnamese governments and regimes including both the communist and non-communist ones. There are advocates for the contemporary Government of Vietnam to formally designate lotus as the national flower, citing straw polls indicating very high approval from the Vietnamese citizens.

Emblem of the Vietnam Fatherland Front

Emblem of the Vietnam Buddhist Sangha

Emblem of Hà Tĩnh city

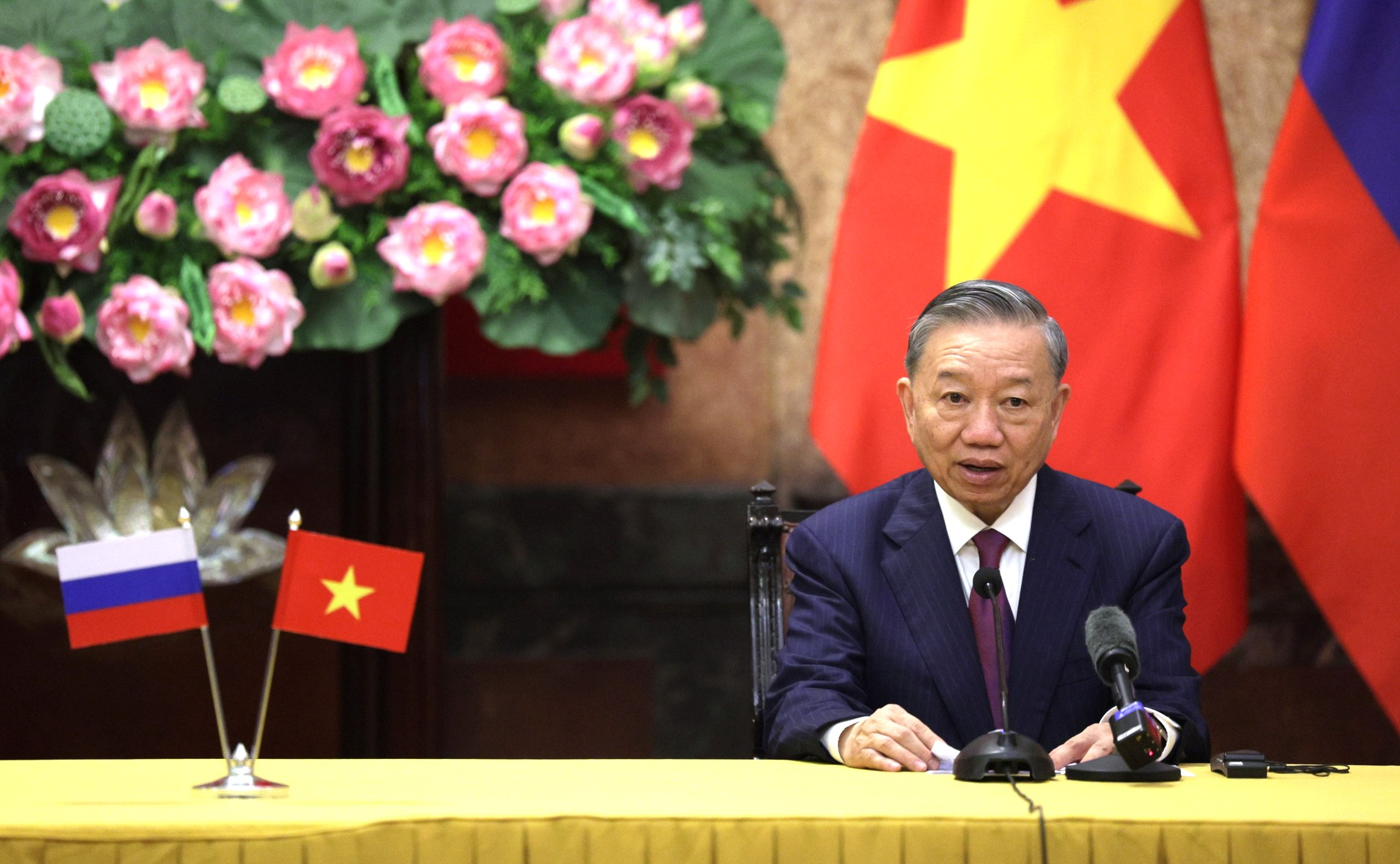
General Secretary Tô Lâm with lotus decorations behind him.

== See also ==
- Lotus silk
- Bingdi lotus
- List of vegetables
- The Lotos-Eaters
- Lotus
- Lotus position
- Lotus-eaters
- Palmette
- Tulsi
