= Berbamunine synthase =

berbamunine synthase

Identifiers
- EC no.: 1.14.19.66
- CAS no.: 144941-42-4

Databases
- IntEnz: IntEnz view
- BRENDA: BRENDA entry
- ExPASy: NiceZyme view
- KEGG: KEGG entry
- MetaCyc: metabolic pathway
- PRIAM: profile
- PDB structures: RCSB PDB PDBe PDBsum
- Gene Ontology: AmiGO / QuickGO
Search
- PMC: articles
- PubMed: articles
- NCBI: proteins

In enzymology, berbamunine synthase (EC 1.14.19.66, Formerly EC 1.1.3.34 and EC 1.14.21.3) is an enzyme that catalyzes the combination of two benzylisoquinoline alkaloids

(S)-N-methylcoclaurine
+
(R)-N-methylcoclaurine
O_{2}
2 H_{2}O
berbamunine

The enzyme has a cofactor, a reduced nicotinamide adenine dinucleotide phosphate in combination with a hemoprotein, which allows it to use molecular oxygen to oxidatively combine the alkaloid substrates.

It can combine related alkaloids differing only in the degree of methylation of the phenolic oxygens. For example, (S)-coclaurine also reacts with (R)-N-methylcoclaurine to give 2'-norberbamunine and dimerisation of (R)-N-methylcoclaurine gives guattegaumerine.

coclaurine
+
(R)-N-methylcoclaurine
O_{2}
2 H_{2}O
2'-norberbamunine

The enzyme belongs to the family of oxidoreductases and its systematic name is (S)-N-methylcoclaurine,NADPH:oxygen oxidoreductase (C-O phenol-coupling). It is also called (S)-N-methylcoclaurine oxidase (C-O phenol-coupling). It was first isolated from Berberis stolonifera and participates in alkaloid biosynthesis.
