= Cepharanthine =

Chemical compound

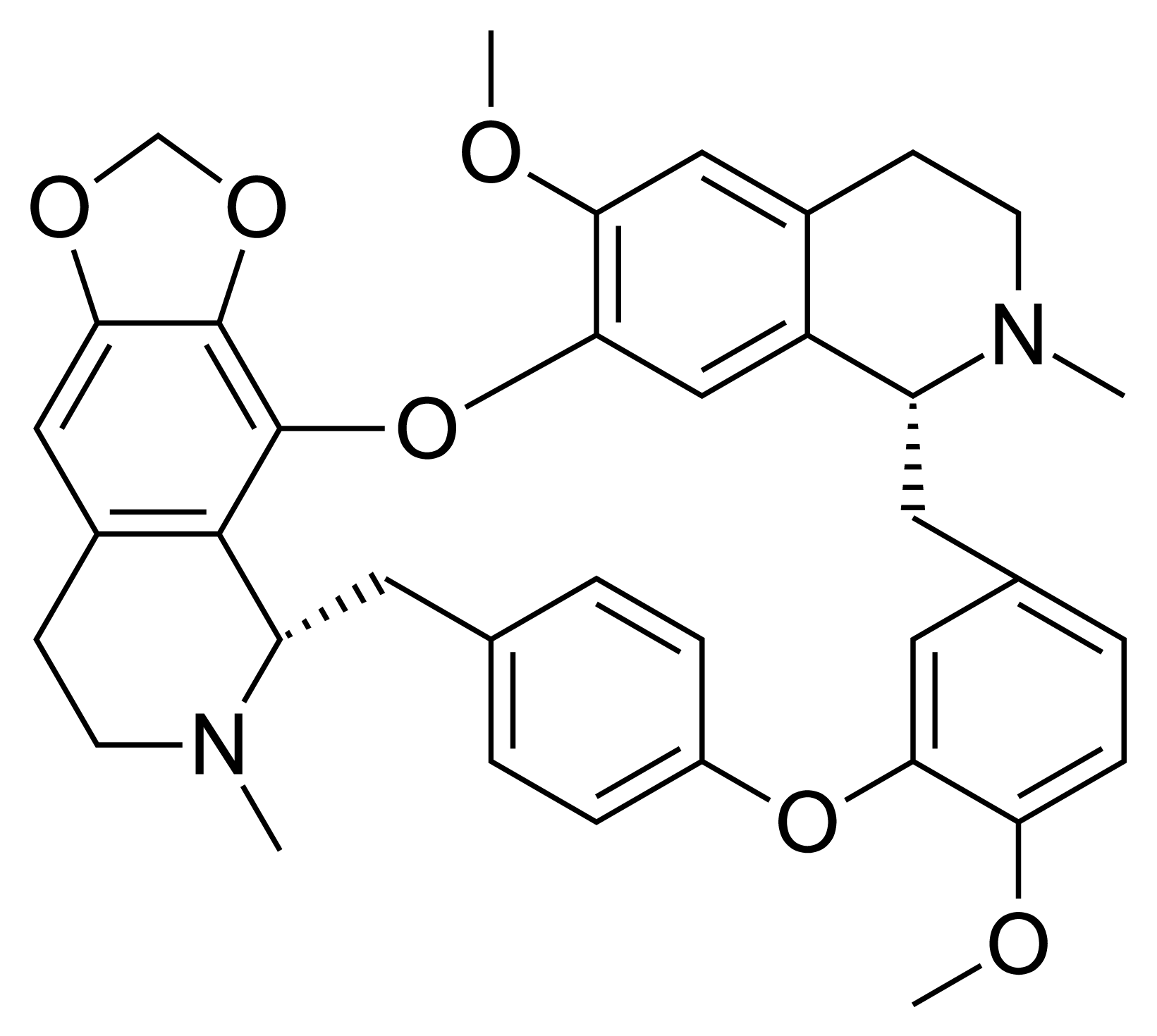

Clinical data
- Other names: Cepharantin, O-Methylcepharanoline
- AHFS/Drugs.com: International Drug Names
- ATC code: none

Identifiers
- IUPAC name: (14S,27R)-22,33-dimethoxy-13,28-dimethyl-2,5,7,20-tetraoxa-13,28-diazaoctacyclo[25.6.2.2^{16,19}.1^{3,10}.1^{21,25}.0^{4,8}.0^{31,35}.0^{14,39}]nonatriaconta-1(33),3(39),4(8),9,16(38),17,19(37),21,23,25(36),31,34-dodecaene
- CAS Number: 481-49-2
- PubChem CID: 10206
- ChemSpider: 9791
- UNII: 7592YJ0J6T
- ChEMBL: ChEMBL449782
- CompTox Dashboard (EPA): DTXSID6045957
- ECHA InfoCard: 100.208.632

Chemical and physical data
- Formula: C_{37}H_{38}N_{2}O_{6}
- Molar mass: 606.719 g·mol^{−1}
- 3D model (JSmol): Interactive image
- SMILES: CN1CCC2=CC3=C(C4=C2[C@@H]1CC5=CC=C(C=C5)OC6=C(C=CC(=C6)C[C@@H]7C8=CC(=C(C=C8CCN7C)OC)O4)OC)OCO3
- InChI: InChI=1S/C37H38N2O6/c1-38-13-11-24-18-31(41-4)33-20-27(24)28(38)16-23-7-10-30(40-3)32(17-23)44-26-8-5-22(6-9-26)15-29-35-25(12-14-39(29)2)19-34-36(37(35)45-33)43-21-42-34/h5-10,17-20,28-29H,11-16,21H2,1-4H3/t28-,29+/m1/s1; Key:YVPXVXANRNDGTA-WDYNHAJCSA-N

Cepharanthine is an antiinflammatory and antineoplastic compound isolated from Stephania. Due to these modalities, it has been shown effective against viral infections such as HTLV and hantavirus in early stage research. Additionally, it has successfully been used to treat a diverse range of medical conditions, including radiation-induced leukopenia, idiopathic thrombocytopenic purpura, alopecia areata, alopecia pityrodes, venomous snakebites, xerostomia, sarcoidosis, refractory anemia and various cancer-related conditions. No safety issues have been observed with CEP, and side effects are very rarely reported.
