= Maehwa-cha =

Korean tea

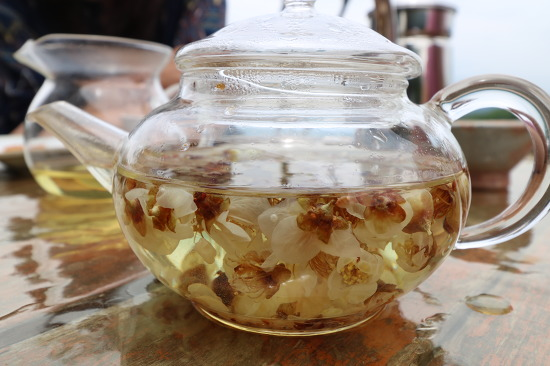
- Type: Tea
- Origin: Korea
- Ingredients: Plum flowers

Korean name
- Hangul: 매화차
- Hanja: 梅花茶
- RR: maehwacha
- MR: maehwach'a
- IPA: [mɛ.ɦwa.tɕʰa]

Maehwa-cha (Korean: 매화차; Hanja: 梅花茶) or plum blossom tea is a Korean tea made by infusing dried flowers of Chinese plum in hot water. During the early spring, half-open buds of plum blossoms are picked, dried, and preserved in honey. It is served with ten flowers in a teapot and by pouring 50 ml (1.7 US fl oz) of hot water. The tea is drunk after one to two minutes of steeping.

== Gallery ==
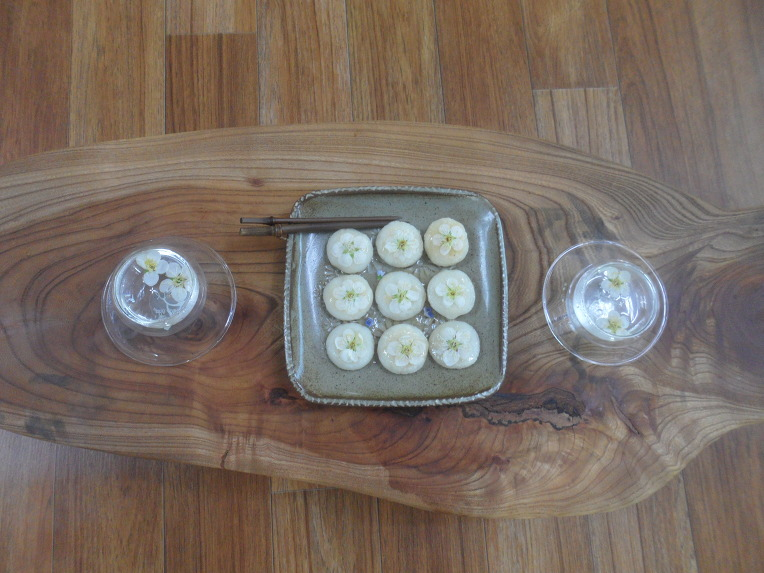
Maehwa-cha (plum blossom tea) drunk with hwajeon (flower pancakes)

== See also ==
- Maesil-cha, Korean plum tea
- Suānméitāng, Chinese sour plum drink
