= Maesil-cha =

Korean plum tea

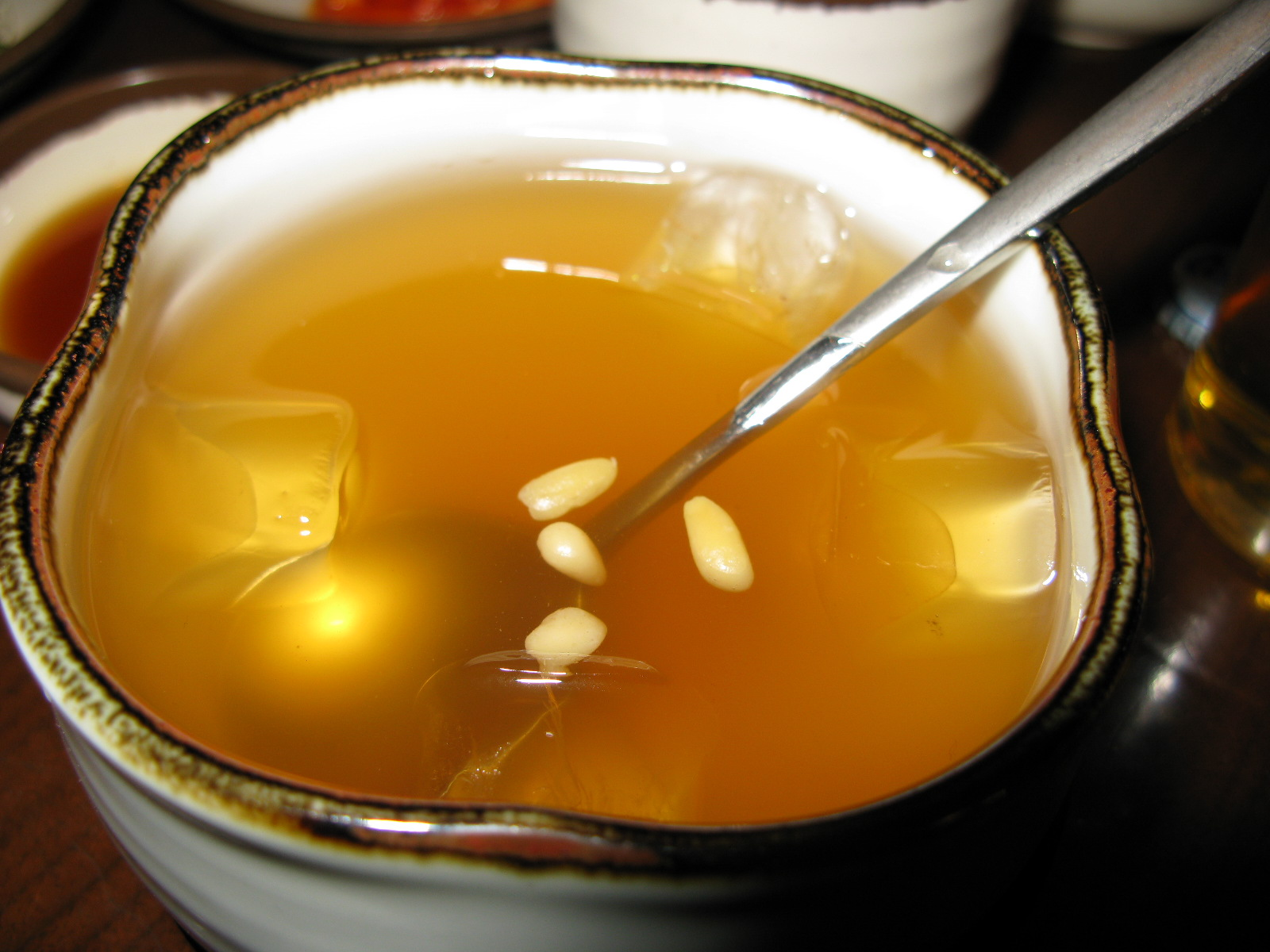
- Cold maesil-cha (plum tea) with pine nuts
- Type: Herbal tea
- Origin: Korea
- Ingredients: Maesil (plums), maesil-cheong (plum syrup), or omae (smoked plums)

Korean name
- Hangul: 매실차
- Hanja: 梅實茶
- RR: maesilcha
- MR: maesilch'a
- IPA: [mɛ.ɕil.tɕʰa]

Maesil-cha (Korean: 매실차) or plum tea is a traditional Korean tea made from maesil (fresh plums), omae (smoked plums), or maesil-cheong (plum syrup).

== Preparation ==
Most commonly, maesil-cha is made by mixing maesil-cheong (plum syrup) with hot or cold water.

Sometimes, plum tea is made with plum extract, made by grating green plums, mixing it with small amount of water and juicing through hemp cloth, and sun-drying it. The extract is kept in a glass container in a cool area, and mixed with hot water to make tea.

Plum tea made with smoked plums are usually called omae-cha ("smoked plum tea").

== See also ==
- Maehwa-cha – plum blossom tea
- Maesil-ju – plum wine
- Suānméitāng – Chinese sour plum drink
