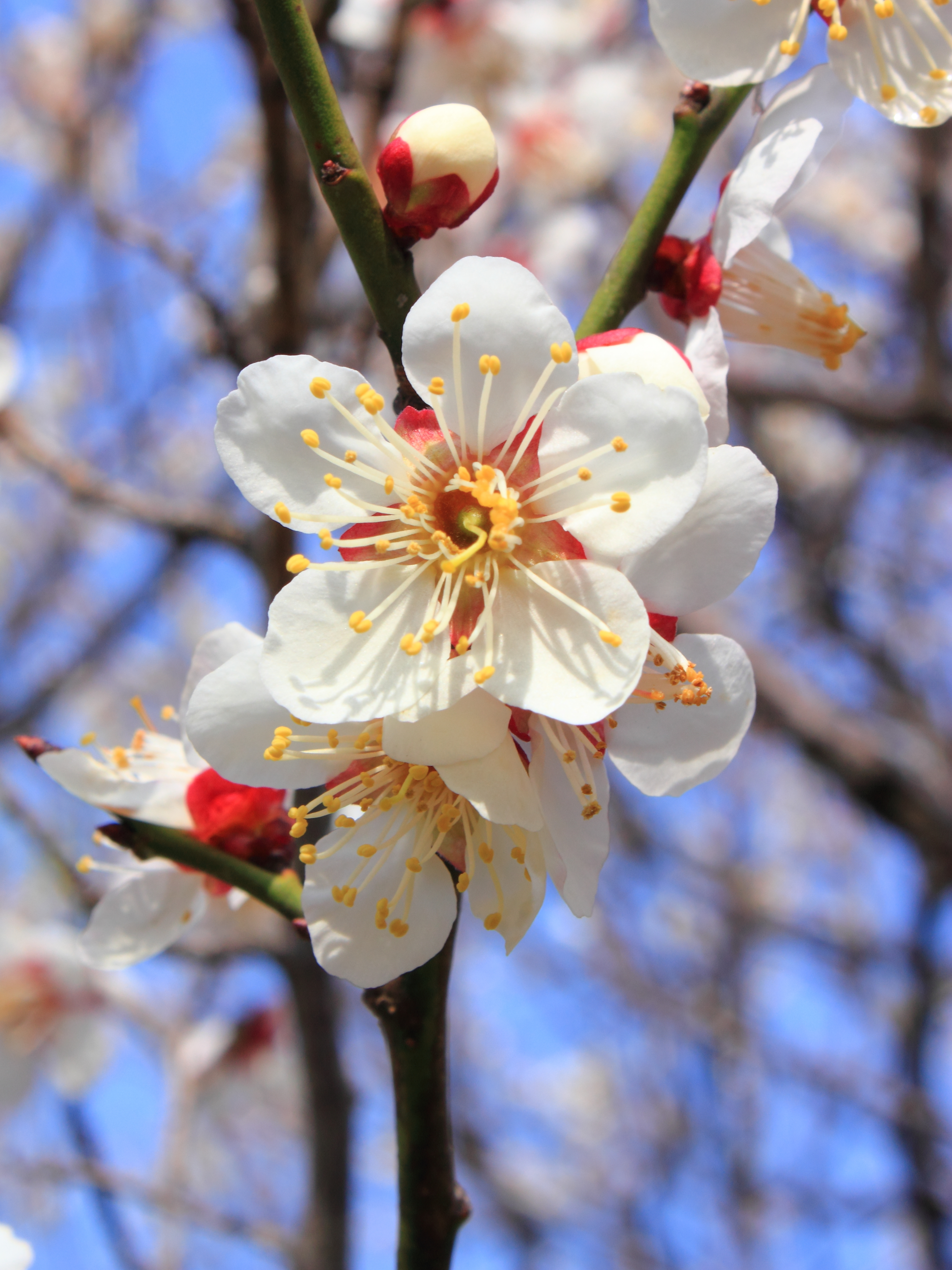

Conservation status
- Least Concern (IUCN 3.1)

Scientific classification
- Kingdom: Plantae
- Clade: Tracheophytes
- Clade: Angiosperms
- Clade: Eudicots
- Clade: Rosids
- Order: Rosales
- Family: Rosaceae
- Genus: Prunus
- Subgenus: Prunus subg. Prunus
- Section: Prunus sect. Armeniaca
- Species: P. mume

Binomial name
- Prunus mume (Siebold) Siebold & Zucc.

Synonyms
- List: Armeniaca mume Siebold; Armeniaca mume var. alba Carrière; Armeniaca mume var. alphandii Carrière; Armeniaca mume var. pubicaulina C. Z. Qiao & H. M. Shen; Armeniaca mume f. pendula (Siebold) H. Ohba & S. Akiyama; Prunopsis mume (Siebold) André; Prunus makinoensis Lév.; Prunus mume formosana Masam. ex Kudô & Masam.; Prunus mume microcarpa Makino; Prunus mume var. alboplena L. H. Bailey; Prunus mume var. laciniata Maxim.; Prunus mume var. pendula Siebold; Prunus mume var. rosea Ingram; Prunus mume var. tonsa Rehder; Prunus mume f. alba (Carrière) Rehder; Prunus mume f. alboplena (L. H. Bailey) Rehder; Prunus mume f. alphandii (Carrière) Rehder

= Prunus mume =

East Asian tree species

Prunus mume, known by the common name Chinese plum (which also applies to P. salicina), is a species of tree in the rose family. It is also referenced by its flowers as plum blossom. Despite being referred to as a plum, it is classified in the Armeniaca section of Prunus, making it an apricot.

The plant was introduced from China to Korea, Vietnam, and Japan. The flowers are appreciated for their characteristic fragrance. In East Asian cuisine (Chinese, Japanese, Korean, and Vietnamese), the fruit is used in juices and sauces, as a flavoring for alcohol, and may be pickled or dried. It is also used in traditional Chinese medicine.

Mei flowers, or meihua (梅花), which bloom in the late winter and early spring, notably during the spring festival (春節), symbolize endurance, as they are the first to bloom despite the cold; the flower is one of the Three Friends of Winter. The plant is of high cultural importance to China.

== Description ==
Prunus mume is a deciduous tree that starts to flower in mid-winter, typically around January until late February in East Asia. It can grow to 4–10 m (13–33 ft) tall. The flowers are 2–2.5 cm (0.79–0.98 in) in diameter and have a strong fragrant scent. They have colors in varying shades of white, pink, and red. The leaves appear shortly after the petals fall, are oval-shaped with a pointed tip, and are 4–8 cm long and 2.5–5 cm wide.

The fruit ripens in early summer, around June and July in East Asia, and coincides with the East Asian rainy season, the meiyu (梅雨, "plum rain"). The drupe is 2–3 cm (0.79–1.18 in) in diameter with a groove running from the stalk to the tip. The skin turns yellow, sometimes with a red blush, as it ripens, and the flesh becomes yellow. The tree is cultivated for its fruit and flowers.

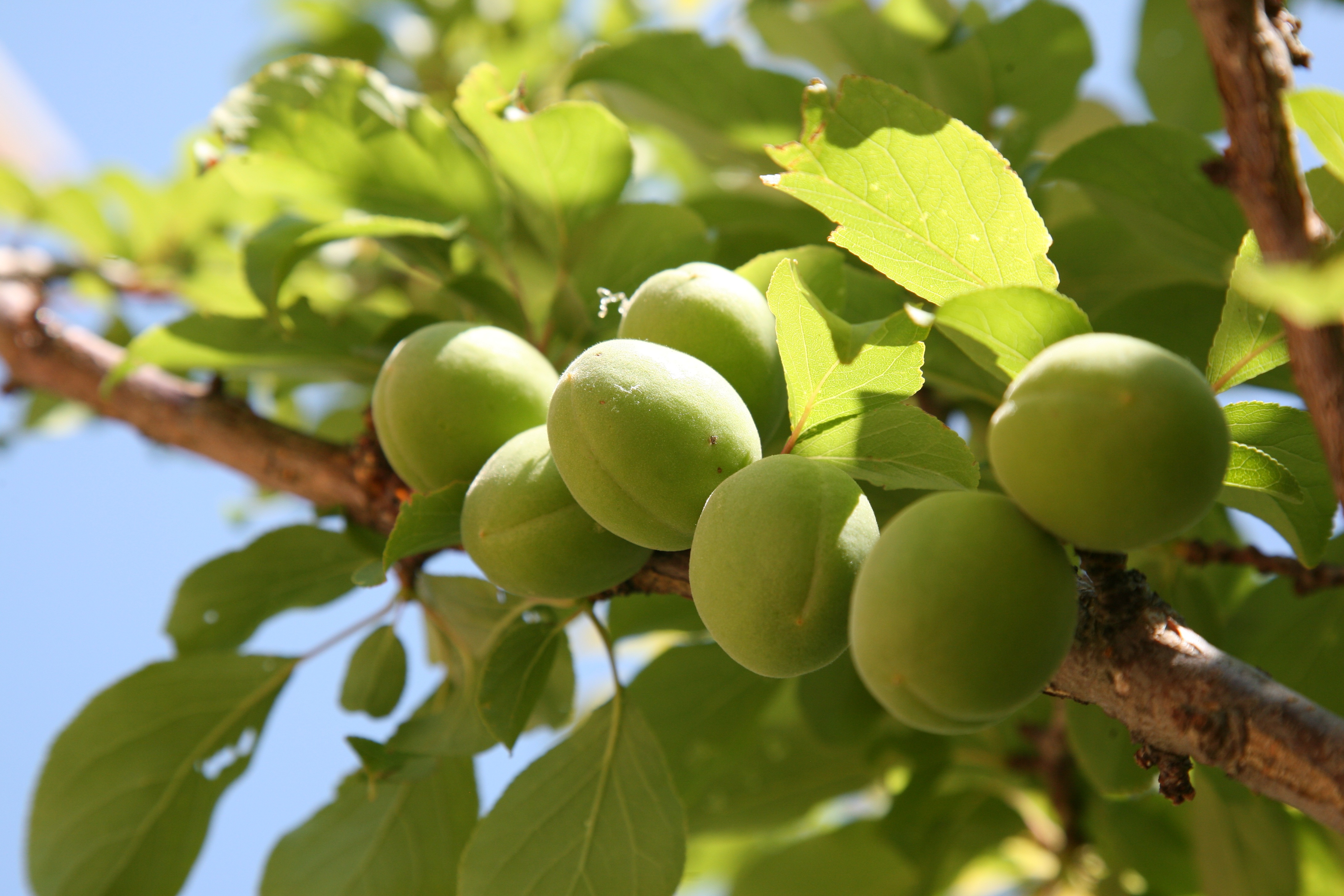
Unripe fruit

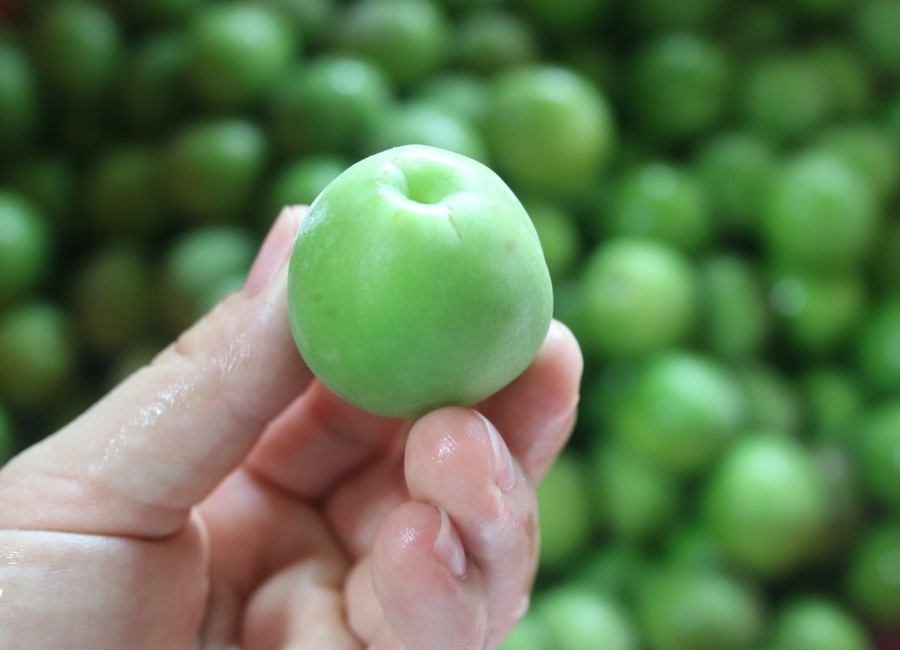
Washed and stemmed fruit

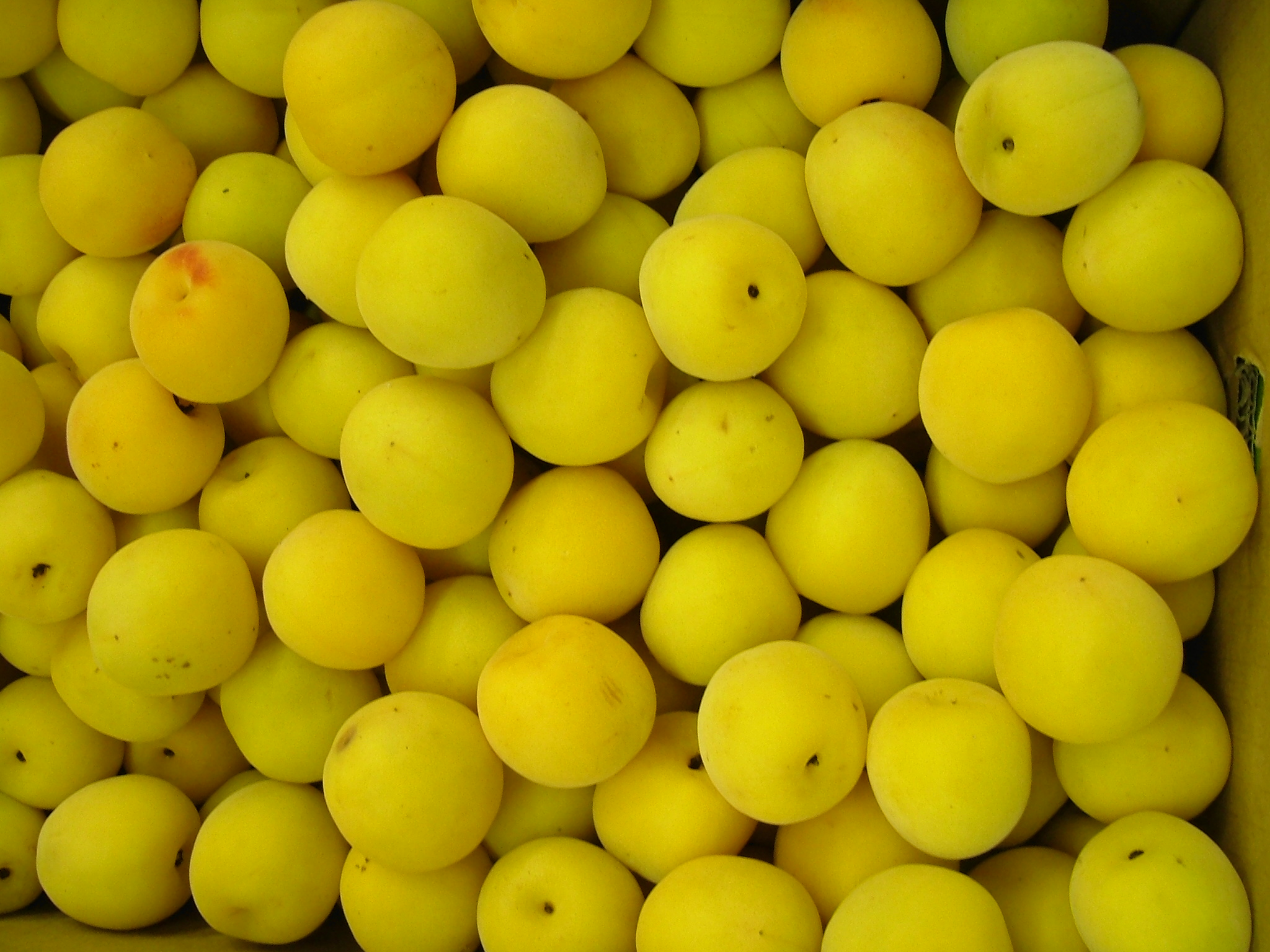
Ripe fruit

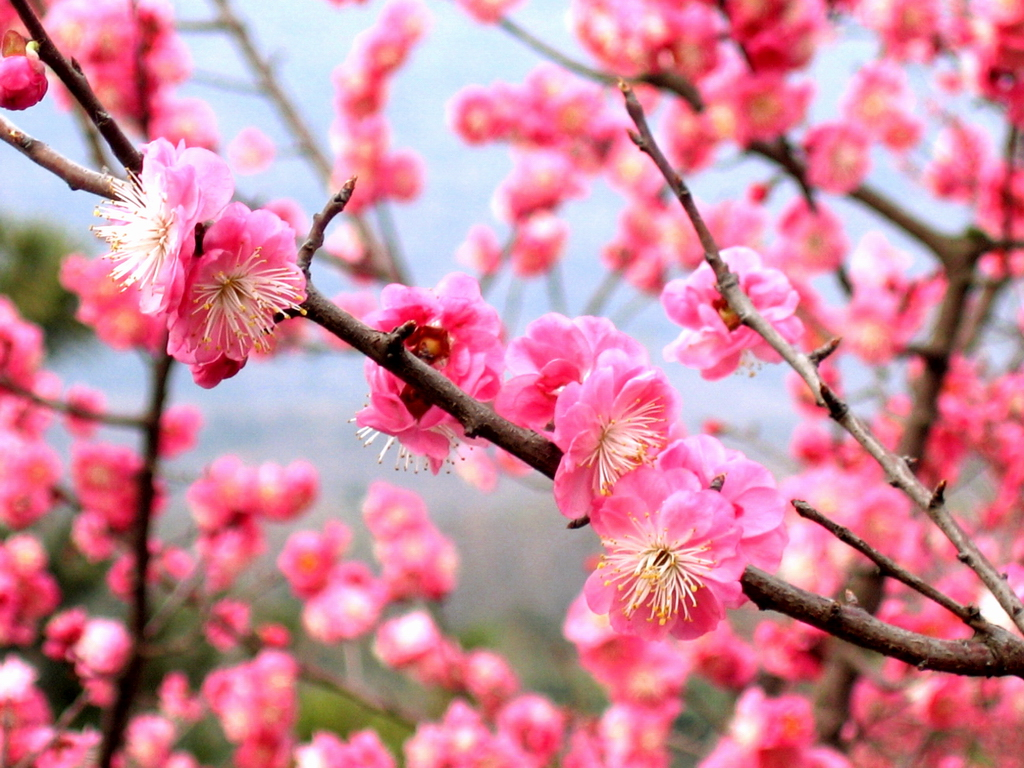
Plum blossoms

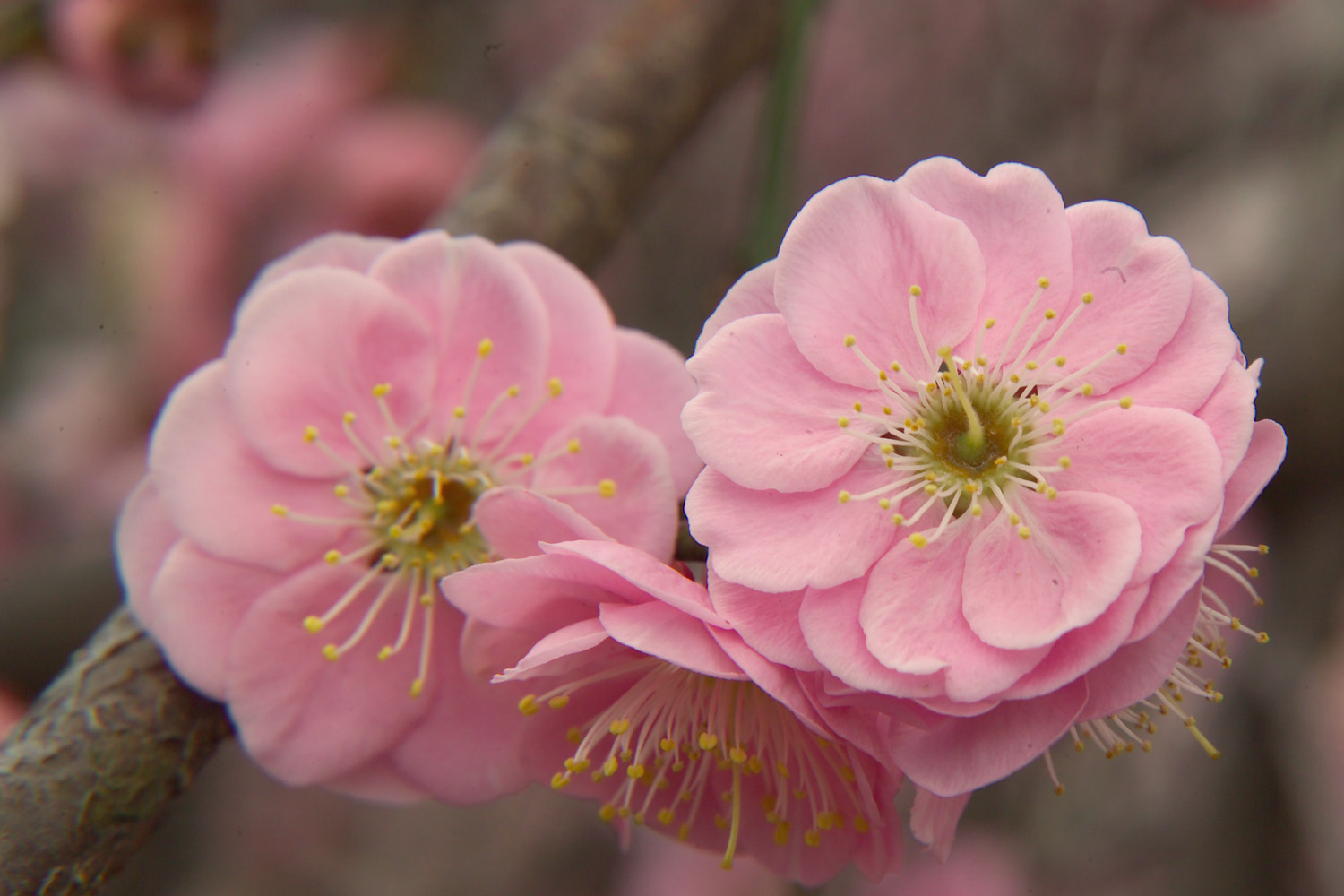
Plum blossoms

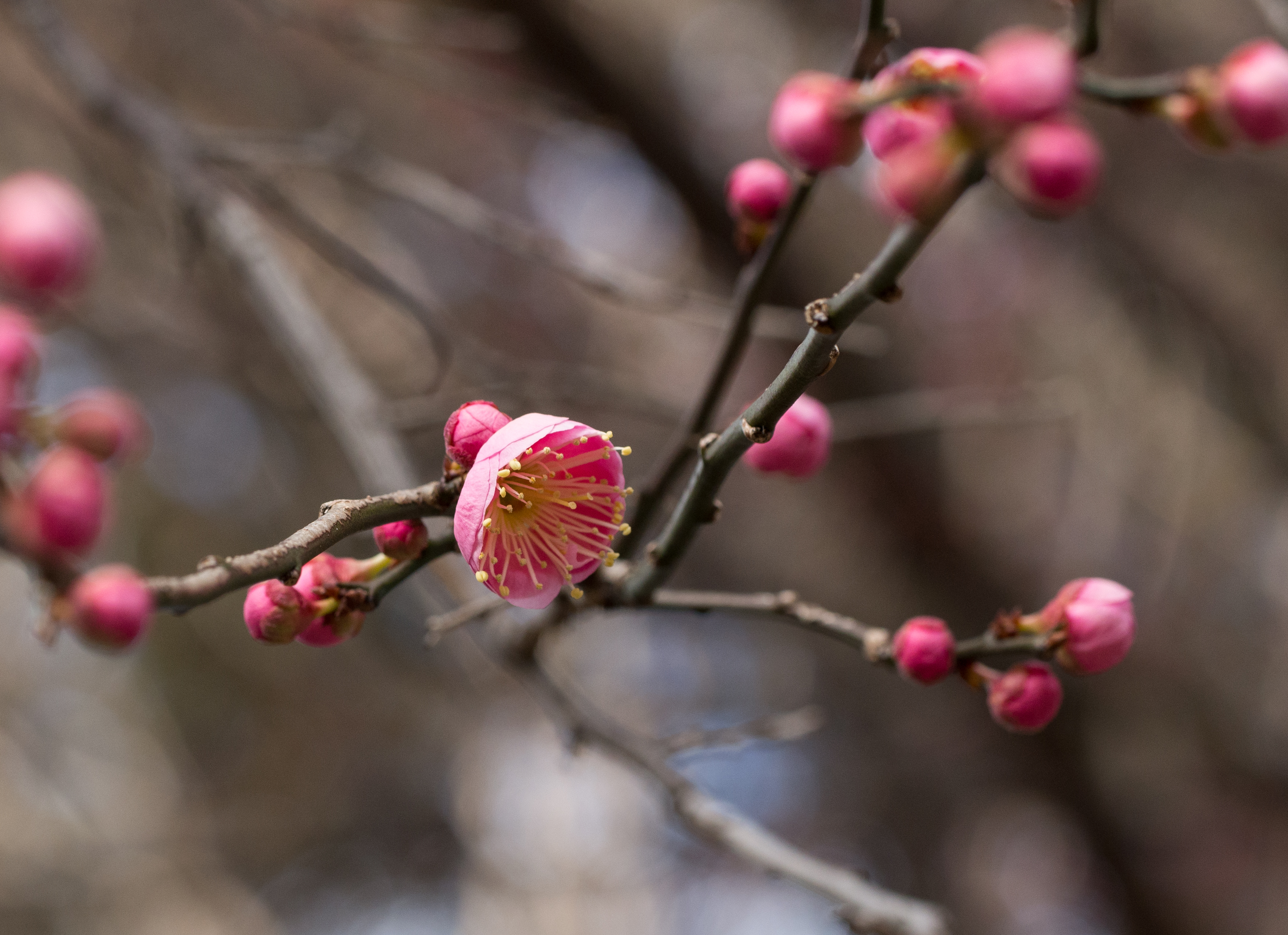
"Peggy Clarke" plum blossoms

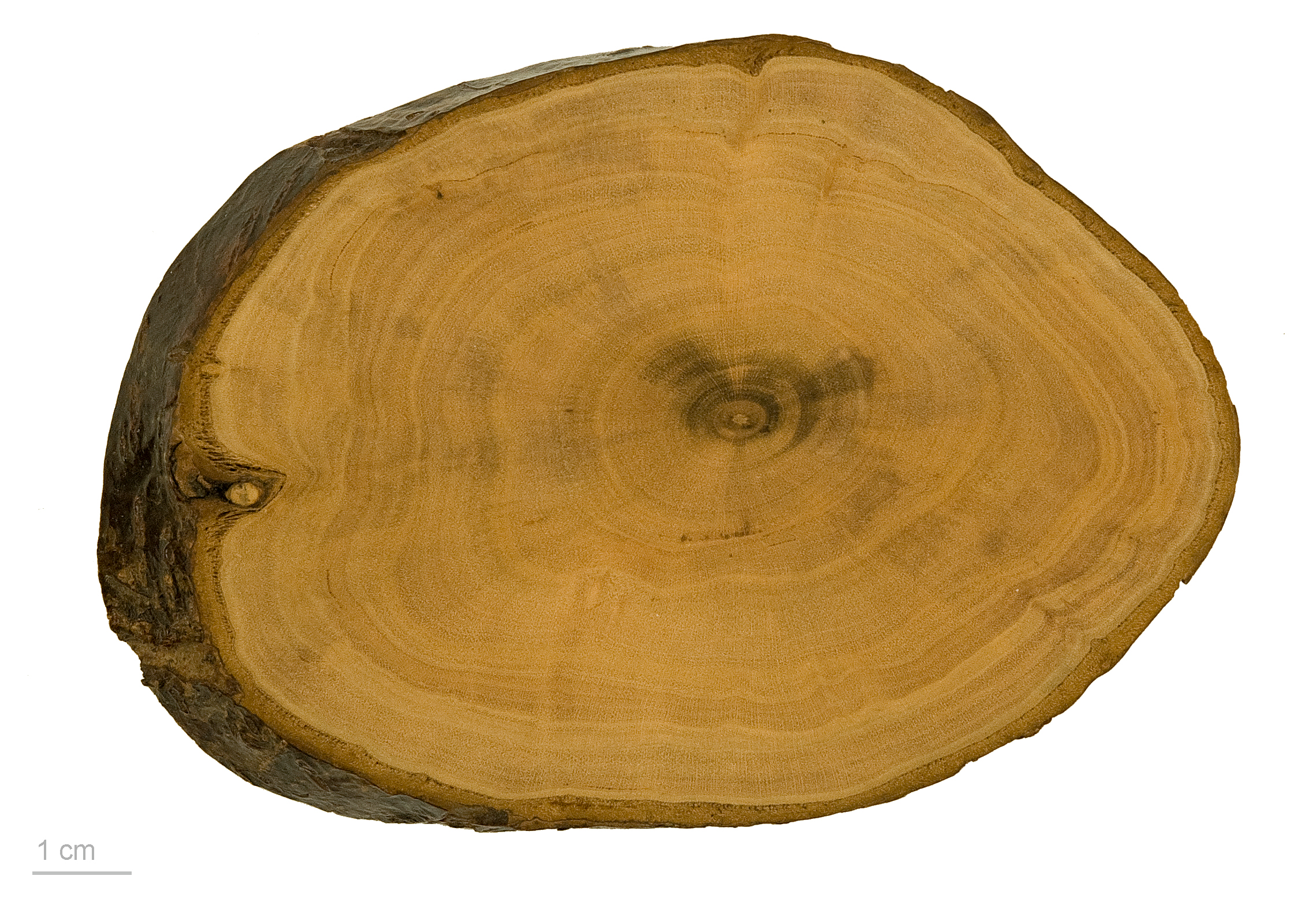
Trunk cross section

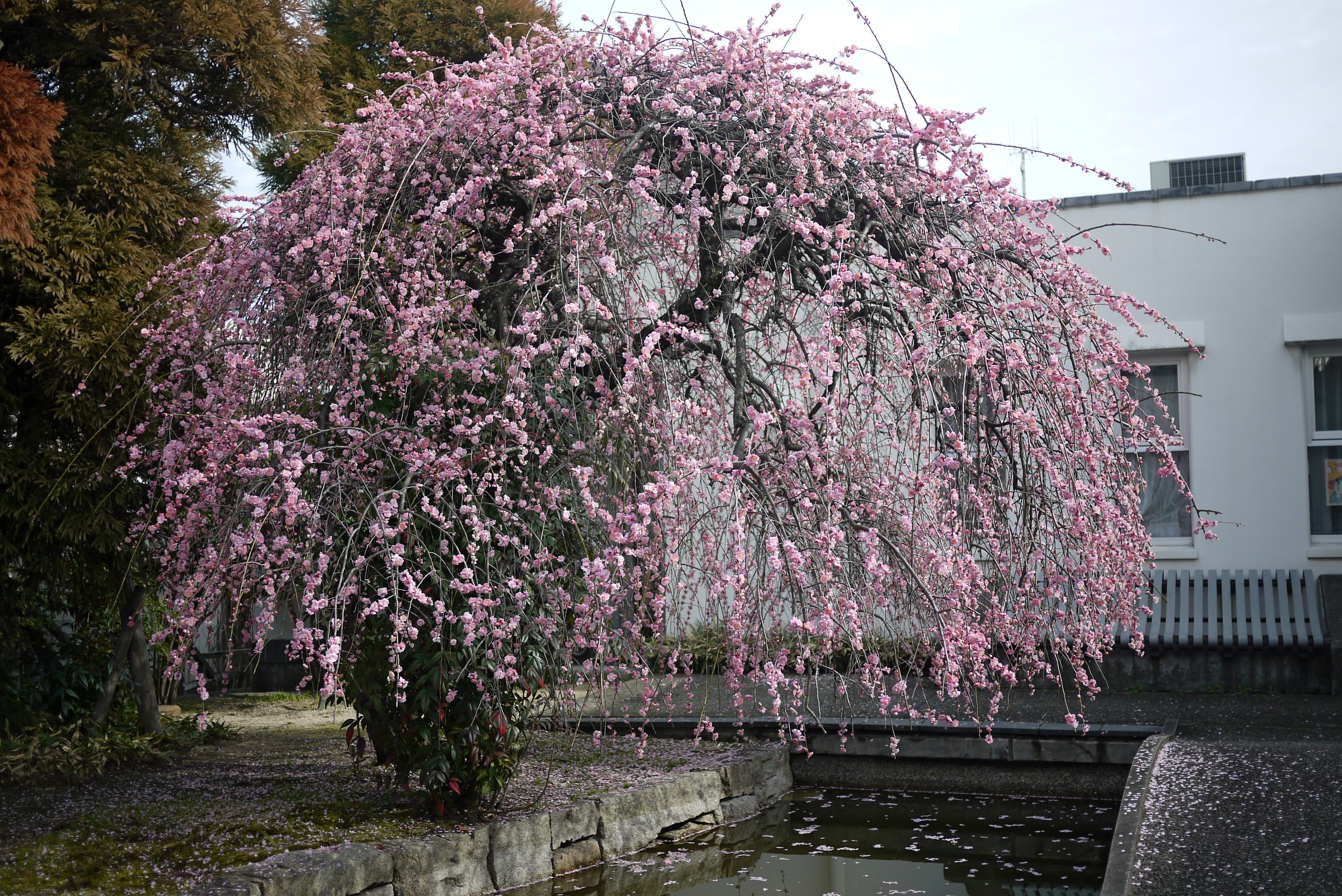
Weeping tree cultivar

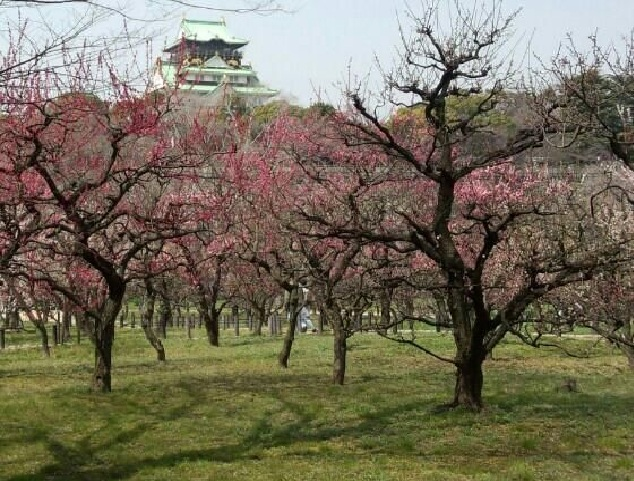
A grove of trees

=== Similar species ===
The common apricot, Prunus armeniaca, is closely related under the same section.

== Names ==
Plum

Chinese name
- Chinese: 梅
Transcriptions
Standard Mandarin
- Hanyu Pinyin: méi
- Bopomofo: ㄇㄟˊ
Wu
- Wugniu: me^{2}
Yue: Cantonese
- Yale Romanization: mùih
- Jyutping: mui^{4}
Southern Min
- Hokkien POJ: mûi
- Teochew Peng'im: bhuê^{5}

Alternative Chinese name
- Chinese: 梅花
Transcriptions
Standard Mandarin
- Hanyu Pinyin: méihuā
- Bopomofo: ㄇㄟˊ ㄏㄨㄚ
Wu
- Wugniu: me^{2} ho^{1}
Yue: Cantonese
- Yale Romanization: mùih fā
- Jyutping: mui^{4} faa^{1}
Southern Min
- Hokkien POJ: mûi-hoe
- Teochew Peng'im: bhuê^{5} huê^{1}

Vietnamese name
- Vietnamese: mai

Korean name
- Hangul: 매실
- Hanja: 梅實
Transcriptions
- Revised Romanization: maesil

Alternative Korean name
- Hangul: 매화
- Hanja: 梅花
Transcriptions
- Revised Romanization: maehwa

Japanese name
- Kanji: 梅
- Kana: うめ
Transcriptions
- Romanization: ume

Alternative Japanese name
- Kanji: 梅花
- Kana: ばいか
Transcriptions
- Romanization: baika

Native to southern China, where it is known as mei (梅). The scientific name combines the Latin prūnus ("(European) plum tree") and the obsolete Japanese pronunciation of 梅 (mume), which is ultimately likely derived from Middle Chinese. The plant is known by a number of different names in English, including flowering plum or plum blossoms. Another misnomer, Japanese apricot, likely derives from the plant's introduction into Western knowledge by Philipp Franz von Siebold, who encountered it while living in Japan.

The flower is known as the meihua (梅花) in Chinese, which came to be translated as "plum blossom" or sometimes as "flowering plum". The term "winter plum" may be used too, specifically with regard to the depiction of the flower with its early blooming in Chinese painting. The character 梅 is a phono-semantic compound created by combining the semantic component 木 ("tree") with the phonetic component 每 (literally meaning "every," pronounced /*mɯːʔ/ in Old Chinese, which was similar to /*mɯː/ for "plum").

== Origin and distribution ==
Prunus mume originated in the region around the Yangtze River in southern China and was cultivated domestically for both its ornamental beauty and its fruit. It was later introduced to Japan, Korea, and Vietnam. It can be found in sparse forests, stream sides, forested slopes along trails, and mountains, sometimes at altitudes up to 1,700–3,100 m (5,600–10,200 ft), and regions of cultivation.

== Varieties ==
Ornamental tree varieties and cultivars of P. mume have been cultivated for planting in various gardens throughout East Asia, and for cut blossoming branches used in flower arrangements. Some are valued for their floral fragrance, which is unique among apricots.

=== Chinese varieties ===
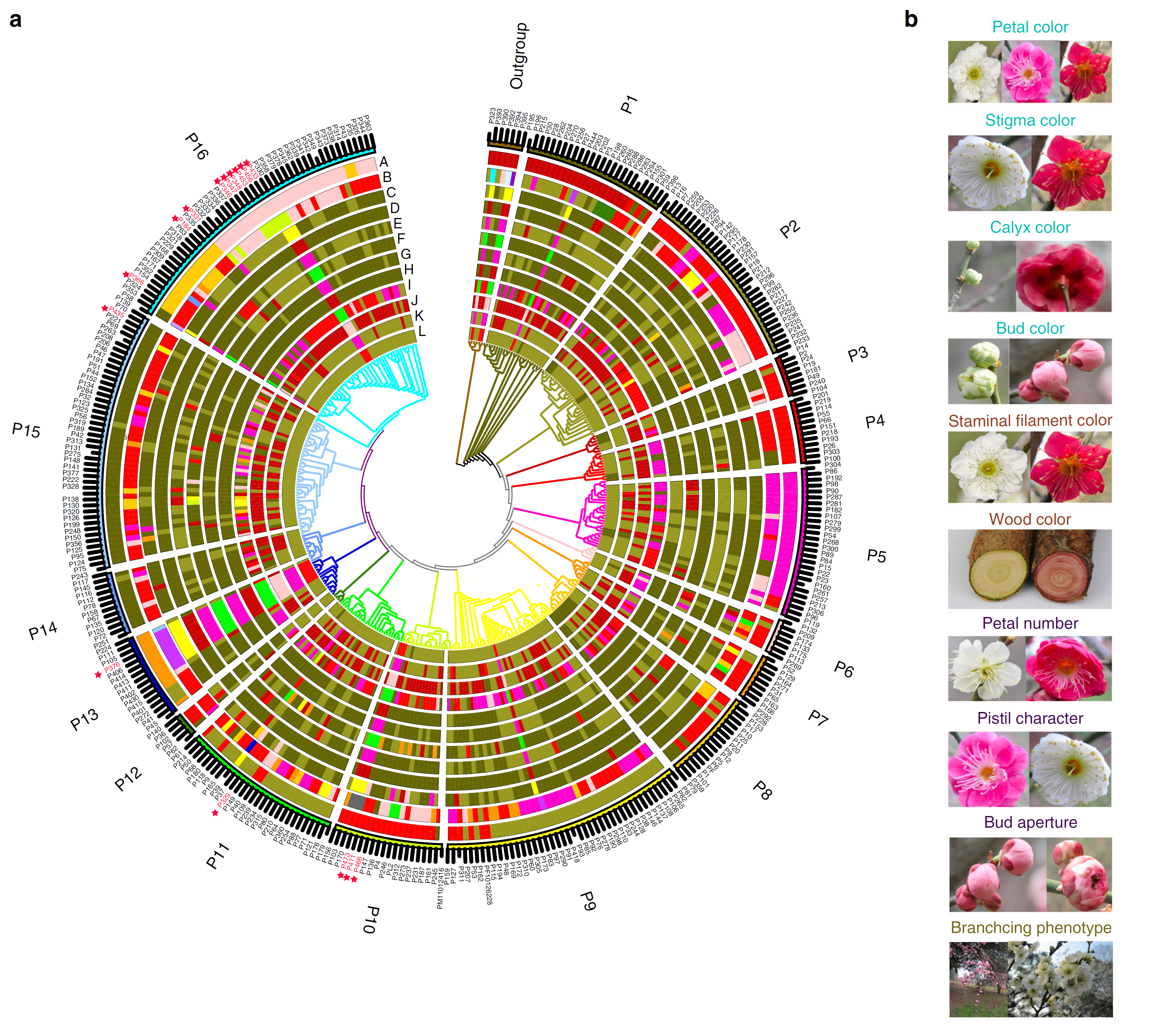
Phylogenetic tree and ten representative traits

In China, there are over 300 recorded cultivars of Prunus mume. These are classified by their phylogenetics (P. mume and hybrids) into branches, characteristics of their branches in groups, and characteristics of their flowers in forms:

- Upright Mei Group (直枝梅類), Prunus mume var. typica
  - Pleiocarpa Form (品字梅型)
  - Single Flowered Form (江梅型)
  - Pink Double Form (宮粉型)
  - Alboplena Form (玉蝶型)
  - Flavescens Form (黃香型)
  - Green Calyx Form (綠萼型)
  - Versicolor Form (灑金型)
  - Cinnabar Purple Form (硃砂型)
- Pendulous Mei Group (垂枝梅類), Prunus mume var. pendula
  - Pink Pendulous Form (粉花垂枝型)
  - Versicolor Pendulous Form (五寶垂枝型)
  - Albiflora Pendulous Form (殘雪垂枝型)
  - Viridiflora Pendulous Form (白碧垂枝型)
  - Atropurpurea Pendulous Form (骨紅垂枝型)
- Tortuous Dragon Group (龍游梅類), Prunus mume var. tortuosa
- Apricot Mei Group (杏梅類), Prunus mume var. bungo
- Blireiana Group (櫻李梅類), Prunus × blireana, Prunus cerasifera 'Pissardii' × Prunus mume Alphandii

It is disputed whether Prunus zhengheensis (Chinese: 政和杏) is a separate species or conspecific with Prunus mume. It is found in the Fujian province of China. It is only known from one county, Zhenghe. It is a tree that prefers to grow at 700–1,000 m (2,300–3,300 ft) above sea level. The yellow fruit is delectable and aside from its height, it is indistinguishable from P. mume.

=== Japanese varieties ===
In Japan, ornamental Prunus mume cultivars are classified into yabai (wild), hibai (red), and bungo (Bungo Province) types. The bungo trees are also grown for fruit and are hybrids between Prunus mume and apricot. The hibai trees have red heartwood and most of them have red flowers. The yabai trees are also used as grafting stock. Among yabai trees, Nankoume is a very popular variety in Japan, and whose fruits are mainly used for making umeboshi.

== Uses ==
=== Culinary use ===
==== Beverage ====
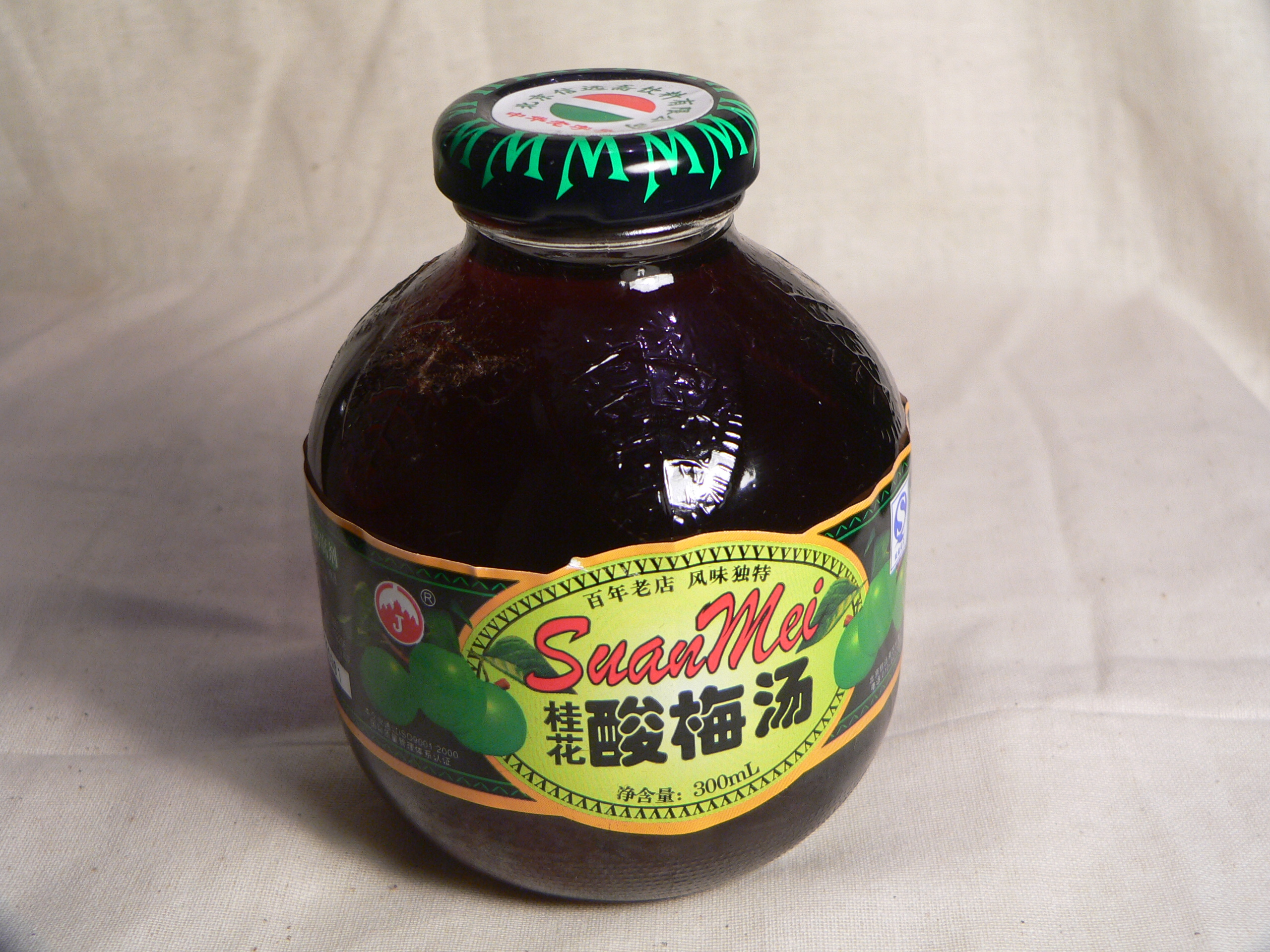
Suanmeitang

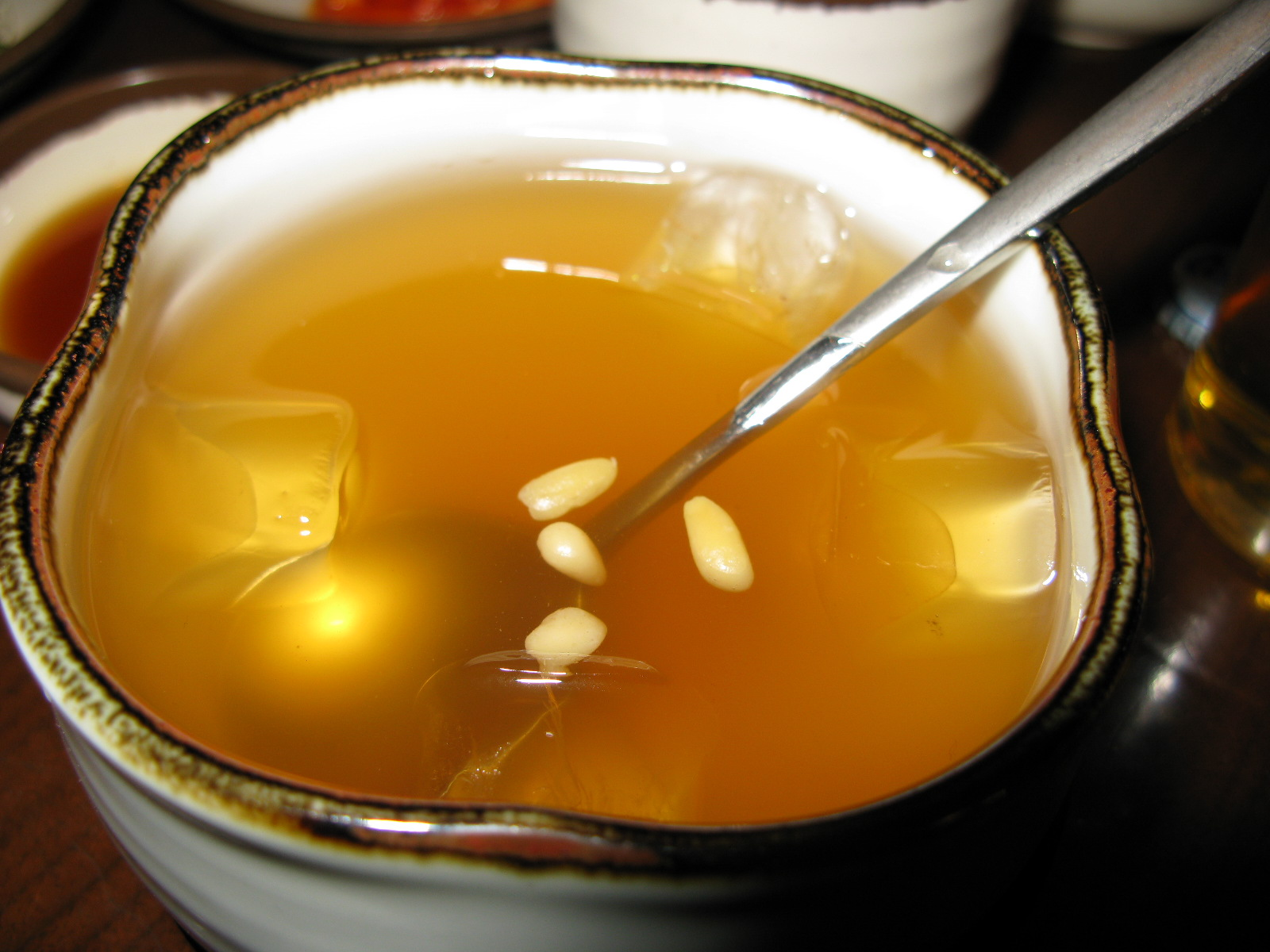
Maesil-cha

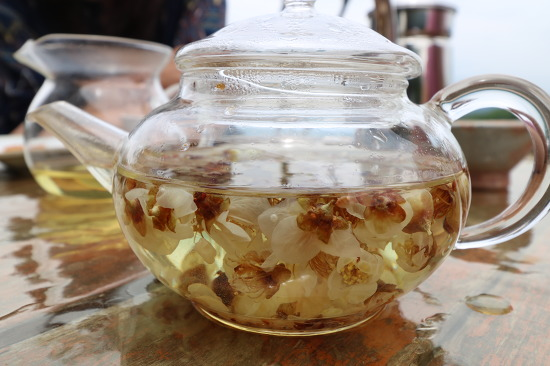
Maehwa-cha

In China, suanmeitang (酸梅湯; "sour plum juice") is made from smoked plums, called wumei (烏梅). The plum juice is extracted by boiling smoked plums in water and sweetened with sugar to make suanmeitang. It ranges from light pinkish-orange to purplish black in colour and often has a smoky and slightly salty taste. It is traditionally flavoured with sweet osmanthus flowers, and is enjoyed chilled, usually in summer.

In Korea, both the flowers and the fruits are used to make tea. Maehwa-cha (매화차, 梅花茶; "plum blossom tea") is made by infusing the flowers in hot water. Maesil-cha (매실차, 梅實茶; "plum tea") is made by mixing water with maesil-cheong (plum syrup) and is served either hot or cold.

In Japan, a similar drink is made from green plums and tastes sweet and tangy, is considered a cold, refreshing drink, and is often enjoyed in the summer.

==== Condiment ====
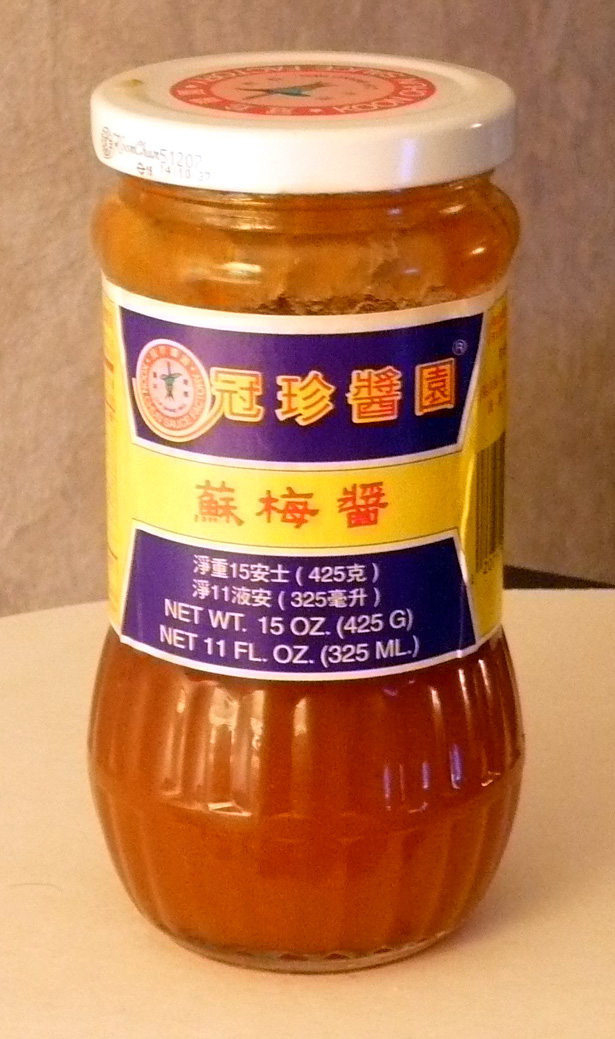
Meizijiang

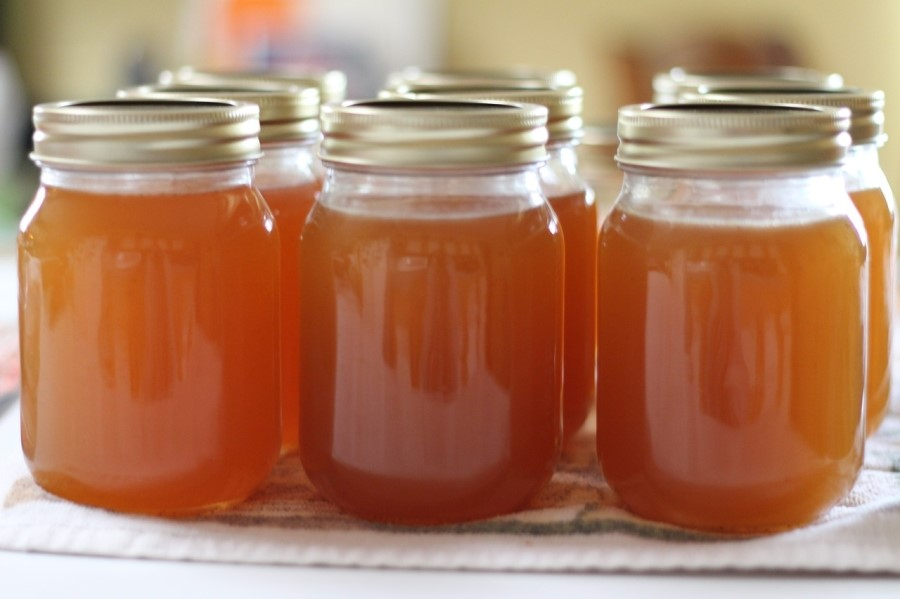
Maesil-cheong

A thick, sweet Chinese sauce called meijiang (梅醬) or meizijiang (梅子醬), usually translated as "plum sauce", is also made from the plums, along with other ingredients such as sugar, vinegar, salt, ginger, chili, and garlic. Similar to duck sauce, it is used as a condiment for various Chinese dishes, including poultry dishes and egg rolls.

In Korea, maesil-cheong (매실청, 梅實淸, "plum syrup"), a syrup made by sugaring ripe plums, is used as a condiment and sugar substitute. It can be made by simply mixing plums and sugar together, and then leaving them for about 100 days. To make syrup, the ratio of sugar to plum should be at least 1:1 to prevent fermentation, by which the liquid may turn into plum wine. The plums can be removed after 100 days, and the syrup can be consumed right away, or mature for a year or more.

==== Flower pancake ====
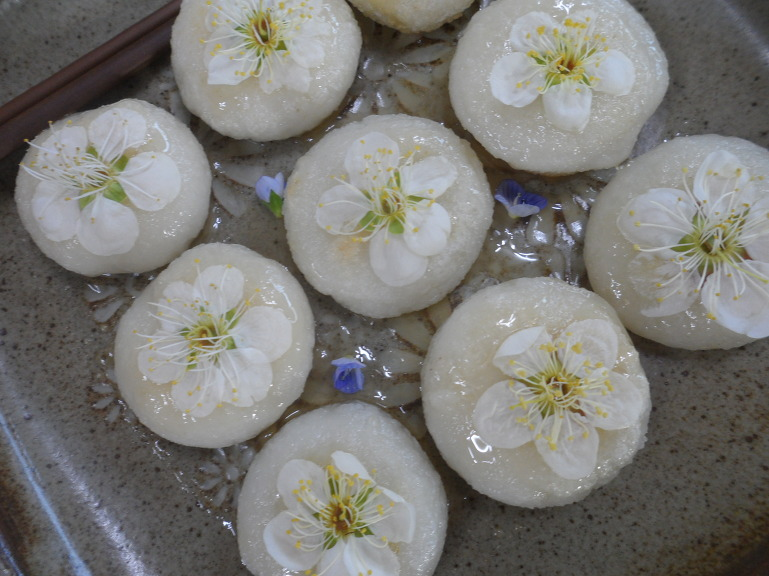
Maehwa-jeon

In Korea, hwajeon (화전, 花煎; "flower pancake") can be made with plum blossoms. Called maehwa-jeon (매화전, 梅花煎; "plum blossom pancake"), the pancake dish is usually sweet, with honey as an ingredient.

==== Liquor ====
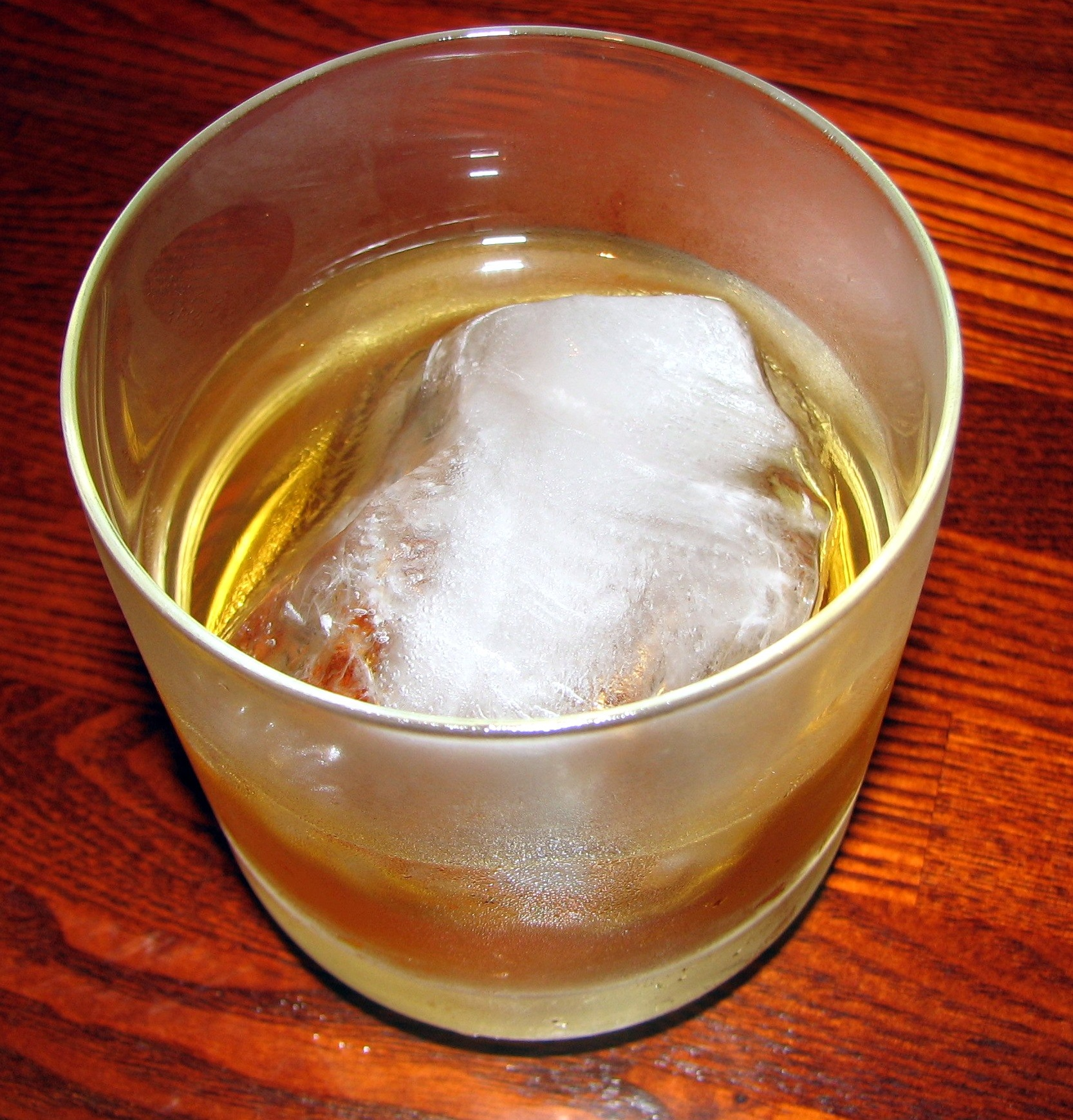
Umeshu

Plum liquor, also known as plum wine, is popular in both Japan and Korea, and is also produced in China. Umeshu (梅酒; "plum wine") is a Japanese alcoholic drink made by steeping green plums in shōchū (clear liquor). It is sweet and smooth. A similar liquor in Korea, called maesil-ju (매실주, 梅實酒; "plum wine"), is marketed under various brand names, including Mae hwa soo, Matchsoon, and Seoljungmae. Both the Japanese and Korean varieties of plum liquor are available with whole plum fruits contained in the bottle. In China, plum wine is called méijiǔ (梅酒).

In Taiwan, a popular 1950s innovation over the Japanese-style plum wine is the wumeijiu (烏梅酒; "smoked plum liquor"), which is made by mixing two types of plum liquor, meijiu (梅酒) made of P. mume and lijiu (李酒), made of P. salicina, and oolong tea liquor.

In Vietnam, ripe plums are macerated in sticky rice liquor. The resulting liquor is called rượu mơ.

==== Pickled and preserved plums ====
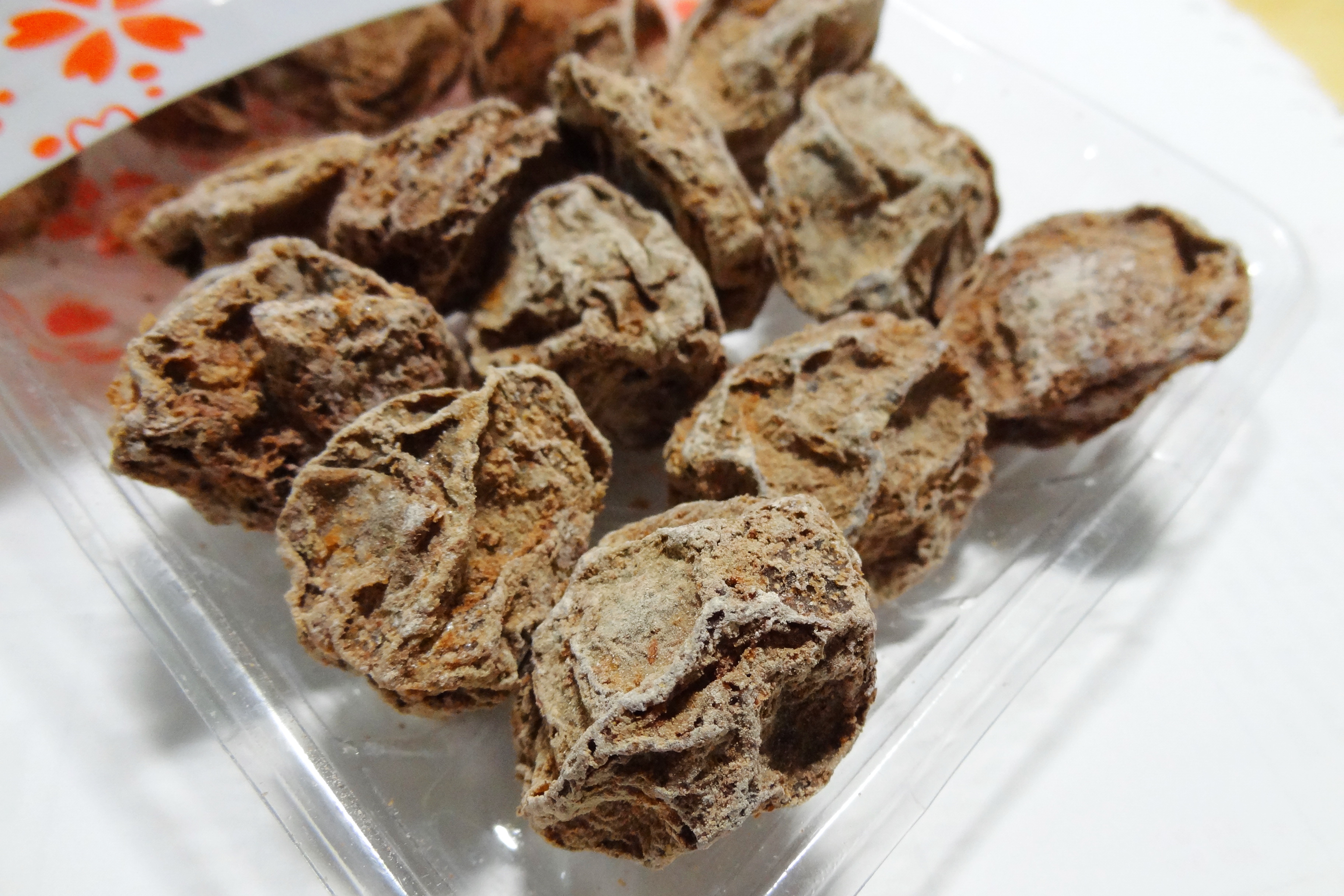
Li hing mui

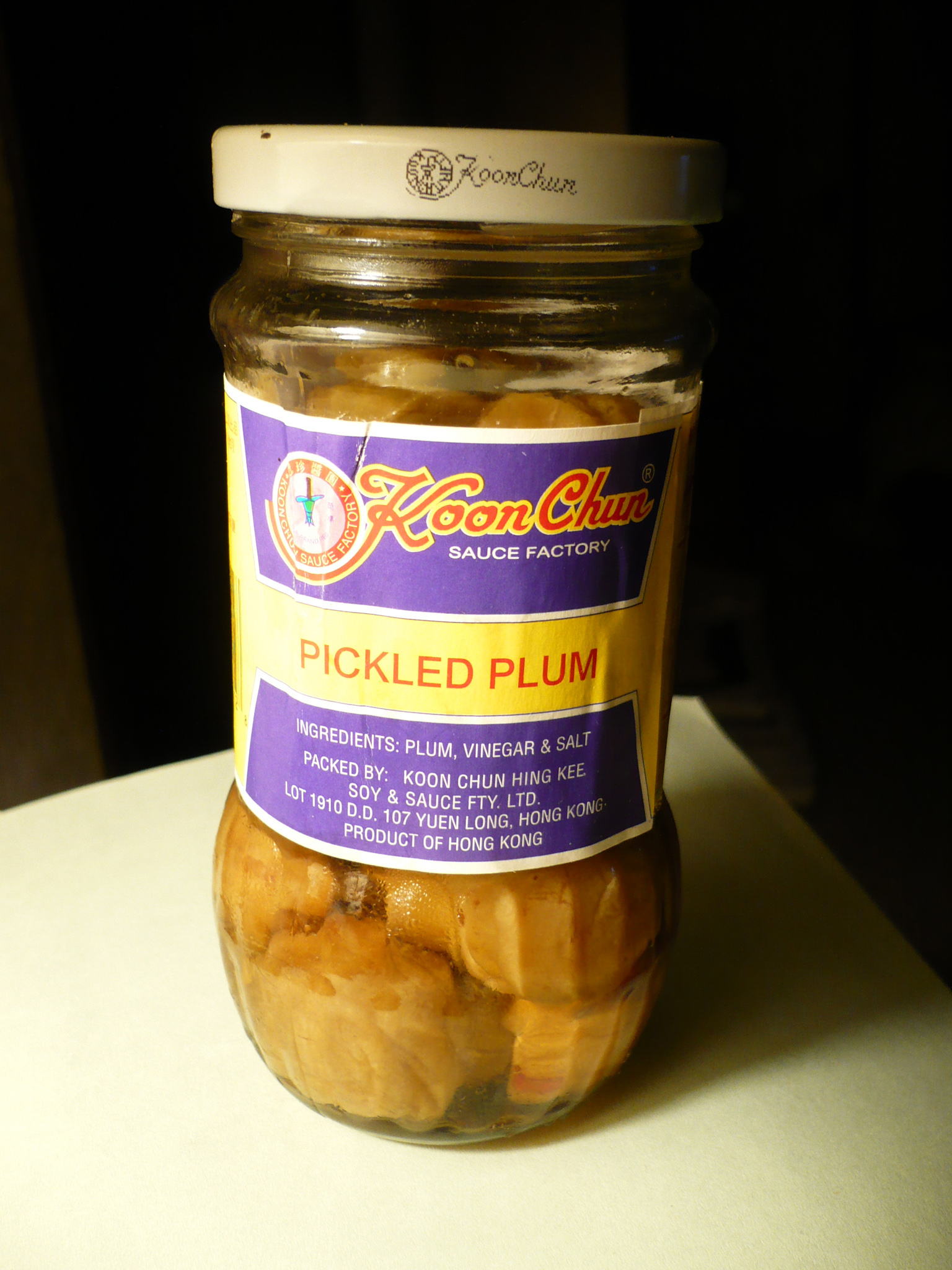
Suanmeizi

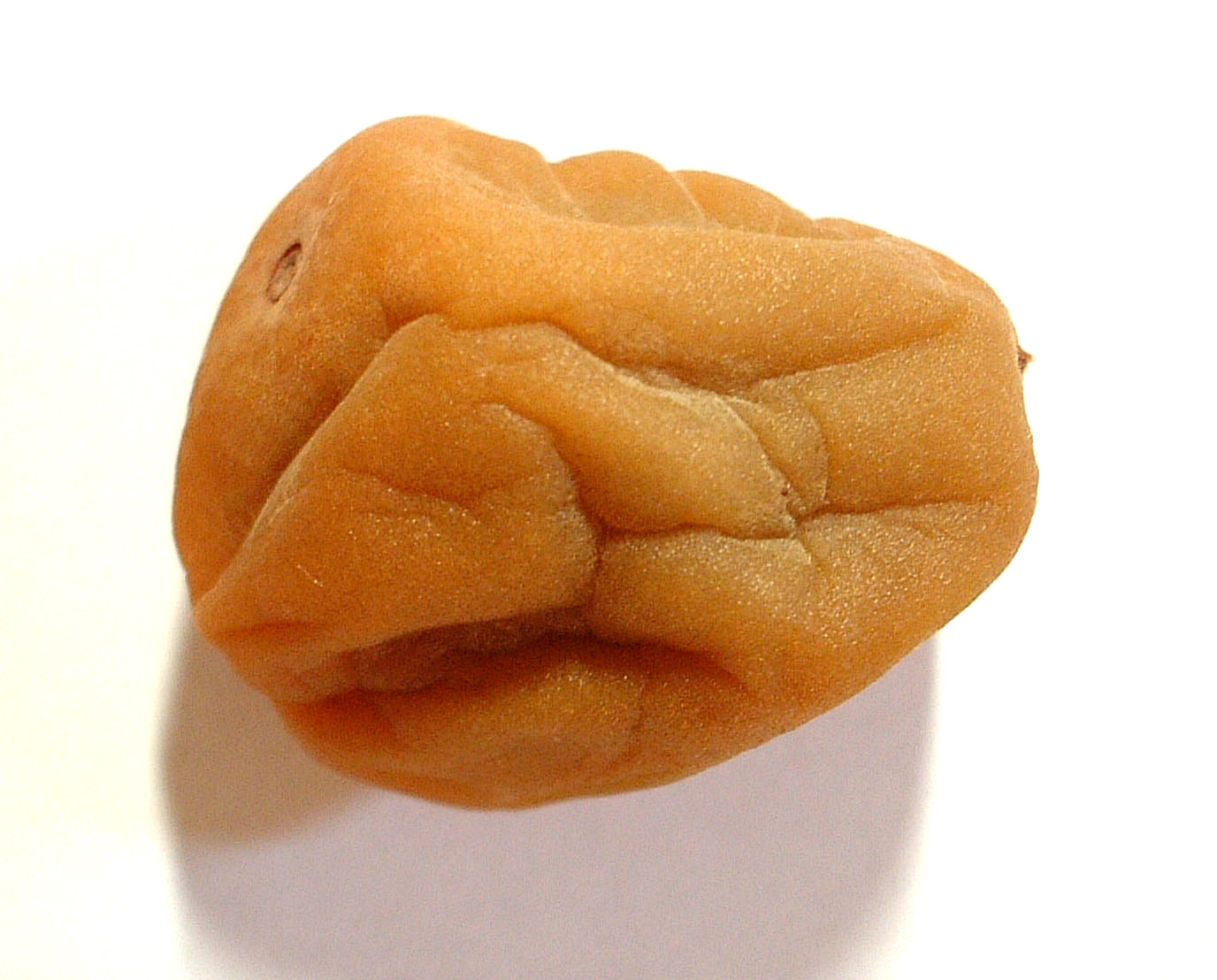
Umeboshi

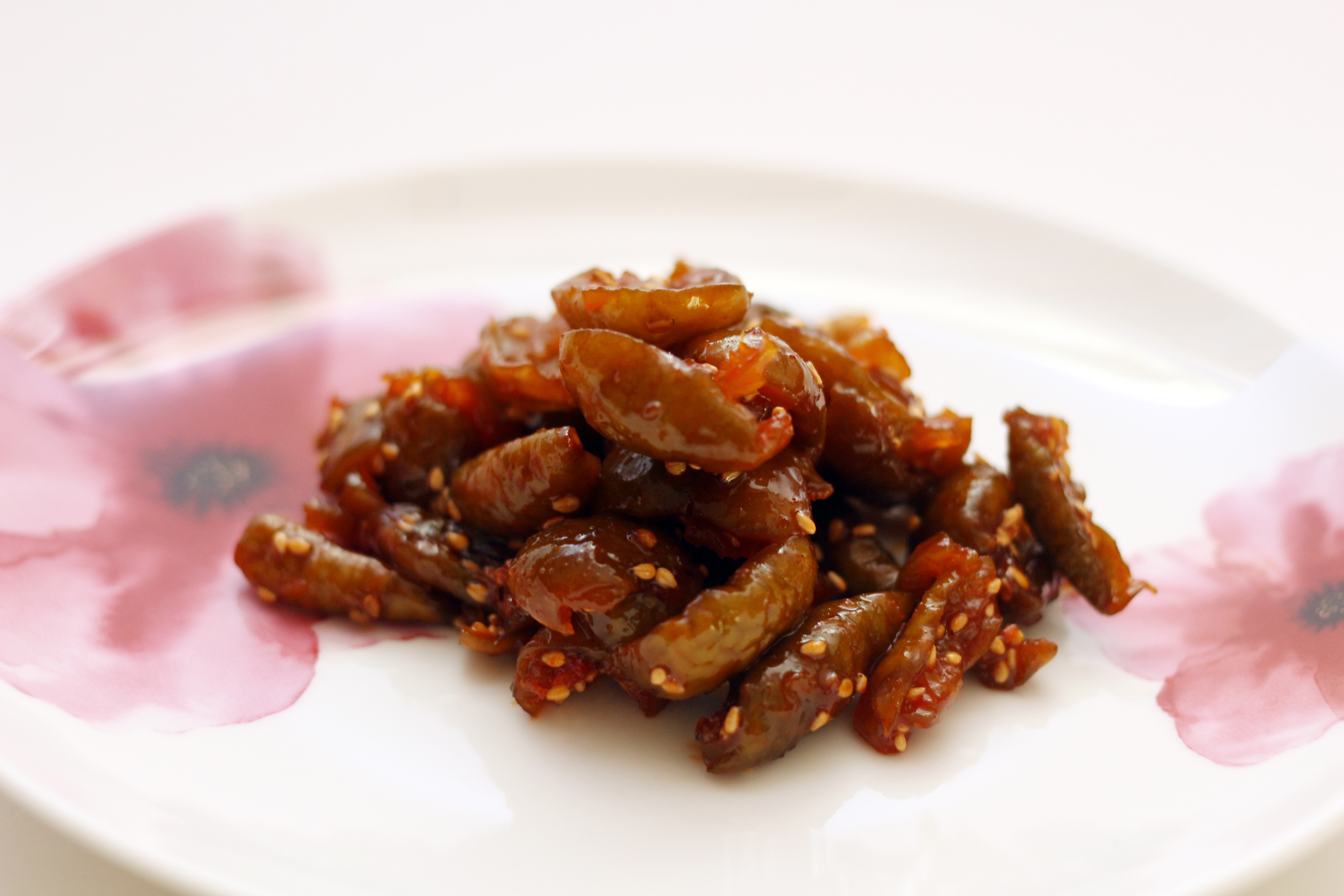
Maesil-jangajji

In Chinese cuisine, plums pickled with vinegar and salt are called suanmeizi (酸梅子; "sour plum fruits"), and have an intensely sour and salty flavour. They are generally made from unripe plum fruits. Huamei (話梅) are Chinese preserved plums and refer to Chinese plums pickled in sugar, salt, and herbs. There are two general varieties: a dried variety, and a wet (pickled) variety.

Umeboshi (梅干) are pickled and dried plums. They are a Japanese specialty. Pickled with coarse salt, they are quite salty and sour, and therefore eaten sparingly. They are often red in colour when purple shiso leaves are used. Plums used for making umeboshi are harvested in late May or early June, while they are ripe enough in yellow, and layered with much salt. They are weighed down with a heavy stone (or some more modern implement) until late August. They are then dried in the sun on bamboo mats for several days (they are returned to the salt at night). The flavonoid pigment in shiso leaves gives them their distinctive colour and a richer flavour. Umeboshi are generally eaten with rice as part of a bento (boxed lunch), although they may also be used in makizushi (rolled sushi). Umeboshi are also used as a popular filling for rice balls (onigiri) wrapped in nori. Makizushi made with plums may be made with either umeboshi or bainiku (umeboshi paste), often in conjunction with green shiso leaves. A byproduct of umeboshi production is umeboshi vinegar, a salty, sour condiment.

In Korea, there is 'maesil-jangajji' which is similar to 'umeboshi'. It is a common side dish in Korea.

A very similar variety of pickled plum, xí muội or ô mai is used in Vietnamese cuisine. The best fruit for this are from the forest around the Hương Pagoda in Hà Tây Province.

=== Traditional medicine ===
Prunus mume is a common fruit in Asia and is used in traditional Chinese medicine.

== Cultural significance ==
Plum blossoms are celebrated across the East Asian cultural sphere, beginning in China and later introduced to Vietnam, Korea, and Japan.

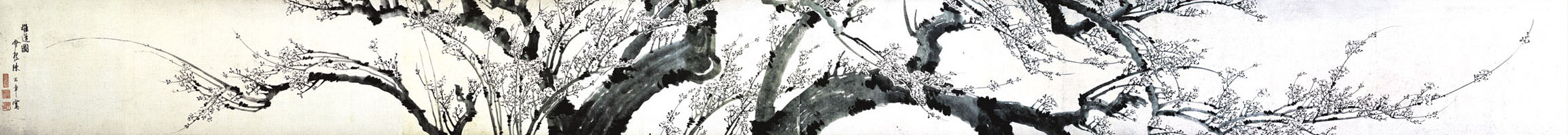
"Clustering Chinese Plum Blossoms" by Ming painter Chen Lu, Hunan Provincial Museum collection

=== East Asia ===
==== Chinese ====
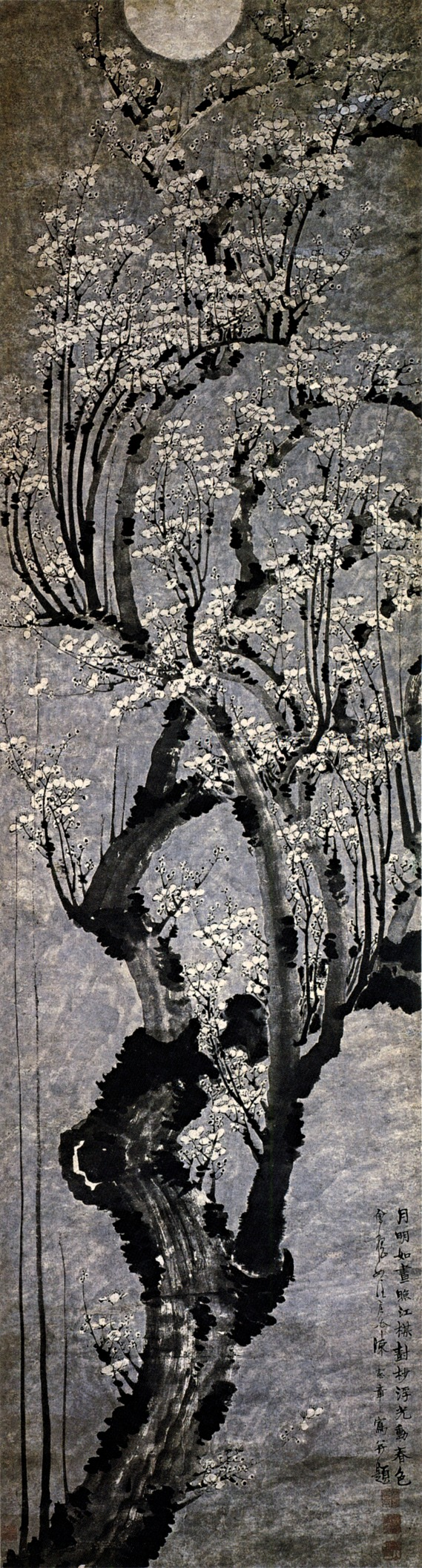
"Plum Blossoms" by the painter Chen Lu (陳錄)

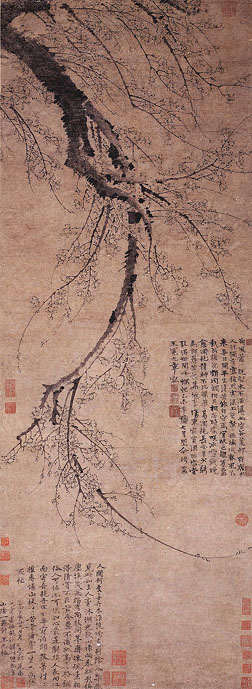
"Blossoming plum" by the painter Wang Mian (王冕)

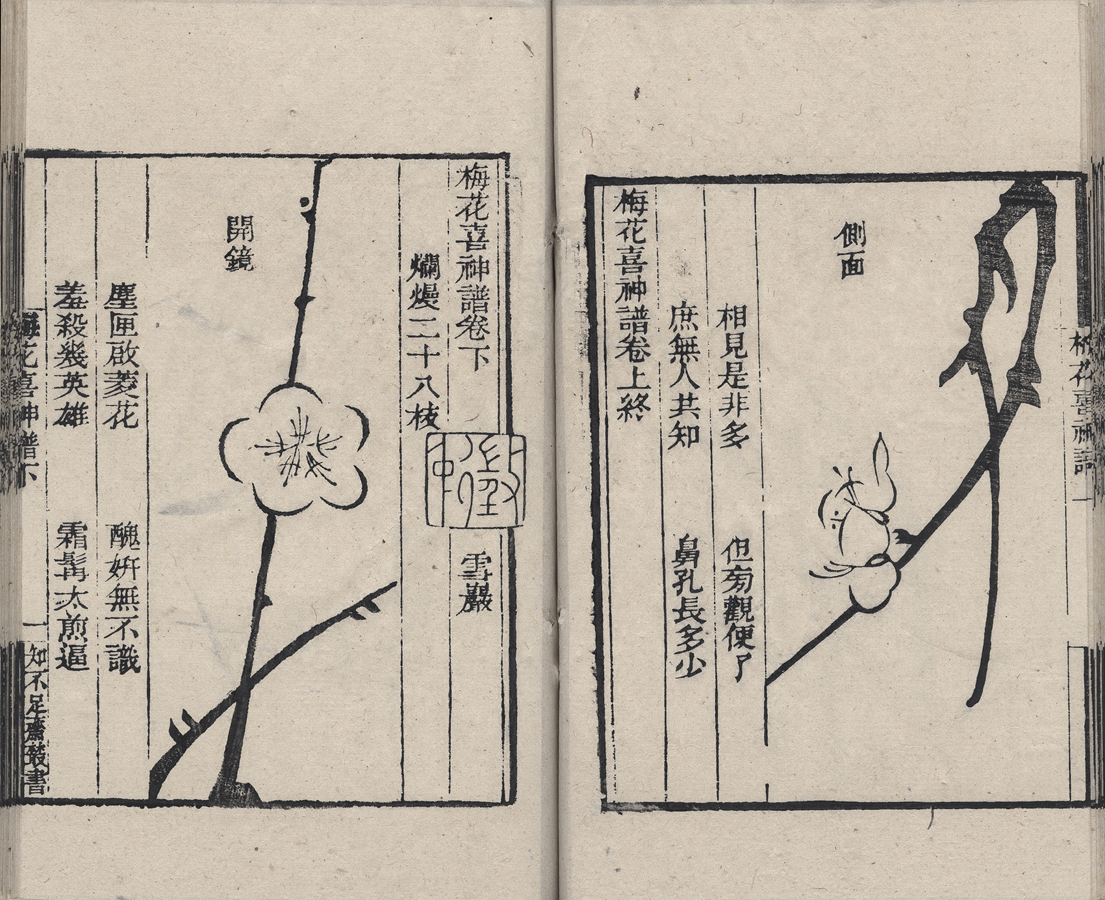
Manual of Plum Blossom Painting, by Song Dynasty painter Song Boren

The plum blossom, which is known as the meihua (梅花), is one of the most beloved flowers in China and has been frequently depicted in Chinese art and poetry for centuries. The plum blossom is seen as a symbol of winter and a harbinger of spring. The blossoms are so beloved because they are viewed as blooming most vibrantly amidst the winter snow, exuding an ethereal elegance, while their fragrance is noticed to still subtly pervade the air at even the coldest times of the year. Therefore, the plum blossom came to symbolize perseverance and hope, as well as beauty, purity, and the transitoriness of life. In Confucianism, the plum blossom stands for the principles and values of virtue. More recently, it has also been used as a metaphor to symbolize revolutionary struggle since the turn of the 20th century.

Because it blossoms in the cold winter, the plum blossom is regarded as one of the "Three Friends of Winter", along with pine, and bamboo. The plum blossom is also regarded as one of the "Four Gentlemen" of flowers in Chinese art, together with the orchid, chrysanthemum, and bamboo. It is one of the "Flowers of the Four Seasons", which consist of the orchid (spring), the lotus (summer), the chrysanthemum (autumn) and the plum blossom (winter). These groupings are seen repeatedly in the Chinese aesthetic of art, painting, literature, and garden design.

An example of the plum blossom's literary significance is found in the life and work of poet Lin Bu (林逋) of the Song dynasty (960–1279). For much of his later life, Lin Bu lived in quiet reclusion on a cottage by West Lake in Hangzhou, China. According to stories, he loved plum blossoms and cranes so much that he considered the plum blossom of Solitary Hill at West Lake as his wife and the cranes of the lake as his children, thus he could live peacefully in solitude. One of his most famous poems is "Little Plum Blossom of Hill Garden" (山園小梅). The Chinese text, as well as a translation, follows:

眾芳搖落獨暄妍，
占斷風情向小園。
疏影橫斜水清淺，
暗香浮動月黃昏。
霜禽欲下先偷眼，
粉蝶如知合斷魂。
幸有微吟可相狎，
不須檀板共金樽。

Translation:

When everything has faded they alone shine forth,
encroaching on the charms of smaller gardens.
Their scattered shadows fall lightly on clear water,
their subtle scent pervades the moonlit dusk.
Snowbirds look again before they land,
butterflies would faint if they but knew.
Thankfully, I can flirt in whispered verse,
I don't need a sounding board or winecup.

As with the literary culture amongst the educated of the time, Lin Bu's poems were discussed in several Song dynasty era commentaries on poetry. Wang Junqing remarked after quoting the third and fourth line: "This is from Lin Hejing's [Lin Bu's] plum blossom poem. Yet these lines might just as well be applied to the flowering apricot, peach, or pear."—a comparison of the flowers with the plum blossom to which the renowned Song dynasty poet Su Dongpo (蘇東坡) replied, "Well, yes, they might. But I'm afraid the flowers of those other trees wouldn't presume to accept such praise." Plum blossoms inspired many people of the era.

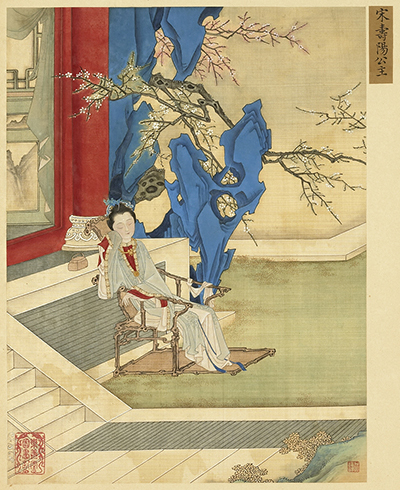
Princess Shouyang, who is prominently featured in a Chinese legend about plum blossoms

Legend has it that once on the 7th day of the 1st lunar month, while Princess Shouyang (壽陽公主), daughter of Emperor Wu of Liu Song (劉宋武帝), was resting under the eaves of Hanzhang Palace near the plum trees after wandering in the gardens, a plum blossom drifted down onto her fair face, leaving a floral imprint on her forehead that enhanced her beauty further. The court ladies were said to be so impressed that they started decorating their own foreheads with a small delicate plum blossom design. This is also the mythical origin of the floral fashion, meihua chuang (梅花妝; literally "plum blossom makeup"), that originated in the Southern Dynasties (420–589) and became popular amongst ladies in the Tang (618–907) and Song (960–1279) dynasties. The markings of plum blossom designs on the foreheads of court ladies were usually made with paintlike materials such as sorghum powder, gold powder, paper, jade, and other tint substances. Princess Shouyang is celebrated as the goddess of the plum blossom in Chinese culture.

During the Ming dynasty (1368–1644), the garden designer Ji Cheng wrote his definitive garden architecture monograph Yuanye and in it, he described the plum tree as the "beautiful woman of the forest and moon". The appreciation of nature at night plays an important role in Chinese gardens. For this reason, there are classical pavilions for the tradition of viewing plum blossoms by the moonlight. The flowers are viewed and enjoyed by many as annual plum blossom festivals take place in the blooming seasons of the meihua. The festivals take place throughout China (for example, West Lake in Hangzhou and scenic spots near Zijin Mountain in Nanjing, amongst other places). Plum blossoms are often used as decoration during the Spring Festival (Chinese New Year) and remain popular in the miniature gardening plants of the art of penjing. Branches of plum blossoms are often arranged in porcelain or ceramic vases, such as the meiping (literally "plum vase"). These vases can hold single branches of plum blossoms and have been traditionally used to display the blossoms in a home since the early Song dynasty (960–1279).

The Moy Yat lineage of Wing Chun kung fu uses a red plum flower blossom as its symbol. The plum blossoms are featured on one of the four flowers that appear on mahjong tile sets, where mei (梅) is usually simply translated as "plum" in English.

It has been suggested that the Japanese practice of hanami may have originated from the Chinese custom of enjoying poetry and wine underneath plum blossom trees while viewing their flowers, that was replicated by Japanese elites. This is supported by the fact that hanami started in urban areas rather than rural areas, that Japanese people initially admired plum blossoms like the Chinese rather than cherry blossoms, and that classic Japanese poetry does not associate cherry blossoms with merriness.

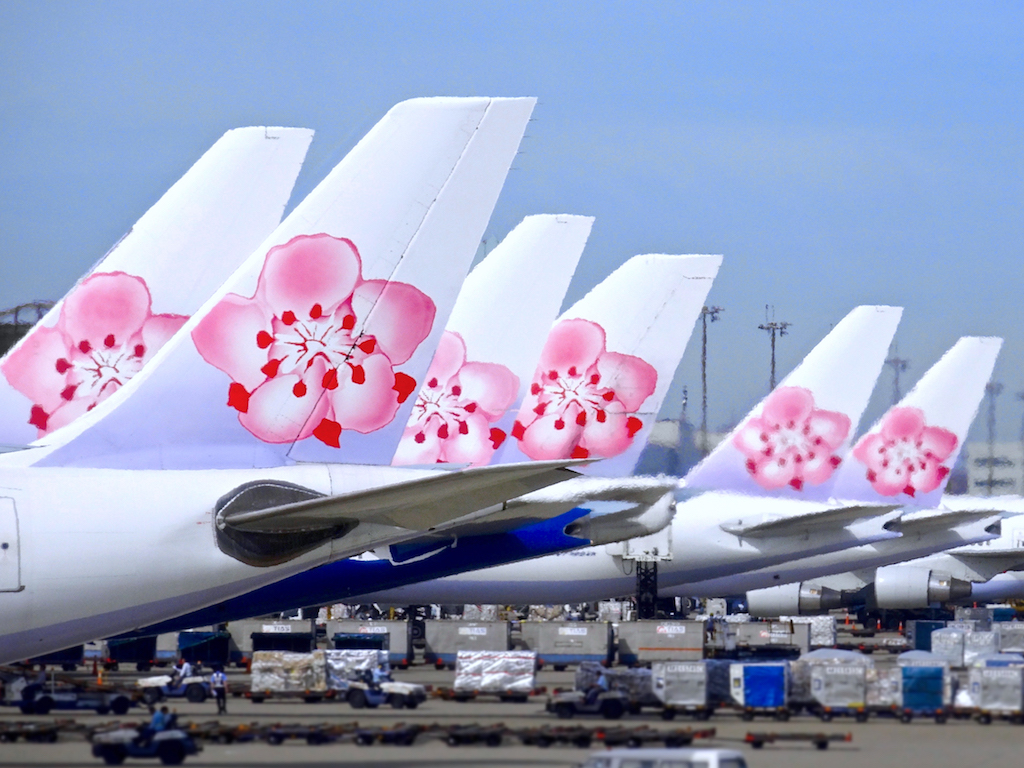
Plum blossoms painted on China Airlines aircraft tails.

The National Flower of the Republic of China (Taiwan) was officially designated as the plum blossom (Prunus Mei; Chinese: 梅花) by the Executive Yuan of the Republic of China on July 21, 1964. The plum blossom is the symbol for resilience and perseverance in the face of adversity during the harsh winter. The triple grouping of stamens (three stamens per petal) on the national emblem represents Sun Yat-sen's Three Principles of the People, while the five petals symbolize the five branches of the government. It also serves as the logo of China Airlines, the national carrier of Taiwan (the Republic of China). The flower is featured on some New Taiwan dollar coins.

==== Korean ====
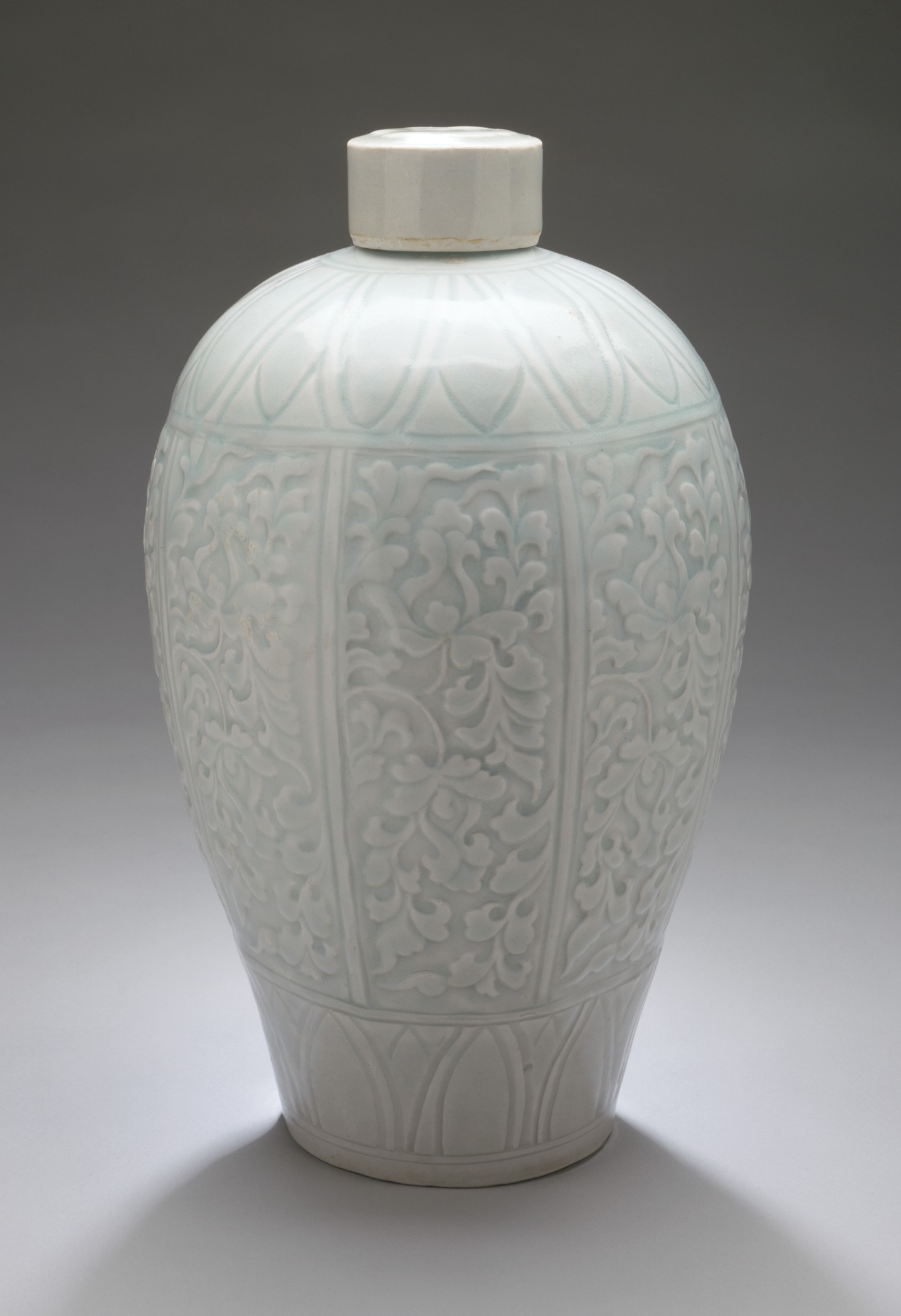
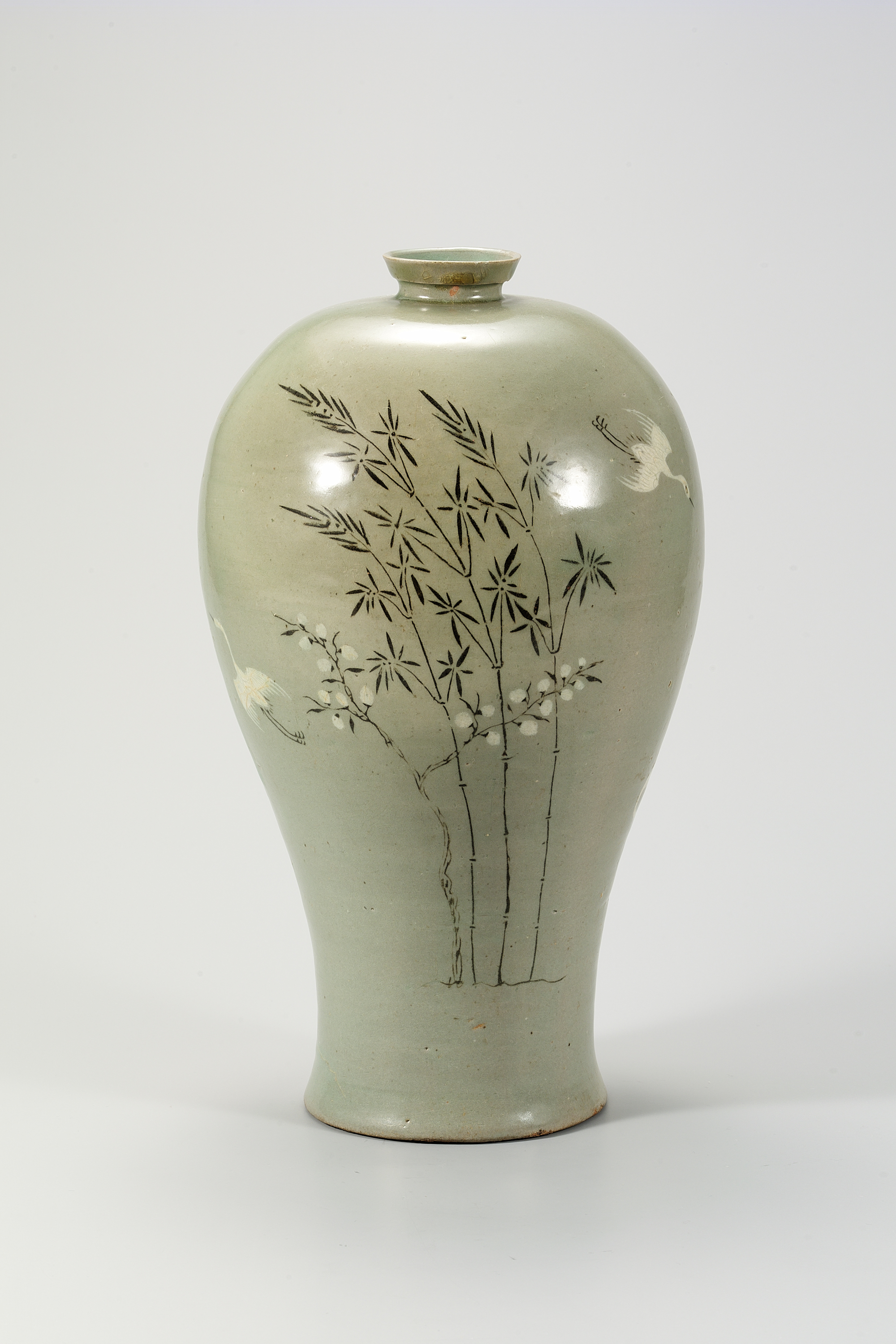
Song meiping and Goryeo maebyong

In Korea, the plum blossom is a symbol for spring. It is a popular flower motif, amongst other flowers, for Korean embroidery. Maebyong are plum vases derived from the Chinese meiping and are traditionally used to hold branches of plum blossoms in Korea. Korean ceramist Master Kim Se-yong incorporates the blossom into many of his openwork celadon vases.

Also, during Korean Empire period, the plum blossom became the imperial seal and royal official flower. Since ancient times, plum blossom has been filled with meaning and mystery. Plum blossoms bloom at the end of the winter, and because of this, they are called the herald of spring. They also symbolize perseverance because of how they can possibly bloom during the cold winter. Since they are considered the first flower of the year, they also represent purity and renewal. Plum flowers have five petals which are believed to carry 5 different blessings such as: wealth, health, virtue, peaceful and natural death.

==== Japanese ====
Plum blossoms are often mentioned in Japanese poetry as a symbol of spring, as well as elegance and purity. When used in haiku or renga, they are a kigo or season word for early spring. The blossoms are associated with the Japanese bush warbler and are depicted together on one of the twelve suits of hanafuda (Japanese playing cards). Plum blossoms were favored during the Nara period (710–794) until the emergence of the Heian period (794–1185), in which the cherry blossom was preferred.

Japanese tradition holds that the ume functions as a protective charm against evil, so the ume is traditionally planted in the northeast of the garden, the direction from which evil is believed to come. The eating of the pickled fruit for breakfast is also supposed to stave off misfortune.

The tradition of hanami was originally performed with plum blossoms rather than cherry blossoms as is common today. The specific custom of viewing plum blossoms in Japan is now called umemi (梅見, plum-viewing).

=== Southeast Asia ===
==== Vietnamese ====
In Vietnam, due to the beauty of the tree and its flowers, the word mai is used to name girls. The largest hospital in Hanoi is named Bạch Mai (white plum blossom), another hospital in Hanoi is named Mai Hương ("the scent of plum"), situated in Hồng Mai (pink plum blossom) street. Hoàng Mai (yellow plum blossom) is the name of a district in Hanoi. Bạch Mai is also a long and old street in Hanoi. All these places are located in the south part of Hanoi, where, in the past, many P. mume trees were grown.

== See also ==
- Chinese garden
- Chinese cuisine
- Japanese cuisine
- Korean cuisine
- Vietnamese cuisine
- Greengage
- Typhoon Muifa, various typhoons named for the Macanese form of the Chinese word for the plum blossom
