= Umeshu =

Japanese liqueur

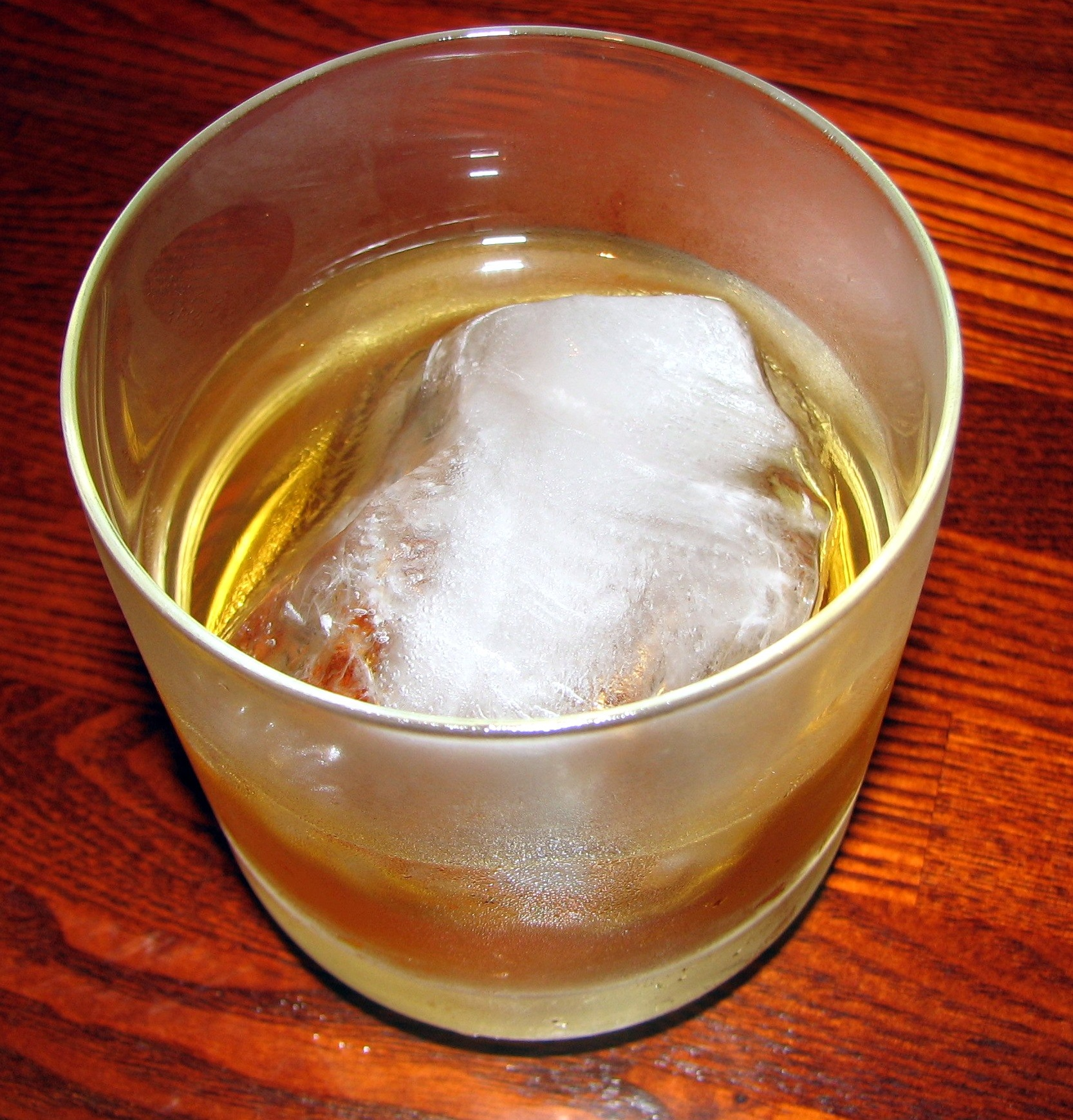
Umeshu on the Rocks (Umeshu Rokku)

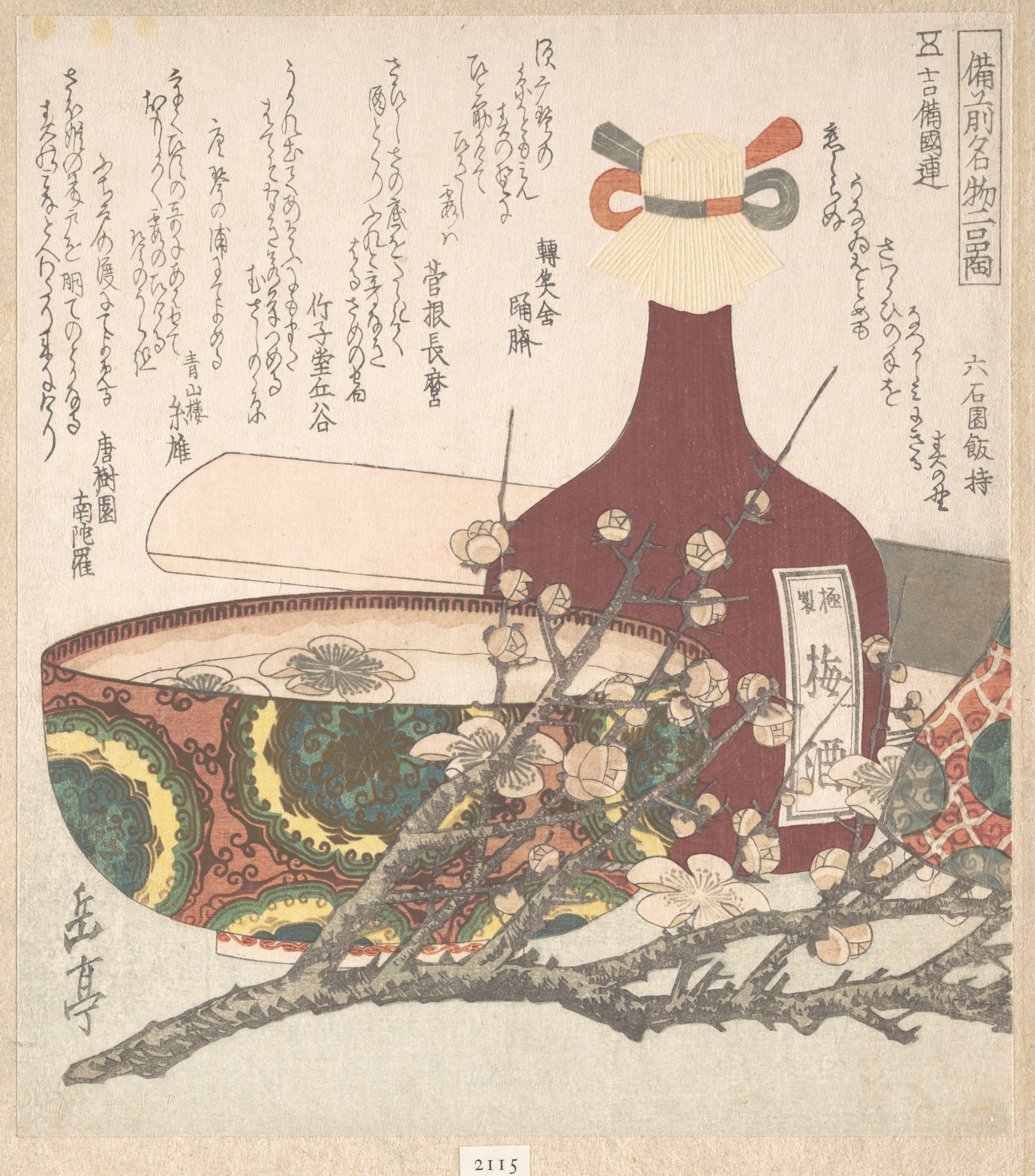
Yashima Gakutei

Umeshu (梅酒) is a Japanese liqueur made by steeping unripe ume plums in liquor (焼酎, shōchū) and sugar. It has a sweet and sour taste, and an alcohol content of around 10–15% ABV. Famous brands of umeshu include Choya, Takara Shuzo and Matsuyuki. Some commercial umeshu varieties contain whole ume fruits in the bottle.

Japanese restaurants serve many different varieties of umeshu and also make cocktails. Umeshu on the Rocks (pronounced umeshu rokku), Umeshu Sour (pronounced umeshu sawa), Umeshu Tonic (with tonic water), and Umeshu Soda (with carbonated water) are popular. It is sometimes mixed with green tea (o-cha-wari) or warm water (o-yu-wari). Umeshu can be served at different temperatures; chilled or with ice, room temperature, or hot in the winter.

Umeshu can be made either from real plum fruit, or using additive flavours and perfumes to emulate the taste of plums. Umeshu which is made from exclusively plum fruit (without additives) will be labelled as Honkaku Umeshu and will typically be made only from ume fruit, sugar, and alcohol.

== History ==
The production of umeshu has a long history in Japan. The ume tree, which had been cultivated for 4000 years, had uses in Chinese natural medicine and was prized ornamentally. Many millennia later, it gained another use. Umeshu recipes appear about 300 years ago, and umeshu was produced both at home and commercially by the time of the late Edo period. Choya, one of the top umeshu manufacturers, began production in 1959, and now exports their products around the world.

== Homemade umeshu ==
- Main ingredients include:
  - Ume fruits
  - Sugar (rock)
  - Shōchū
- Traditional recipe:
  - Ume fruit 1 kg
  - Sugar 500g–1 kg (rock/cubes)
  - Shōchū 1.8l
- After three months in a cold and dark place, it is ready to be consumed (although it is better to wait at least six months)

Umeshu should be allowed to mature for at least nine months.

== Flavors ==
An increasing amount of scientific research focusing on odorants and volatiles present in the umeshu bouquet has identified primary aromas. Gas chromatography-mass spectroscopy was used to analyze aromatic substances and determined 38 compounds. The study also emphasized that benzaldehyde concentrations started off high and declined in storage, which they assert is correlated with an increase in complexity and the trademark umeshu flavor. They assert that benzoic acid and associated esters and acetals are the primary product of age-related chemical changes.

== See also ==
- Suanmeitang, Chinese plum beverage
- Maesil-ju, Korean plum wine
