= Choya Umeshu =

Japanese liqueur company

Choya Umeshu チョーヤ梅酒株式会社
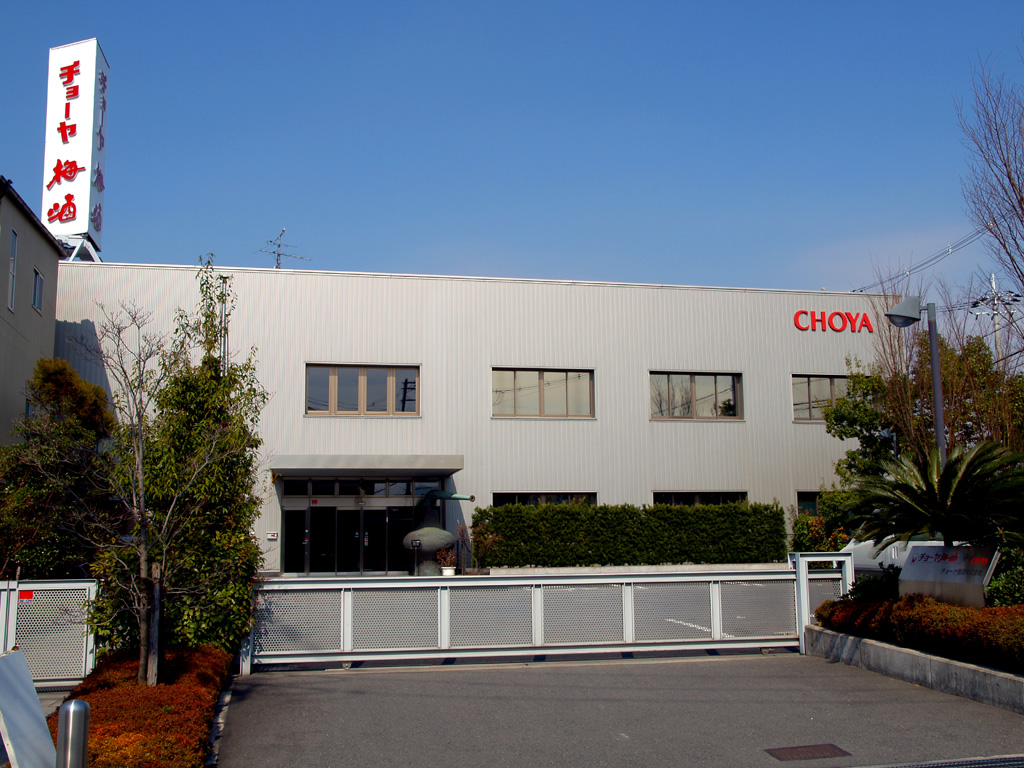
- Company type: Public K.K.
- Industry: Beverages, Foods
- Founded: 1914
- Founder: Sumitaro Kondo
- Headquarters: Habikino, Osaka, Japan
- Key people: Shigehiro Kondo (CEO); Yukio Kondo (Chairman)
- Number of employees: 144
- Website: www.choya.com

Choya Umeshu Co., Ltd. (チョーヤ梅酒株式会社, Chōya Umeshu Kabushiki-gaisha), or Choya, is a Japanese company headquartered in Habikino, Osaka, Japan, which specializes in the production and sales of umeshu plum liqueur. Its other main businesses include brandy, sake, wine, and foods. The company started producing umeshu in 1959. As of 2011, the company's products are distributed to more than 60 countries.

== History ==
- 1914: Started cultivating grapes.
- 1924: Company was established by Sumitaro Kondo. Started producing and selling wine.
- 1949: Started producing and selling brandy.
- 1951: Started producing and selling fruit wine.
- 1959: Started producing and selling ume fruit liqueur.
- 1962: Establishment of Choya Yoshu Jozo Co., Ltd.
- 1968: Started producing and selling medicinal herbal liqueur. Started exporting ume fruit liqueur.
- 1973: Started producing and selling medicinal liqueur.
- 2000: The company was renamed Choya Umeshu Co., Ltd.
- 2009: Launched a cosmetic brand "Choya Puranasu" as a mail-order product
- 2010: Company changes its logo to "Choya".

== Main products ==
- Choya Umeshu
- Choya Soda
- Choya Soda 0% (Non-alcoholic soda)
- Choya Sarari
- Choya Excellent (Monde Selection, Grand Gold Quality Award)
- Choya Kokuto Umeshu (Monde Selection, Gold Quality Award) However, Monde Selection awards are non-competitive and only products that pay to enter are judged.

== Production facilities ==
- Osaka Honsha Factory (Habikino, Osaka)
- Osaka Kawamukai Factory (Habikino, Osaka)
- Kishu Factory (Tanabe, Wakayama)
- Iga Ueno Factory (Iga, Mie)
