= Maesil-ju =

Korean plum wine

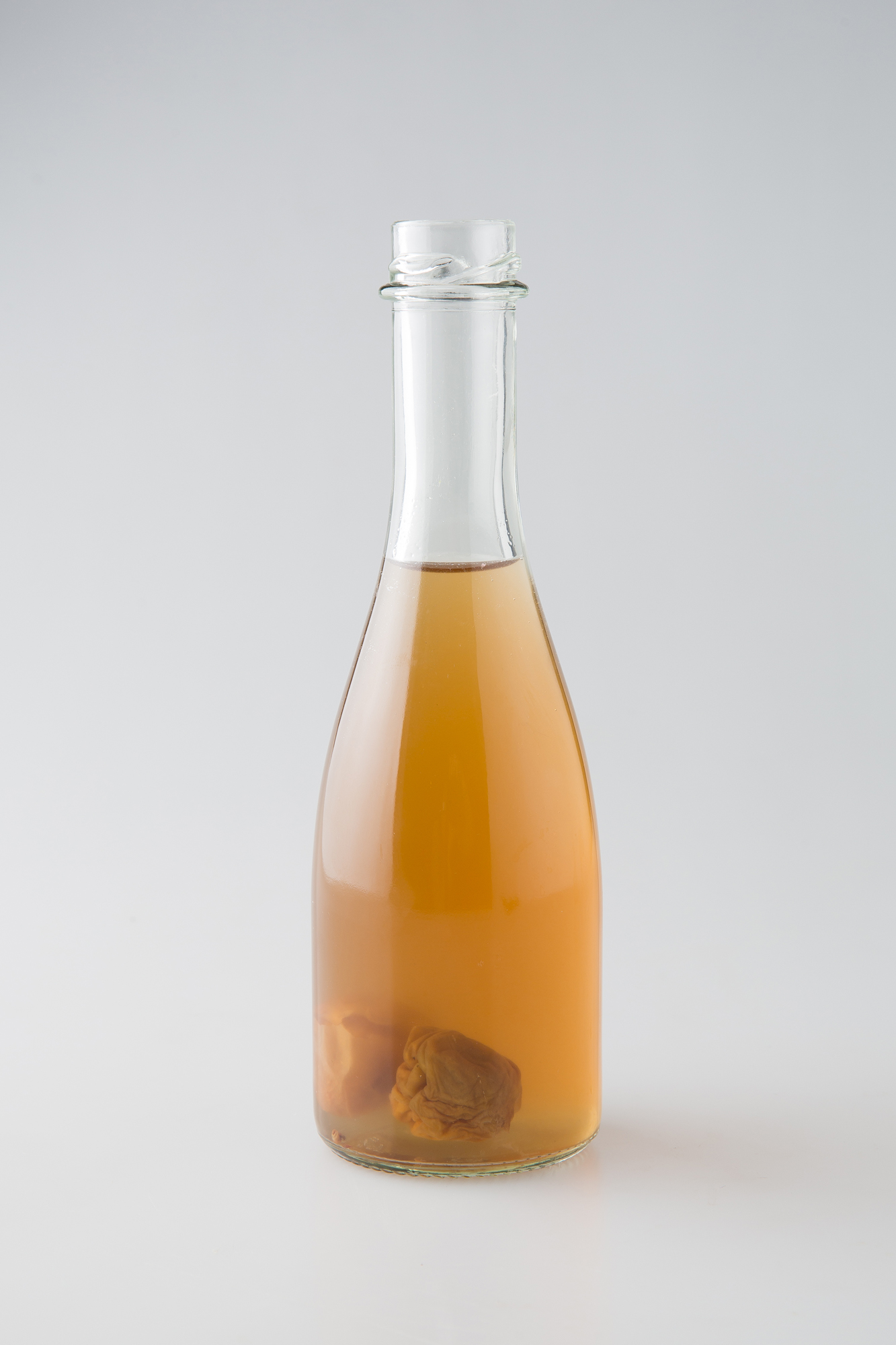
- Type: Plum wine
- Origin: Korea
- Alcohol by volume: 10-35%
- Ingredients: Maesil (plums)

Korean name
- Hangul: 매실주
- Hanja: 梅實酒
- RR: maesilju
- MR: maesilchu
- IPA: [mɛ.ɕil.t͈ɕu]

Maesil-ju (Korean: 매실주), also called plum wine, plum liquor, or plum liqueur, is an alcoholic drink infused with maesil (plums). The exact origins of Maesil-ju are unknown, but it is thought to date back to the 918–1392 Goryeo period.

== Ingredients ==
Maesil-ju is made with maesil (매실; 梅實; "plums"), preferably ripe hwangmae (황매; 黃梅; "yellow plums"), which are yellowish in color, fragrant and firm. Unripe cheongmae (청매; 靑梅; "green plums")—firmer and less fragrant—can also be used. Bruised or over-ripened plums may make the wine cloudy. Damaged fruits should be avoided, as direct contact of plum seeds with alcohol may produce a small amount of prussic acid, due to the amygdalin in plum seeds. However, toxicity vanishes after a year of maturation. Ripe plums have much lower amygdalin content.

Typically, 3 litres (0.66 imp gal; 0.79 US gal) of soju (of 20% ABV) and 100–150 grams (3.5–5.3 oz) of sugar is used per 1 kilogram (2.2 lb) of plums. Sugar can be substituted with slightly more honey, and soju of 20% ABV can be substituted by 2 litres (0.44 imp gal; 0.53 US gal) soju (or any other unflavored spirit) of 30% ABV and 1 litre (0.22 imp gal; 0.26 US gal) of water.

== Preparation ==
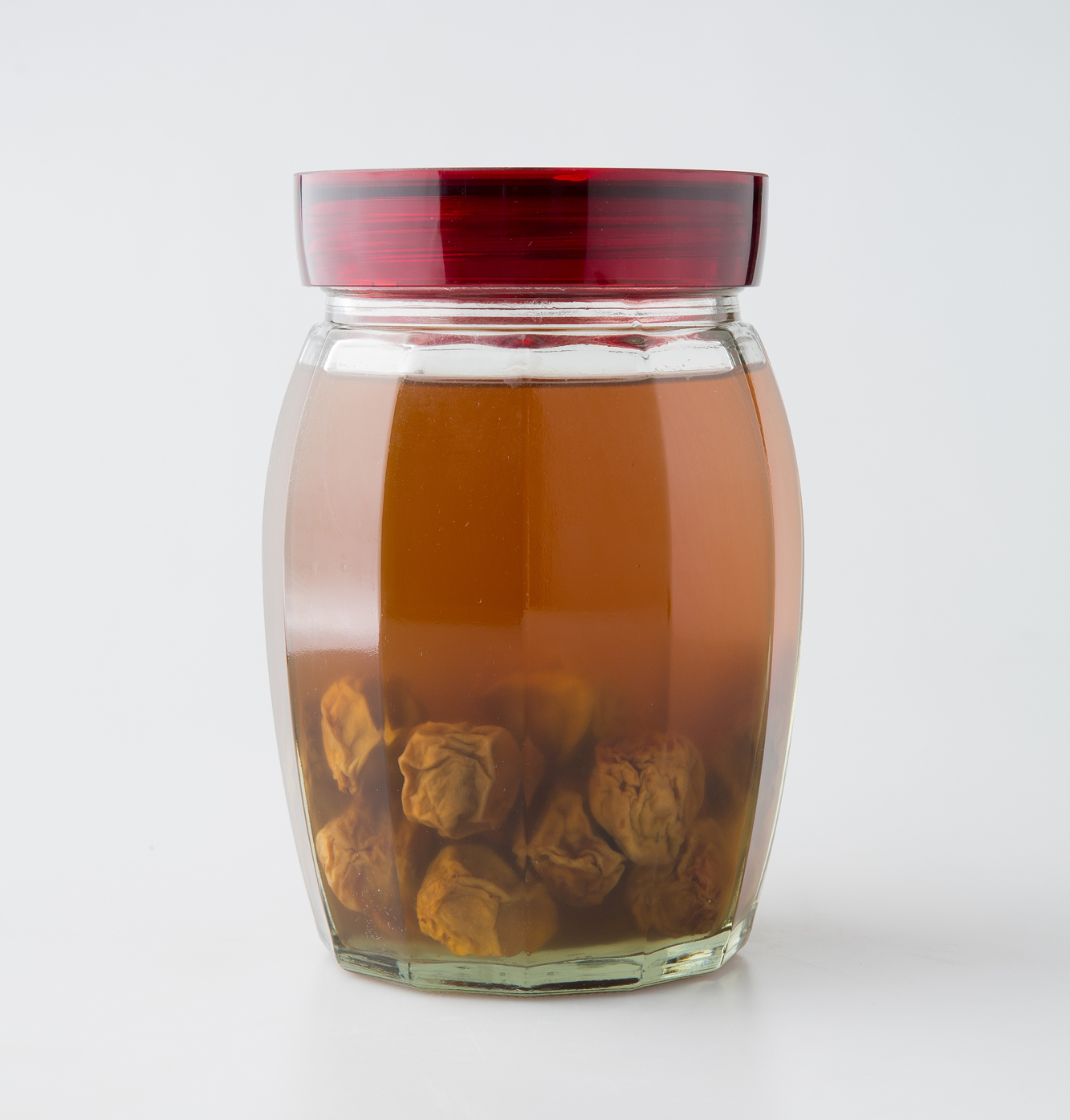
Maesil-ju in a glass jug

Plums are washed in cold water and dried on a tray for a day. Dried plums and soju are added to a sterilized glass or earthenware jug and infused for about 100 days. The fruits are then removed by sieving, and sugar is added to the plum wine. The wine can be consumed immediately, but three to six months of maturation will greatly enrich the wine's flavour.

== Commerce ==
Popular maesil-ju products include Mae hwa soo, Matchsoon, and Seoljungmae.

== See also ==
- Maesil-cha, plum tea
- Maesil-cheong, plum syrup
- Umeshu, Japanese plum liqueur
- Suanmeitang, Chinese plum beverage
