= O. indicum =

O. indicum may refer to:

- Oidium indicum, a plant pathogen species
- Oroxylum indicum, a tree species found in Asia

== See also ==
- Indicum (disambiguation)
