= C. indicum =

C. indicum may refer to:

- Chaetoderma indicum, a mollusc species in the genus Chaetoderma
- Chaetomium indicum, a fungus
- Chiloscyllium indicum, the slender bamboo shark, a shark species found in the Indo-West Pacific Oceans
- Chrysanthemum indicum, a flowering plant species

== See also ==
- Indicum (disambiguation)
