= Chrysanthemum tea =

Flower (chrysanthemum)-based tea infusion

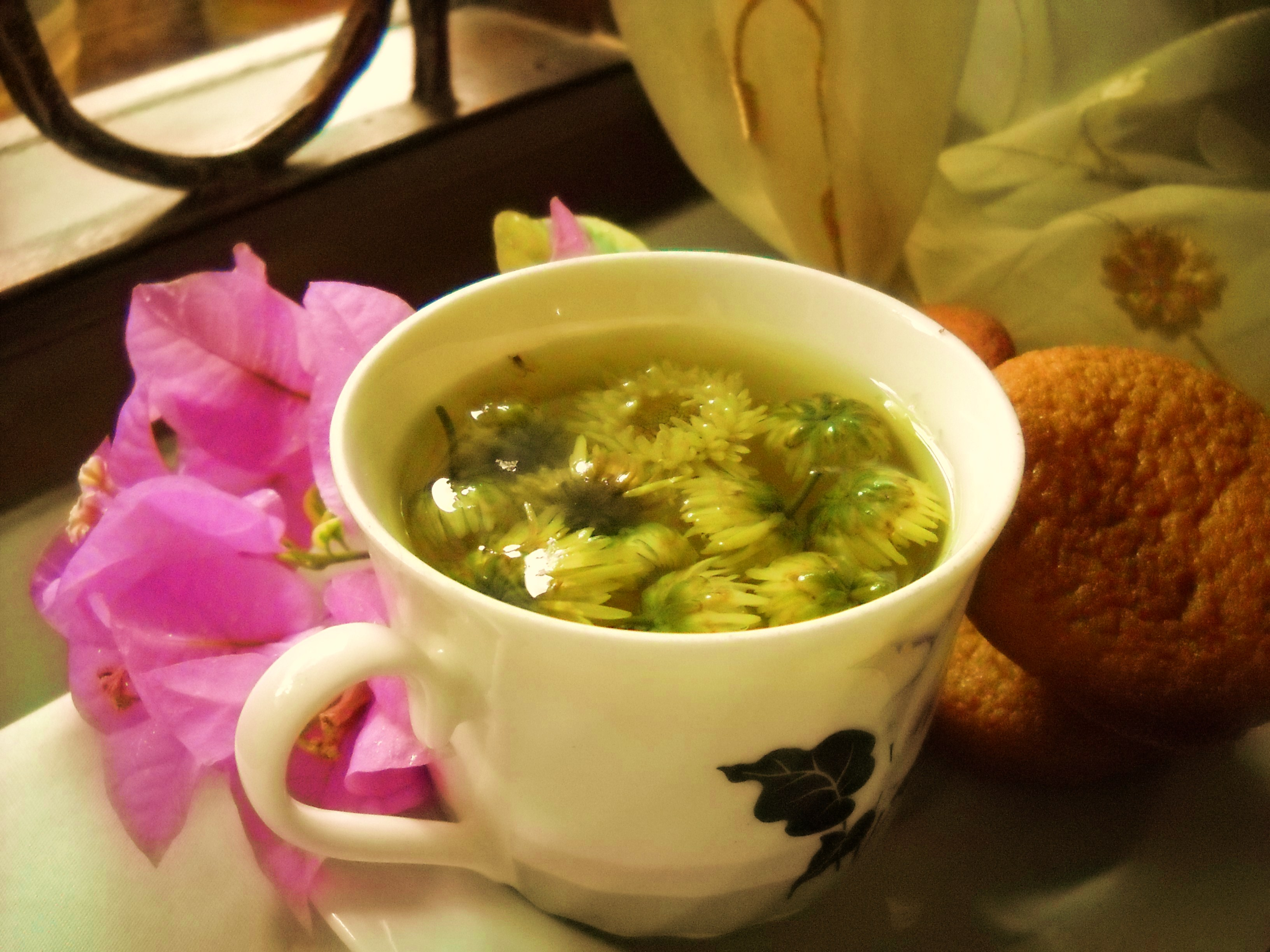
- Type: Herbal tea
- Other names: Gukhwa-cha; júhuā-chá
- Origin: China (Song dynasty)
- Quick description: Tea made from dried chrysanthemum
- Temperature: 100 °C (212 °F)
- Time: 2‒3 minutes

Regional names

Chinese name
- Chinese: 菊花茶
Transcriptions
Standard Mandarin
- Hanyu Pinyin: júhuā chá
- Wade–Giles: chü^{2}-hua^{1}-ch'a^{2}
Hakka
- Romanization: kiug faˋ ca
Yue: Cantonese
- Yale Romanization: gūk fā chàh
- Jyutping: guk^{1} faa^{1} caa^{4}
Southern Min
- Hokkien POJ: kiok-hoe-tê

Vietnamese name
- Vietnamese: trà hoa cúc

Thai name
- Thai: น้ำเก๊กฮวย
- RTGS: nam kekhuai

Korean name
- Hangul: 국화차
- Hanja: 菊花茶
Transcriptions
- Revised Romanization: gukhwacha
- McCune–Reischauer: kukhwach'a

Malay name
- Malay: teh bunga kekwa, teh krisantimum

Indonesian name
- Indonesian: teh krisan (Chi Hua Ching)

Tamil name
- Tamil: saamandhi

Chrysanthemum tea is a flower-based infusion beverage made from the chrysanthemum flowers of the species Chrysanthemum morifolium or C. indicum, which are most popular throughout East and Southeast Asia.

To prepare the tea, chrysanthemum flowers (usually dried) are steeped in hot water (usually 90 to 95 degrees Celsius after cooling from a boil) in either a teapot, cup, or glass; often rock sugar or cane sugar is also added. The resulting drink is transparent and ranges from pale to bright yellow in color, with a floral aroma. In Chinese tradition, once a pot of fresh chrysanthemum tea has been drunk, hot water is typically added again to the flowers in the pot (producing a tea that is slightly less strong); this process is often repeated several times.

Chrysanthemum are first cultivated in China as a herb as early as the 1500 BCE, making tea from them became popular during the Song dynasty.

== Varieties ==
=== China ===
Several varieties of chrysanthemum, ranging from white to pale or bright yellow in color, are used for tea. These include:

- Huángshān-gòngjú (黄山贡菊, literally "Yellow Mountain tribute chrysanthemum"); also called simply gòngjú (贡菊)
- Hángbáijú (杭白菊), originating from Tongxiang, near Hangzhou; also called simply Hángjú, (杭菊)
- Chújú (滁菊), originating from the Chuzhou district of Anhui
- Bójú (亳菊), originating in the Bozhou district of Anhui

Of these, the first two are most popular. Some varieties feature a prominent yellow flower head while others do not.

=== Korea ===
Gukhwacha (국화차; 菊花茶) is made from dried Indian chrysanthemum collected before fully opened.

- Chrysanthemum tea – The flowers are blanched in bamboo salt water, carefully washed in cold water and drained on kitchen towel. The drained flowers are covered with hanji and dried in an ondol (floor-heated) room. When served, three to four flowers are added to hot water.
- Honey chrysanthemum tea – The flowers are carefully washed and dried, then preserved in honey for three to four weeks. When served, the preserved flowers are added to hot water.
- Medicinal chrysanthemum tea – The flowers are washed carefully, steamed using the water mixed with herbal decoction and dried. When fully dried, they are steamed again, and dried again. This process is repeated nine times. Water to decoction ratio can be 8:1, and the decoction is usually made of dried roots of white woodland peony, steamed and dried roots of rehmannia, dried roots of Korean angelica, and dried roots of lovage.

== Commercial availability ==
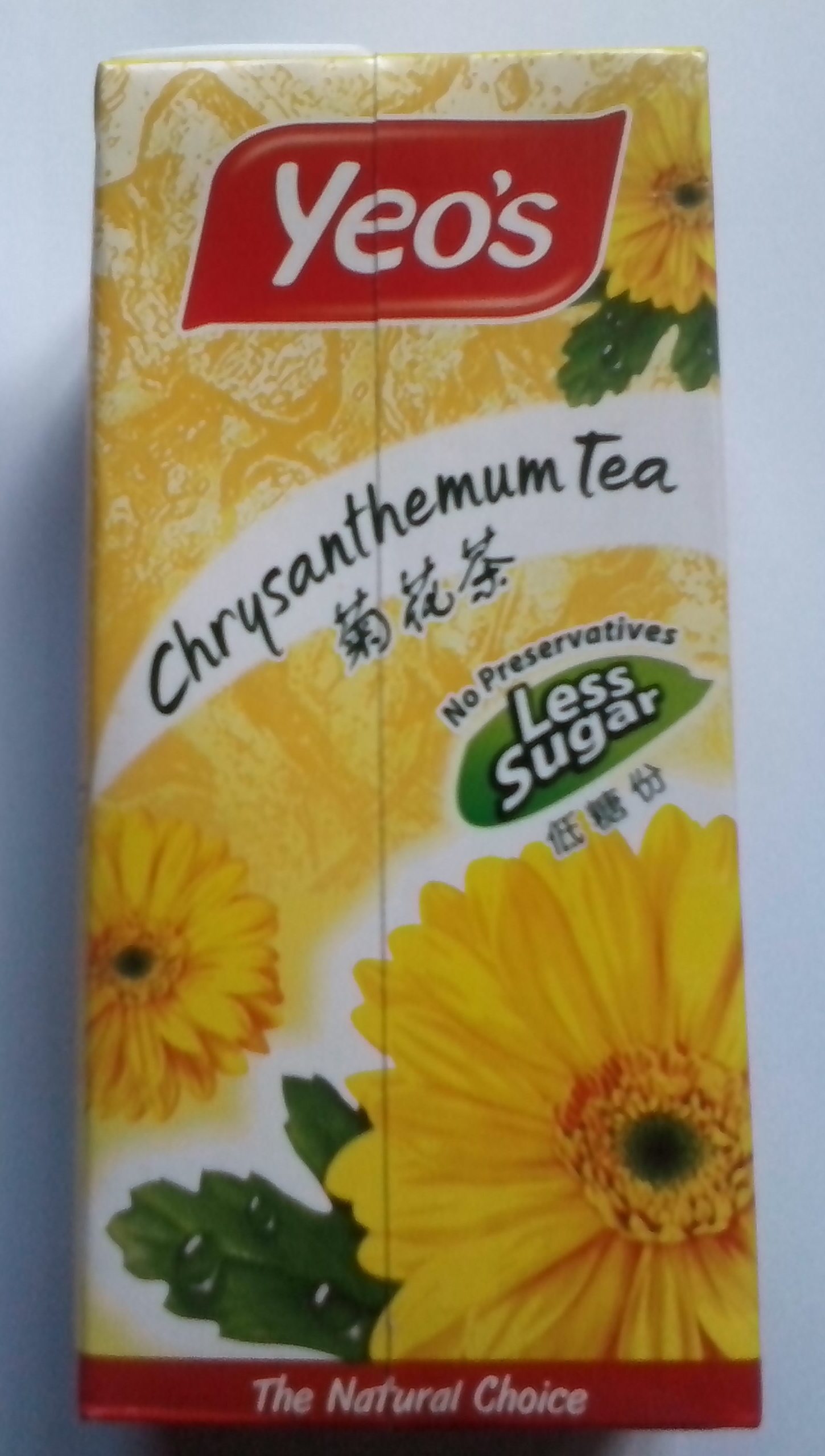
A small box of chrysanthemum tea by Singaporean brand Yeo's.

Although typically prepared at home, chrysanthemum tea is sold in many Asian restaurants (particularly Chinese), and in various Asian grocery stores in and outside Asia in canned or packed, as either a whole flower or teabag presentation. Chrysanthemum tea may be sold in cartons.

== Medicinal use ==
Chrysanthemum tea is used in traditional Chinese medicine to treat respiratory and visual ailments, and contains a variety of phenolic and phytochemical compounds. It has antioxidant and anti-inflammatory effects and has been found in laboratory studies to kill cancer cells, although this effect has not been confirmed in the human body.

Chrysanthemum tea can interfere with the metabolism of immunosuppressive drugs.

== See also ==
- Chinese herb tea
- List of Chinese teas
- List of Chinese inventions
- Traditional Korean tea
- Xia Sang Ju
