= I. indica =

I. indica may refer to:

- Iole indica, the yellow-browed bulbul, a passerine bird species
- Ipomoea indica, a plant species
- Istompax indica, a marlin species (Black Marlin)

== See also ==
- Indica (disambiguation)
