= Xia Sang Ju =

Chinese herbal drink

- Chinese: 夏桑菊
Transcriptions
Standard Mandarin
- Hanyu Pinyin: Xiàsāngjú
- Wade–Giles: Hsia^{4} sang^{1} chu^{2}
Yue: Cantonese
- Jyutping: Haa6 song1 guk1

Xia Sang Ju, also spelled xiasangju, is a kind of Chinese herbal drink made by soups cooked from dried leaves of Heal-all (Xia, Prunella vulgaris) and White mulberry (Sang, Morus alba), as well as a kind of dried yellow sweet chrysanthemum (Ju, Chrysanthemum indicum, 甘菊). Such a drink originated from a famous herbal-drink formula in Qing dynasty called Sang Ju drink (桑菊飲) for expelling an epidemic spread in East China in 1814. It is easily available in East Asia or Asian groceries as a box of ready-to-drink small packets.

Research has been done on the lipid-soluble and water-soluble components of the herbal drinks by Hong Kong University of Science and Technology. They found that such ingredients can help to prevent the spread of H5N1 and the common cold. Clinical tests are expected to start in 2010.

== See also ==
- Chrysanthemum tea
