= N. indica =

N. indica may refer to:

- Nepenthes indica, a synonym for Nepenthes distillatoria, a plant species
- Nesokia indica, the short-tailed bandicoot rat, a rodent species

== See also ==
- Indica (disambiguation)
