= Indika =

Indika may refer to:

- Several ancient Greek works on ancient India, most notably Indica by Megasthenes.
- Indika (video game), an adventure video game developed by Odd-Meter

== People ==
- Indika Anuruddha, Sri Lankan politician
- Indika Bandaranayake (b. 1972), Sri Lankan politician
- Indika Basnayake (b. 1979), Sri Lankan cricketer
- Indika Batuwitarachchi (b. 1974), Sri Lankan cricketer
- Indika de Saram (b. 1972), Sri Lankan cricketer
- Indika Dissanayake (b. 1989), Sri Lankan weightlifter
- Indika Gallage (b. 1975), Sri Lankan cricketer
- Indika Gunawardena (1943–2015), Sri Lankan politician
- Indika Kankanange (b. 1974), Sri Lankan cricketer
- Indika Ruwanpura (b. 1980), Sri Lankan cricketer
- Damith Indika (b. 1984), Sri Lankan cricketer
- Iran Indika (b. 1989), Sri Lankan cricketer
- Nuwan Indika (b. 1985), Sri Lankan cricketer
- Wehella Kankanamge Indika, Sri Lankan politician

== See also ==
- Indica (disambiguation)
