= Kankanamge =

Kankanamge is a surname. Notable people with the surname include:

- Sawan Kankanamge (born 1999), Sri Lankan cricketer
- Wehella Kankanamge Indika, Sri Lankan politician
