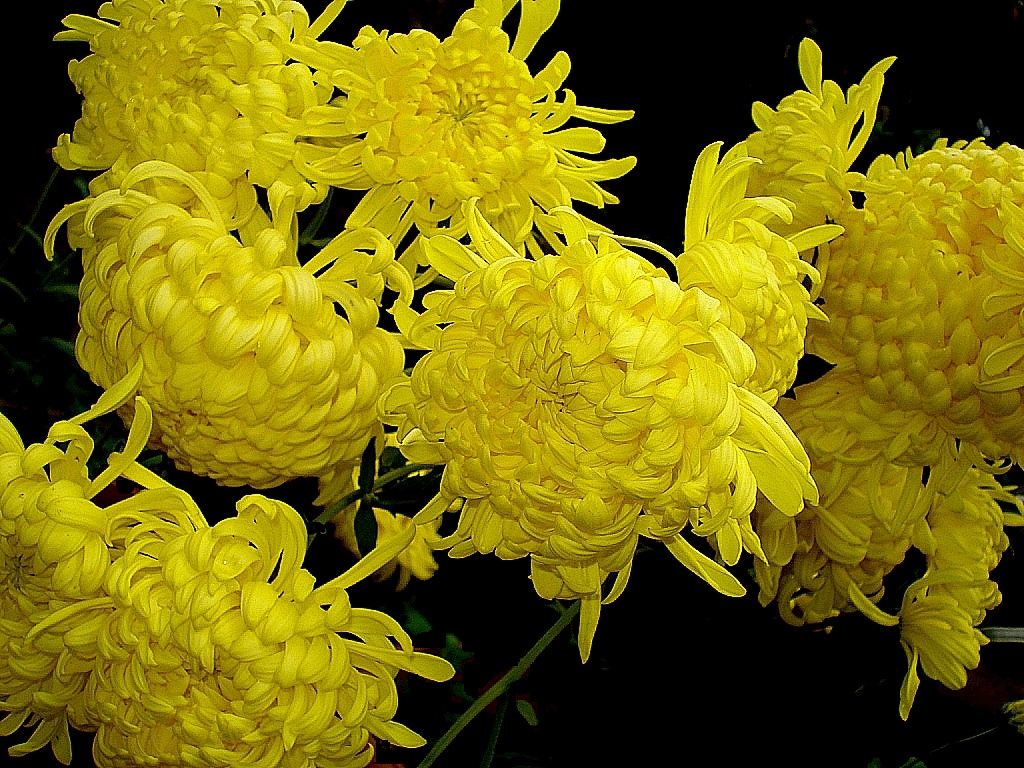

Scientific classification
- Kingdom: Plantae
- Clade: Tracheophytes
- Clade: Angiosperms
- Clade: Eudicots
- Clade: Asterids
- Order: Asterales
- Family: Asteraceae
- Genus: Chrysanthemum
- Species: C. × morifolium

Binomial name
- Chrysanthemum × morifolium (Ramat.) Hemsl.

Synonyms
- List: Anthemis × artemisifolia Willd.; Anthemis × grandiflora Ramat.; Anthemis × stipulacea Moench; Chrysanthemum × grandiflorum Tzvelv.; Chrysanthemum × hortorum W.Mill.; Chrysanthemum × indicum Thunb.; Chrysanthemum indicum var. purpureum Pers.; Chrysanthemum × maximoviczianum Ling; Chrysanthemum × morifolium Ramat.; Chrysanthemum × morifolium var. gracile Hemsl.; Chrysanthemum × morifolium f. japonense Makino; Chrysanthemum × morifolium var. sinense (Sabine) Makino; Chrysanthemum × sinense Sabine; Chrysanthemum × stipulaceum (Moench) W.Wight; Dendranthema × grandiflorum (Ramat.) Kitam.; Dendranthema × morifolium (Ramat.) Tzvelev; Dendranthema × sinense (Sabine) Des Moul.; Matricaria × morifolia Ramat.; Pyrethrum × sinense (Sabine) DC.; Tanacetum × morifolium Kitam.; Tanacetum × sinense (Sabine) Sch.Bip.

= Chrysanthemum × morifolium =

Species of plant

Chrysanthemum × morifolium (also known in the US as florist's daisy, fuji mum and hardy garden mum) is a hybrid species of perennial plant in the genus Chrysanthemum of the family Asteraceae.

== Botanical history ==
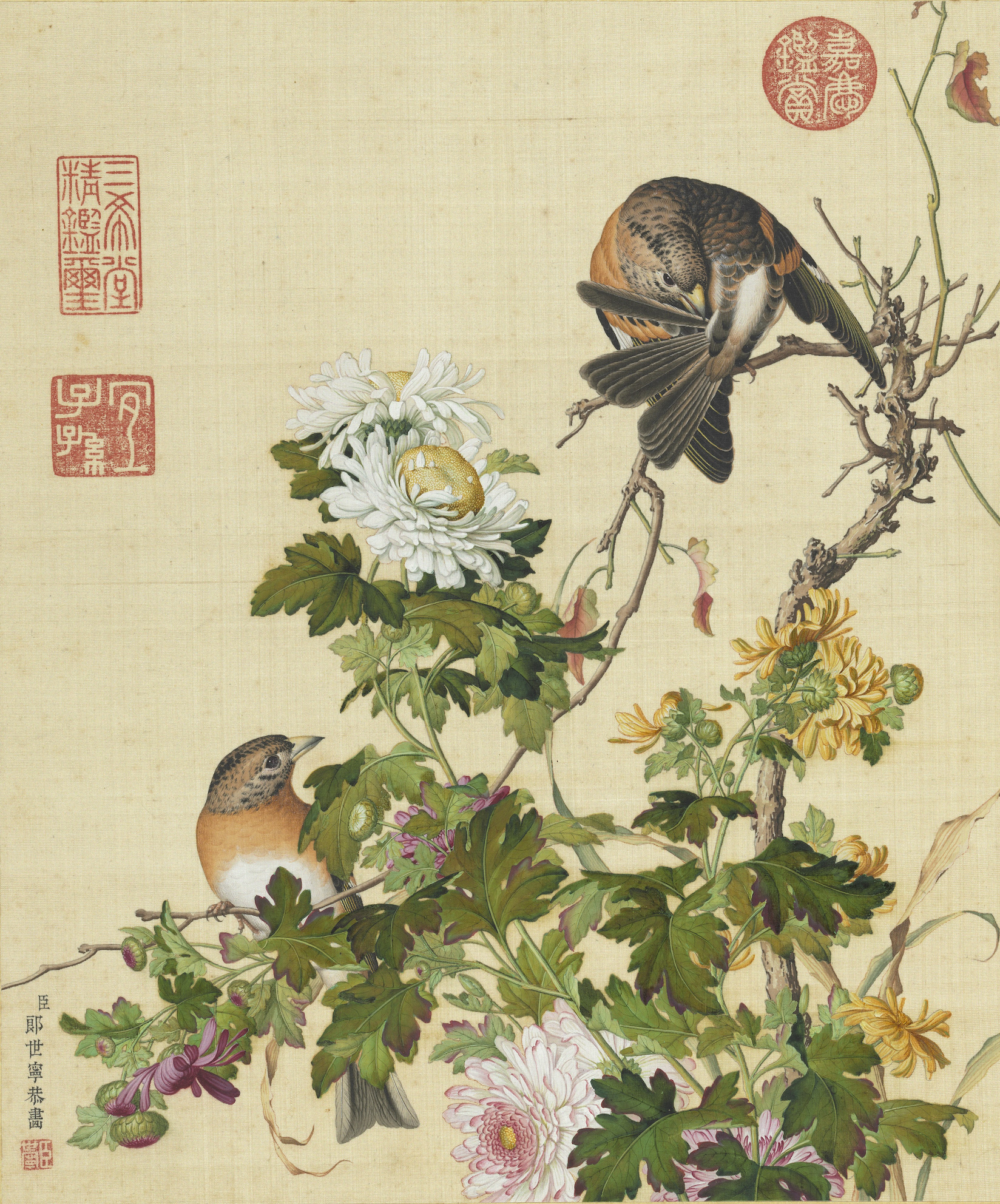
Chrysanthemums of the Immortal Blossoms in an Everlasting Spring (仙萼長春冊) by Giuseppe Castiglione (1688–1766)

In China, chrysanthemums have been described since around 500 BCE. In 1630, more than 500 varieties were already mentioned there. In Europe, especially in the Netherlands, they have been known since the mid-17th century, but their general dissemination took place only in the 19th century. The Chrysanthemum was first appreciated in China as a medicinal plant.

It is classified in the oldest Chinese medical material, Shennong Ben Cao Jing (early modern era), in the category of superior drugs and is part of the products related to the search for immortality. "In prolonged use, it lifts the inhibition of blood and qi, alleviates the body, slows down ageing, and prolongs life" says the classic. "Lightening the body" was a goal to reach the ethereal state of Immortals able to fly and "ride the clouds". From Jin and Tang dynasties (around the 5th century AD), chrysanthemum began to be appreciated as an ornamental plant, while continuing to be used for dietary reasons.

The first monograph on chrysanthemums was published in 1104 CE. Liu Meng (劉蒙), the author of a "Chrysanthemum Treatise" (菊譜), classifies the chrysanthemums according to their colors: the normal ones are yellow, then come the whites, the purples and finally the reds. It lists a total of 35 cultivated varieties that could be observed in the gardens near the Buddhist shrines of Longmen Grottoes. In the 16th century, the famous physician and herbalist Li Shizhen in his Great Treaty of Medical Matter, reports a hundred cultivars. He attributes to them some medicinal properties such as "eliminating heat and toxins", "improving visual acuity" and so on. In 1630, a survey of over 500 cultivars 17 and about 2000 at the beginning of 20th century.

The first European author to mention chrysanthemum is Jacobus Breynius (Jacob Breyn) in 1689 in his Prodromus Plantarum Rariorum. This merchant and botanist describes the Matricaria japonica maxima, as a very elegant flowering plant, double, pink or light red 20 and existing in several varieties. The first botanical description of the florists' chrysanthemum goes to Thomas d'Audibert de Ramatuelle. In 1792, in the Journal of Natural History, this botanist describes the cultivated plant, with big purpurine flowers, brought back from China by the navigator Marseillais Blancard, under the names of "Camomile with large flowers", Anthemis grandiflora. He insists on distinguishing it from the Chrysanthemum indicum of Linnaeus with small yellow heads. He proposes in a note to call it also Chrysanthemum morifolium. From this first cultivated plant brought back from China in 1789 by Blancard, then from those brought back (from China in 1846 and Japan in 1863) will be created in Europe thousands of cultivars and hybrids. Joining thousands of cultivars developed independently in China and Japan, there is currently a huge complex of cultivars (estimated from 20,000 to 30,000).

Horticulturalist Wilhelm Miller wrote, "The common chrysanthemums of the florists (C. hortorum) are often called 'large-flowering' and 'autumn chrysanthemums,' to distinguish them from the hardy outdoor species. They are the blended product of C. indicum and C. morifolium, two species of plants that grow wild in China and Japan. The outdoor or hardy chrysanthemums are derived from the same species, being less developed forms. The florist's chrysanthemum is not necessarily a glasshouse subject."

The more than 1,000 varieties that have existed in Europe since the 19th century are divided into numerous varieties. The indicum hybrids as the oldest group have the chrysanthemum chrysanthemum (Chrysanthemum indicum) as the parent.

== Description ==
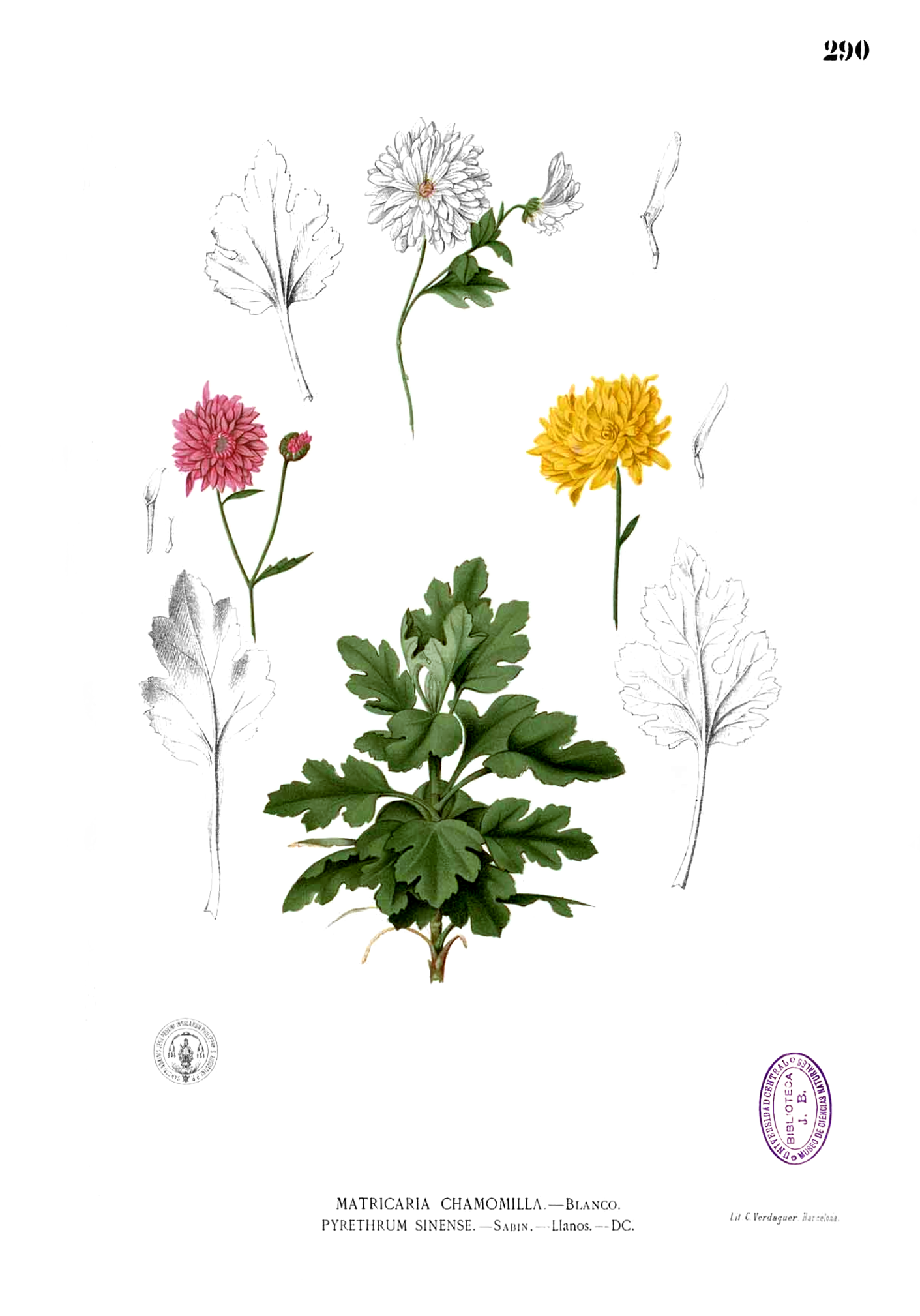
Varieties and cultivars

The plant is 30–90 centimetres (12–35 in) high and wide, which grows as a perennial herbaceous or slightly woody plant on the ground. The stems stand upright. The leaves are broad ovate in outline and wedge-shaped in the petiole, the length of the leaves is more than 150 mm (6 in). The lower leaves are plumed, further up the stems they are increasingly entire. Deciduous leaves appear in the spring. They are alternate, lobed pinnatifid and toothed. They are up to 12 cm long, fleshy and covered with gray hairs. They exhale a strong smell when they are wrinkled.

The plant's texture is thick and leathery. The many branches, which are silky and covered with a short down, form a dense tuft. The typical flower heads are radiated, that is to say formed of peripheral florets, female, zygomorphous, with ligules and central florets actinomorphous, tubulated, bisexual. The external bracts are herbaceous, with a narrow margin.

In complex total inflorescences are some to many cup-shaped partial inflorescences together. The tongue flowers can have in the many varieties of colors of green, white, or yellow, pink to purple. There are varieties with simple flowers that look like daisies and varieties with double flowers, looking like pompoms more or less big. The plant starts to bloom when the length of the day is less than 14 hours.

During the millennium and a half of cultivation, tens of thousands of different cultivars have been obtained, with flower heads of very different shapes, sizes and colors. Leaves are generally used for chrysanthemum identification.

=== Classification ===
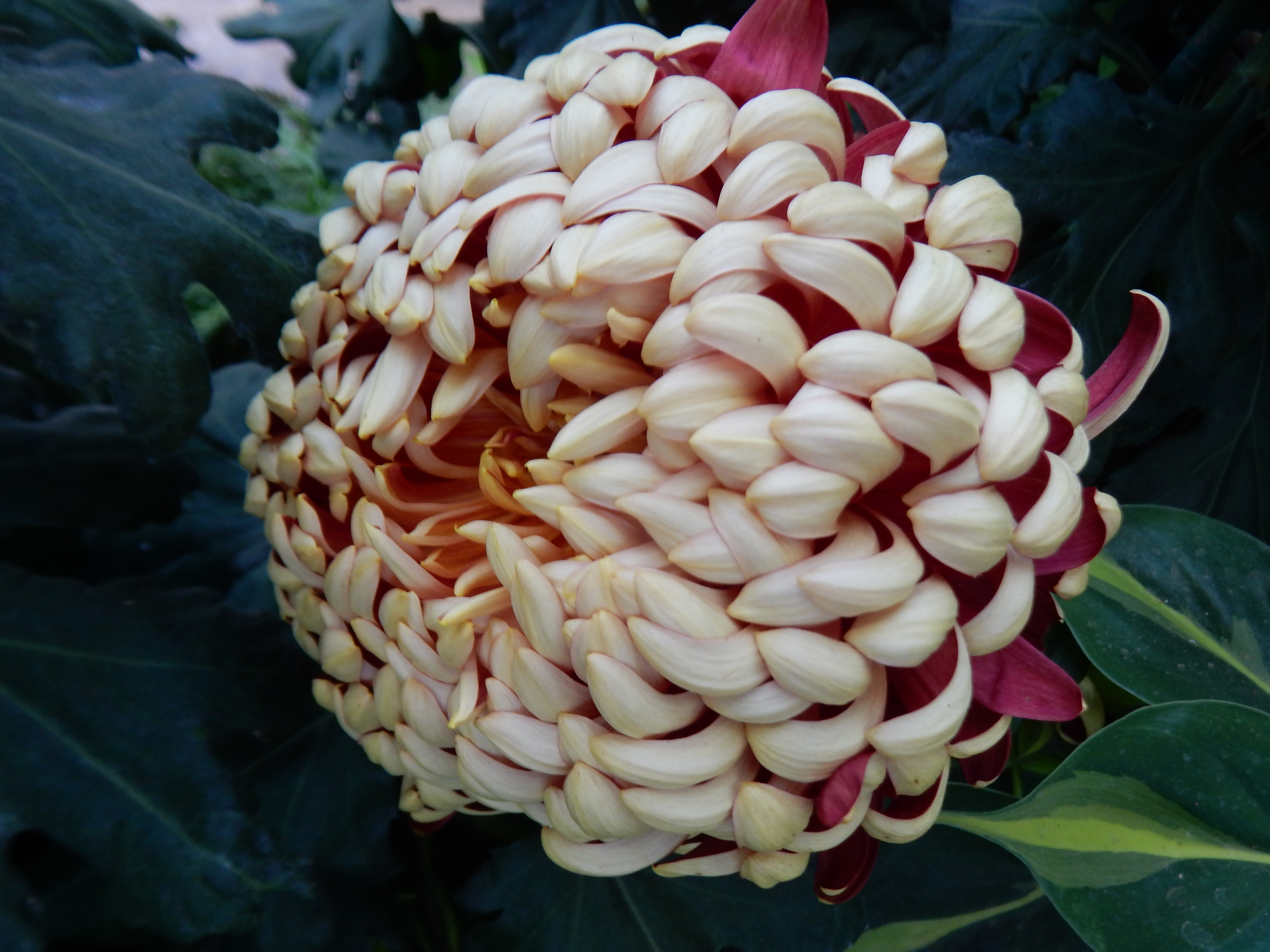
Irregular incurve (ogiku), "Crimson Tide"

In North America, chrysanthemums are divided into two basic groups, garden hardy and exhibition. Garden hardy chrysanthemums are perennials capable of wintering in most American northern latitudes. In theory C. × morifolium is hardy to USDA zones 5–9. Exhibition varieties are not usually as hardy. Garden hardy varieties are defined by their ability to produce an abundance of small blooms with little if any mechanical assistance, such as staking, and withstanding wind and rain. Exhibition varieties, though, require staking, overwintering in a relatively dry, cool environment, and sometimes the addition of night lights.

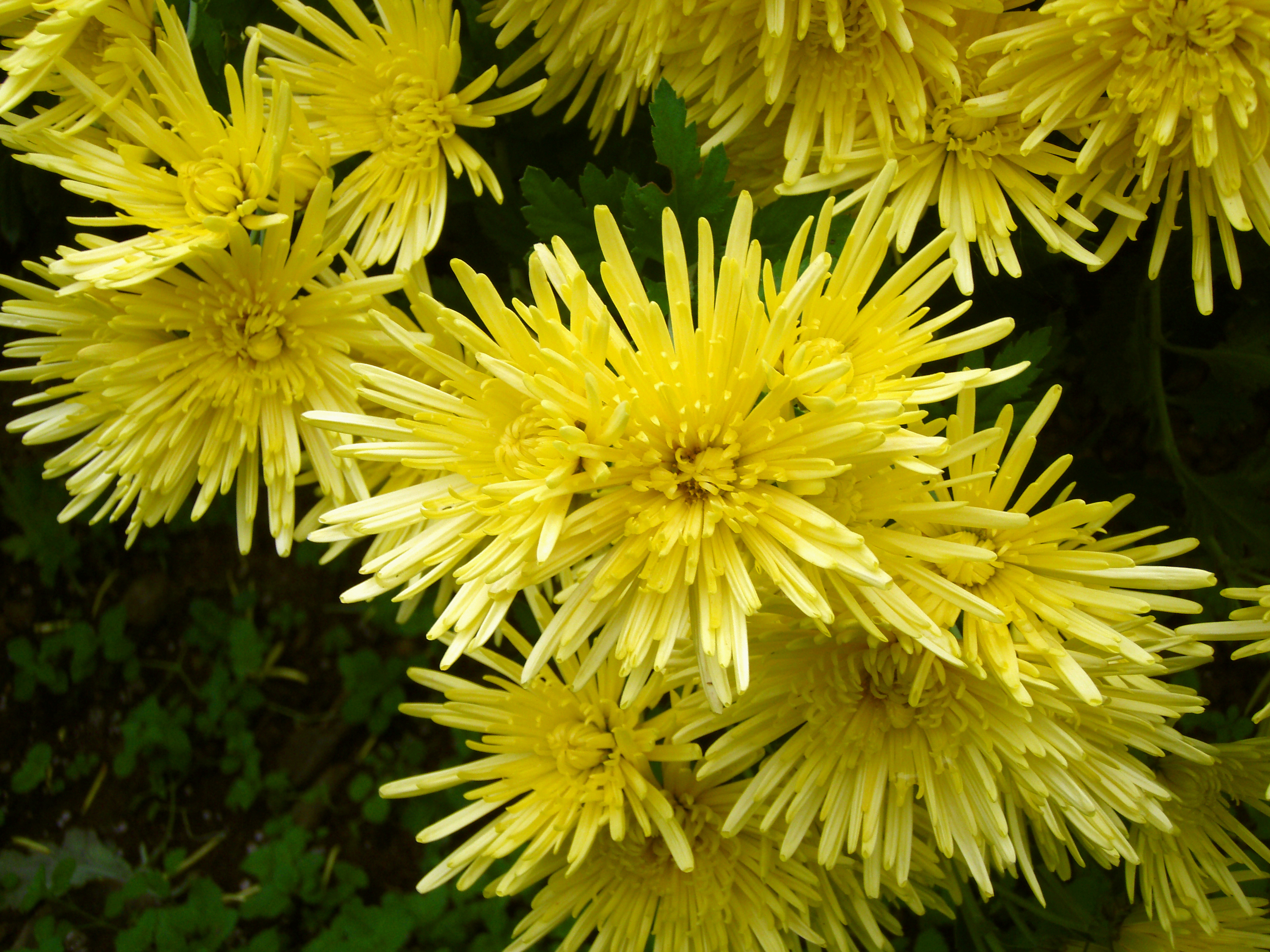
Spiky

The exhibition varieties can be used to create many amazing plant forms, such as large disbudded blooms, spray forms, and many artistically trained forms, such as thousand-bloom, standard (trees), fans, hanging baskets, topiary, bonsai, and cascades.

Chrysanthemum blooms are divided into 13 different bloom forms by the US National Chrysanthemum Society, Inc., which is in keeping with the international classification system. The bloom forms are defined by the way in which the ray and disk florets are arranged. Chrysanthemum blooms are composed of many individual flowers (florets), each one capable of producing a seed. The disk florets are in the center of the bloom head, and the ray florets are on the perimeter. The ray florets are considered imperfect flowers, as they only possess the female reproductive organs, while the disk florets are considered perfect flowers, as they possess both male and female reproductive organs.

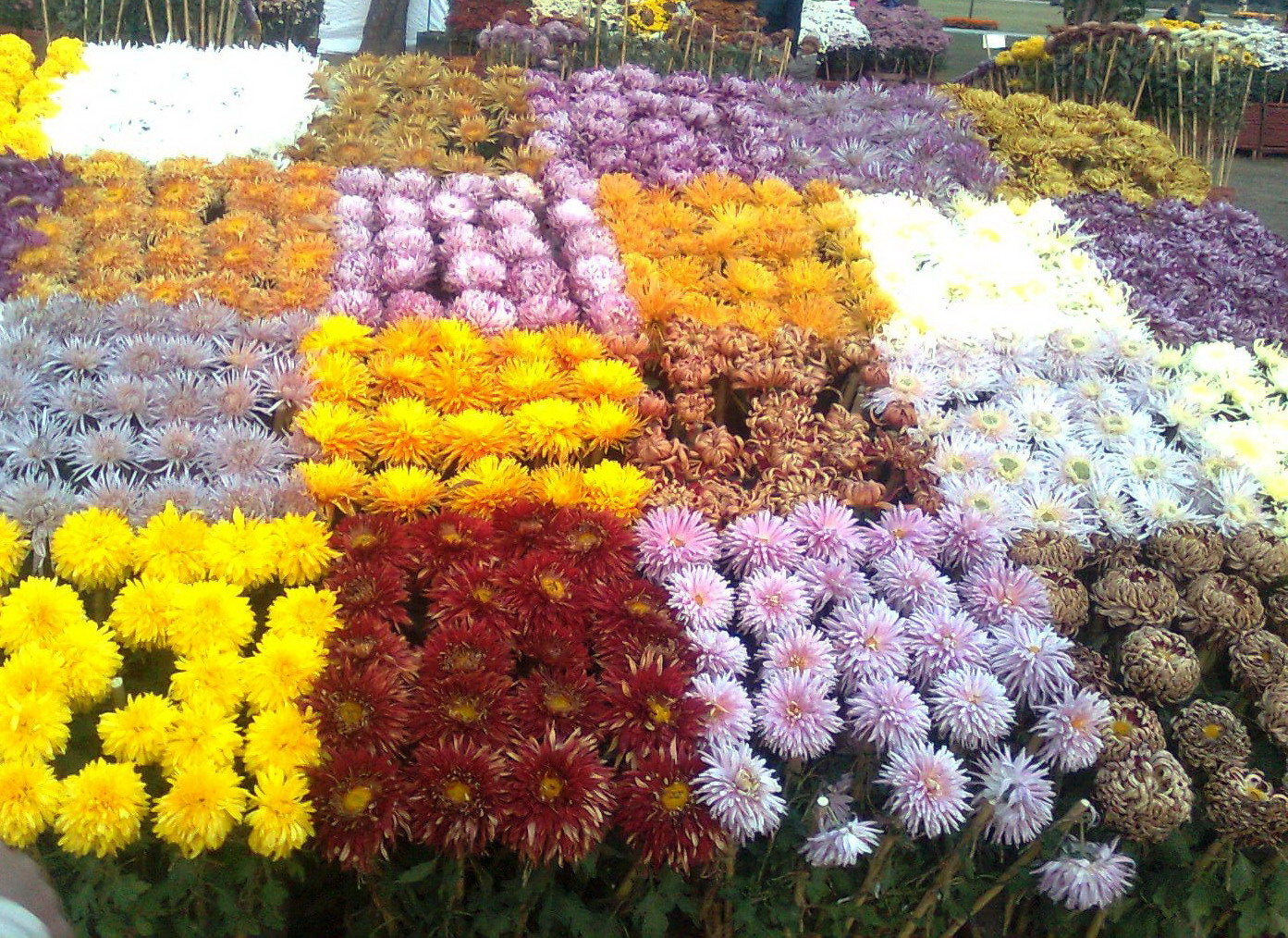
Display in Pakistan

Irregular incurves are bred to produce (with much disbudding) a single giant head called an ogiku. The disk florets are concealed in layers of curving ray florets that hang down to create a 'skirt'. Regular incurves are similar, but usually with smaller blooms and a dense, globular form. Intermediate incurve blooms may have broader florets and a less densely flowered head.

In the reflex form, the disk florets are concealed and the ray florets reflex outwards to create a mop-like appearance. The decorative form is similar to reflex blooms, but the ray florets usually do not radiate at more than a 90° angle to the stem.

The pompon form is fully double, of small size, and very globular in form. Single and semidouble blooms have exposed disk florets and one to seven rows of ray florets. In the anemone form, the disk florets are prominent, often raised and overshadowing the ray florets. The spoon-form disk florets are visible and the long, tubular ray florets are spatulate. In the spider form, the disk florets are concealed, and the ray florets are tube-like with hooked or barbed ends, hanging loosely around the stem. In the brush and thistle variety, the disk florets may be visible.

== Cultivation and uses ==
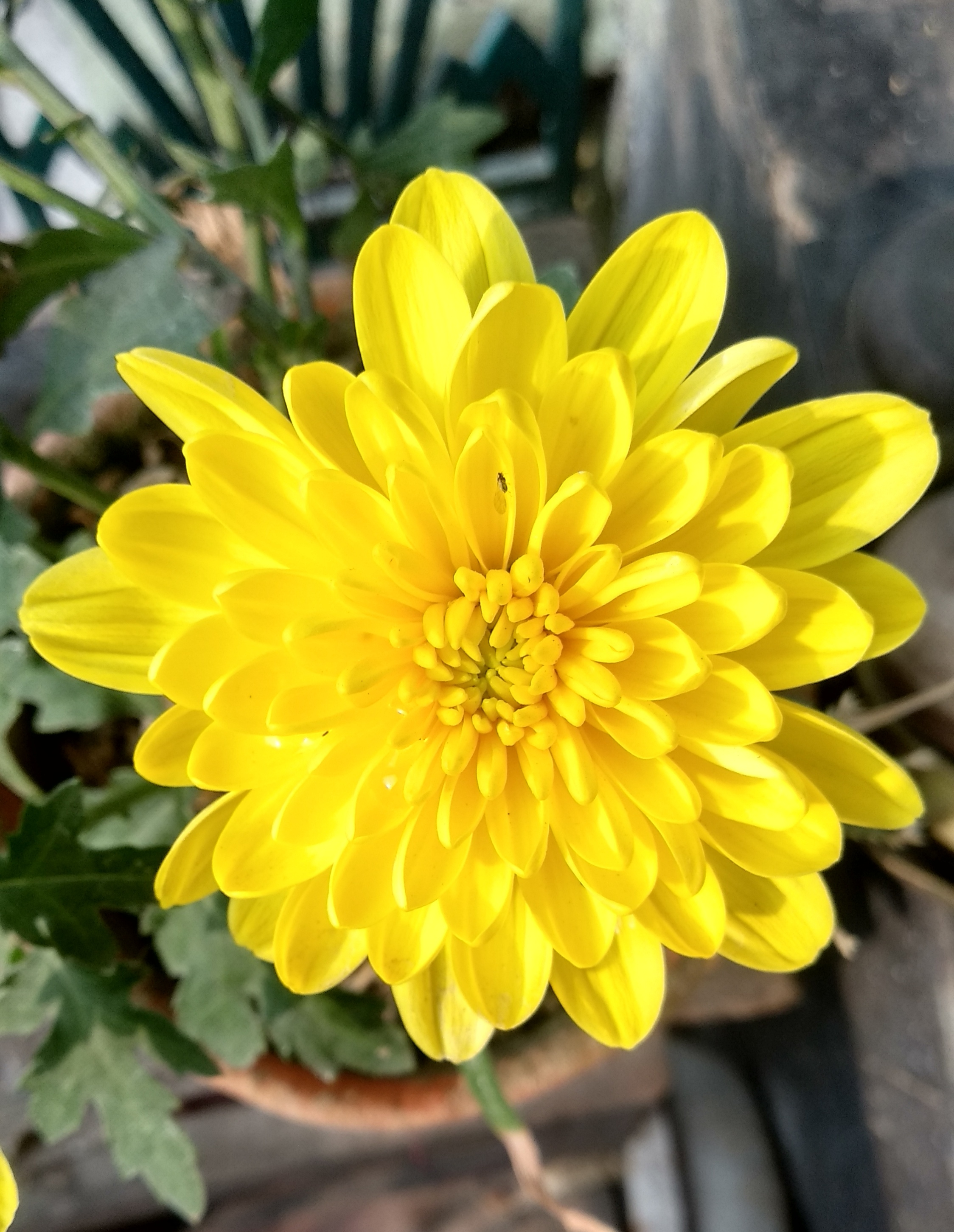
A yellow coloured florist's daisy, photographed in West Bengal, India.

This plant can be noted for its popularity as an indoor houseplant in part because of its air cleaning qualities as per a study done by NASA, removing trichloroethylene, benzene, formaldehyde, ammonia, and other chemicals from the air. In general, the plant is best fertilized once a month and watered two to three times a week depending on climate. To maintain cultivar uniformity, the most common method of propagation is by cuttings. However, this method is increasingly being replaced by micropropagation, also known as in vitro propagation. Good results are achieved using single node shoot fragments.

In terms of stems produced commercially per year in 1997, Japan was by far the largest producer with 2 billion stalks, followed by the Netherlands (800 million), Colombia (600 million), Italy (500 million).

=== Thousand Bloom Chrysanthemum ===
In a traditional technique known as Ozukuri, a single "Thousand Bloom Chrysanthemum" plant is carefully grown and trained over an extended period to have a single bloom on the end of each branch. For example, in 2020 Longwood Gardens featured a Thousand Bloom Chrysanthemum with 1,362 sunny yellow, uniform Chrysanthemum × morifolium 'Susono-no-Hikari' blossoms as part of its annual Chrysanthemum Festival. Growth and training of the plant took 17 months and over 2,000 staff hours. The plant reached a size of 12 feet wide and 8 feet tall.

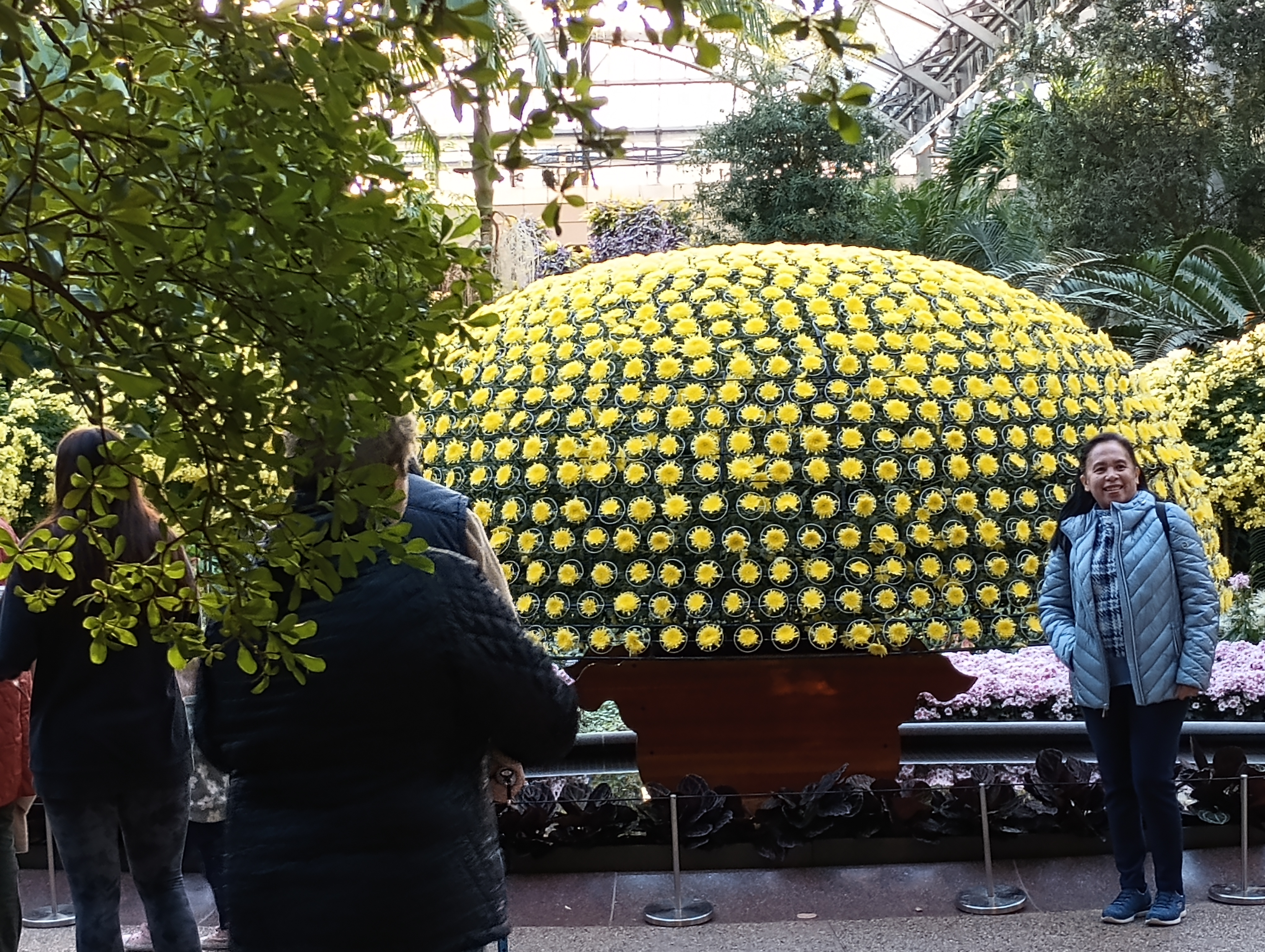
Thousand Bloom Chrysanthemum, Longwood Gardens, 2025 (including some plants (e.g. Black olive, Wood's cycad))

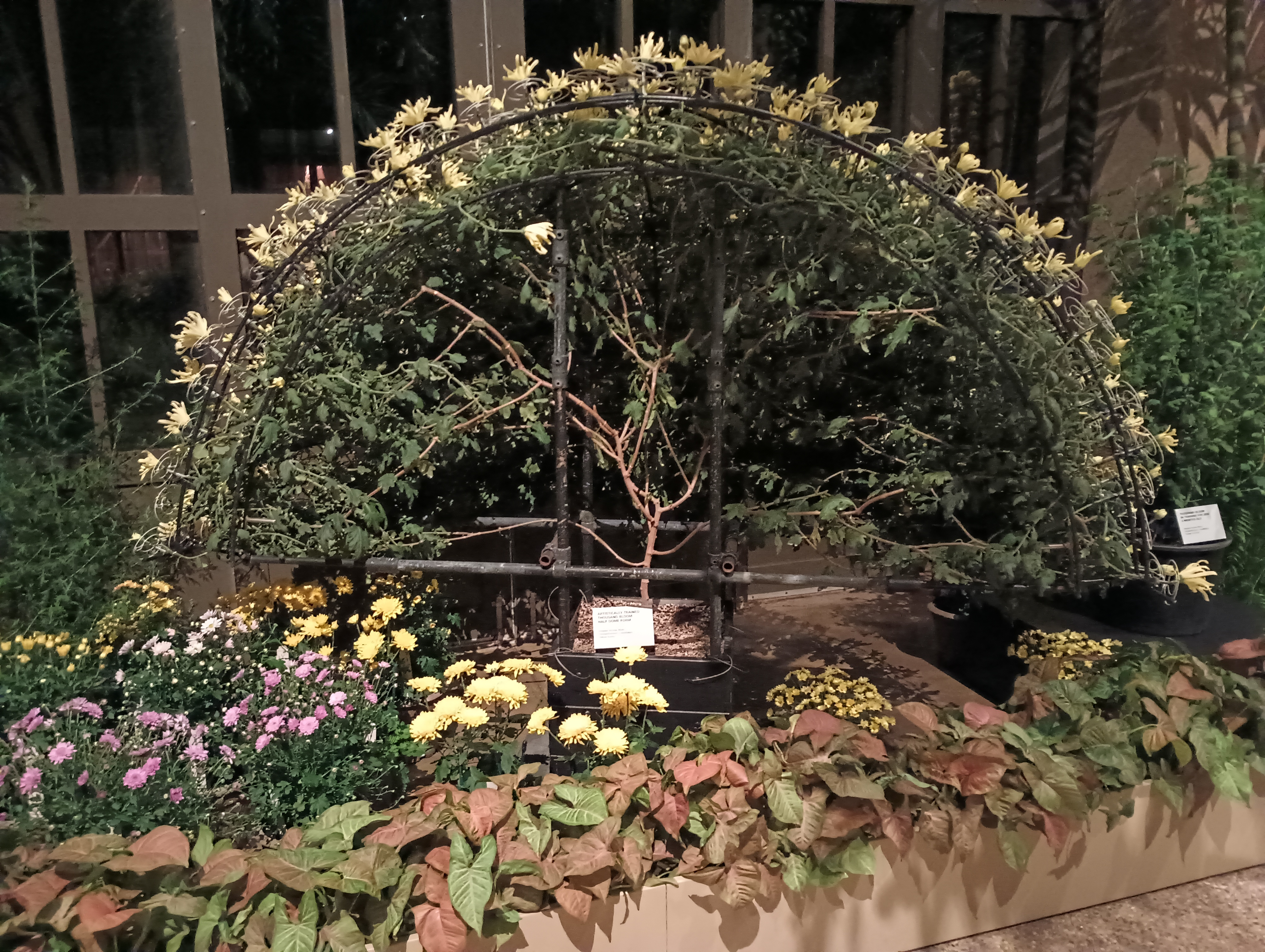
Half trellis showing interior

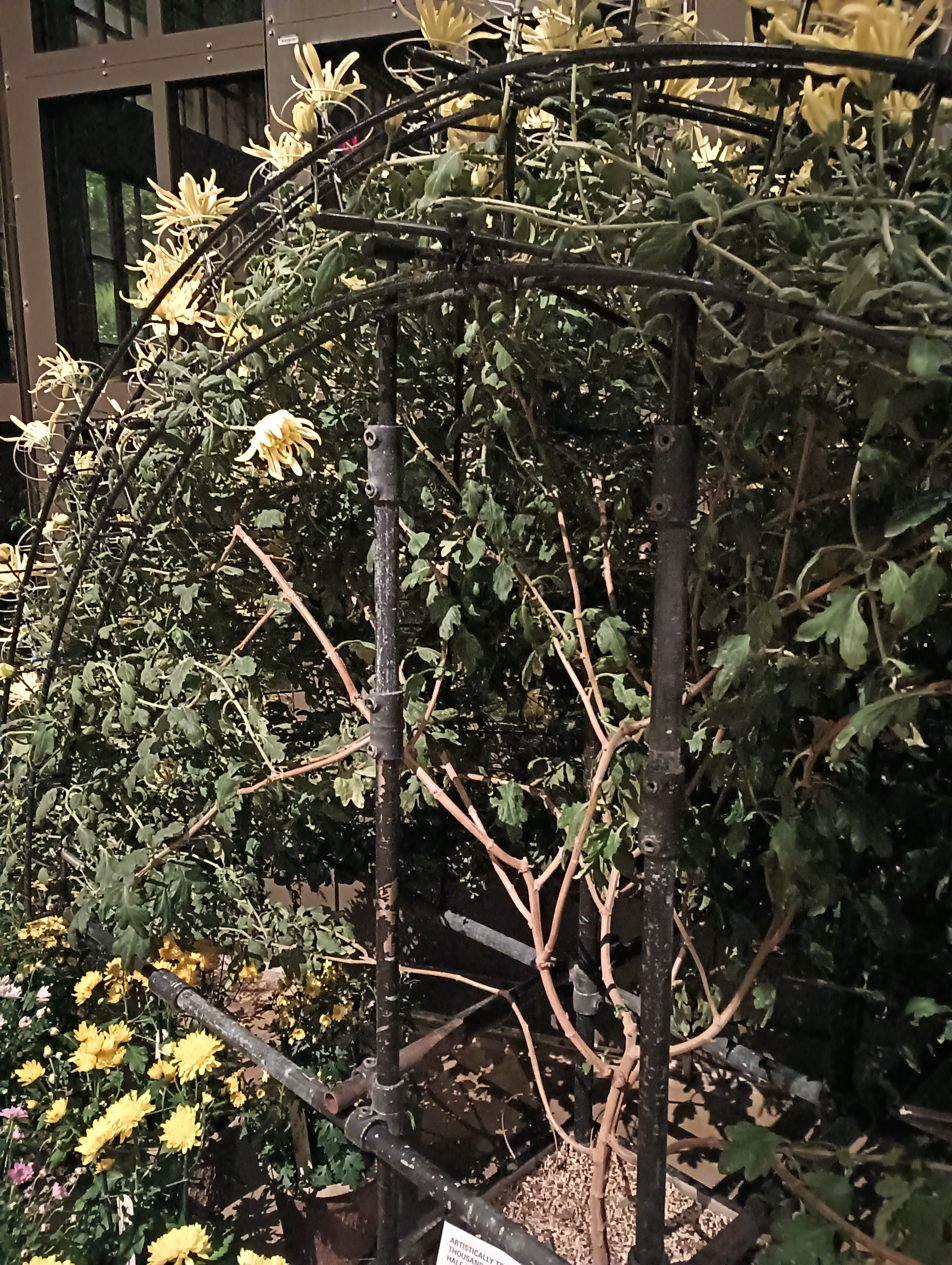
Closeup of half trellis

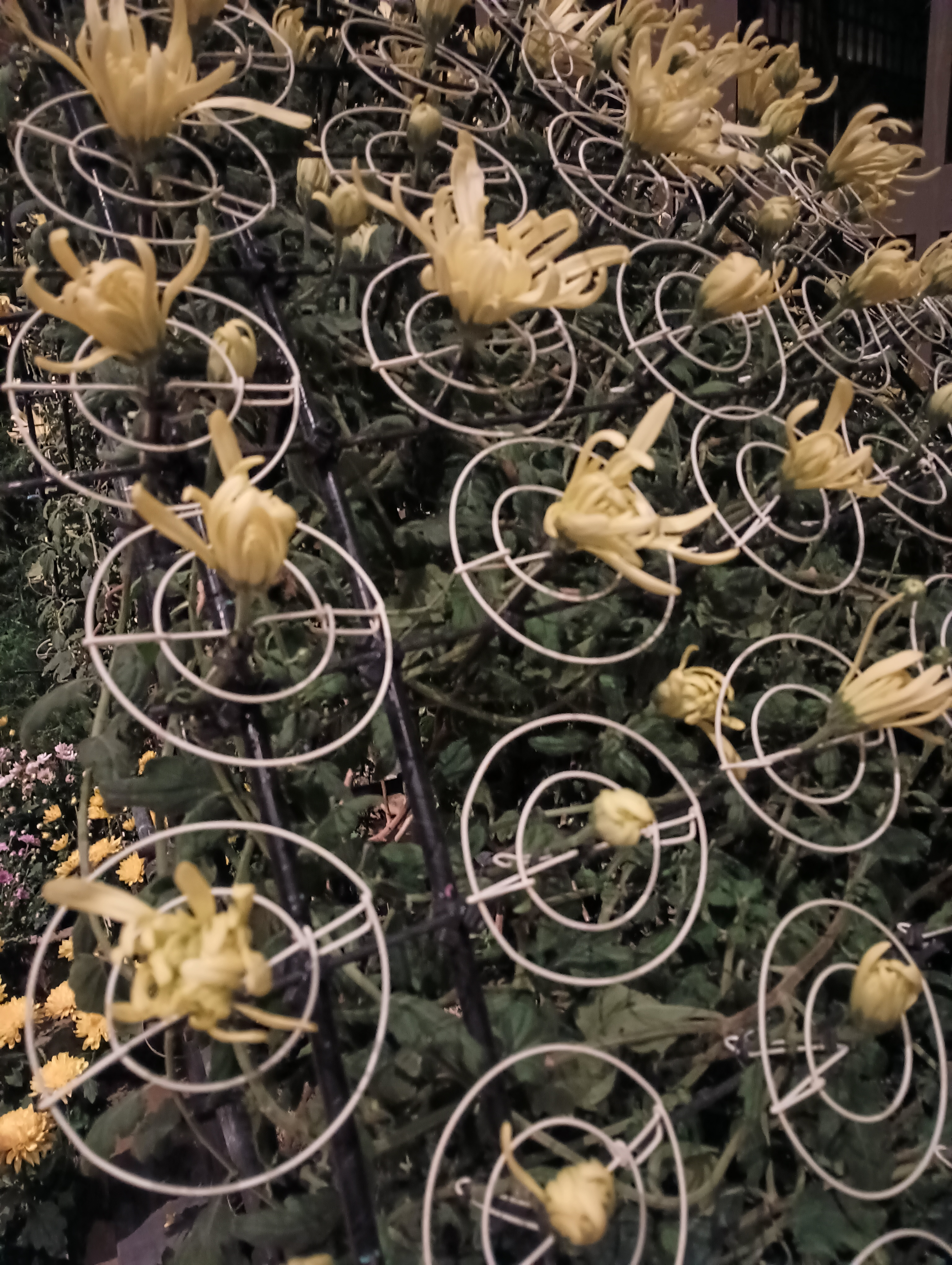
Closeup of blooms

=== Medicine ===
In natural medicine the "flower" is used against eye inflammation and impure skin. It also applies as an air purifier.

Contact with parts of plants may in some cases cause skin irritation and allergies.

== Ecology ==
The plant is eaten by various aphids, capsid bugs, earwigs, leaf miners, nematodes, spider mites, thrips, and whiteflies. The plant can die from various diseases which include aster yellows, Botrytis, leaf spots, rust, powdery mildew, verticillium wilt, and rotting of stem and roots, and even viruses.

== Biotechnology ==
Biotechnology of chrysanthemum encompasses advanced techniques such as micropropagation, mutation breeding, cryopreservation, and the application of nanoparticles. Micropropagation allows for the rapid multiplication of chrysanthemum plants from small tissue samples, ensuring the production of large numbers of uniform and disease-free plants. Mutation breeding, involving the use of chemicals or radiation to induce genetic variations, helps in developing new chrysanthemum cultivars with desirable traits such as improved flower color, size, and resistance to diseases. Cryopreservation offers a method to conserve chrysanthemum germplasm at ultra-low temperatures, enabling the long-term storage of genetic resources without losing viability. Additionally, nanoparticles are being explored to create new cultivars. Together, these biotechnological approaches contribute significantly to the genetic improvement, conservation, and sustainable production of chrysanthemums.

== Gallery ==
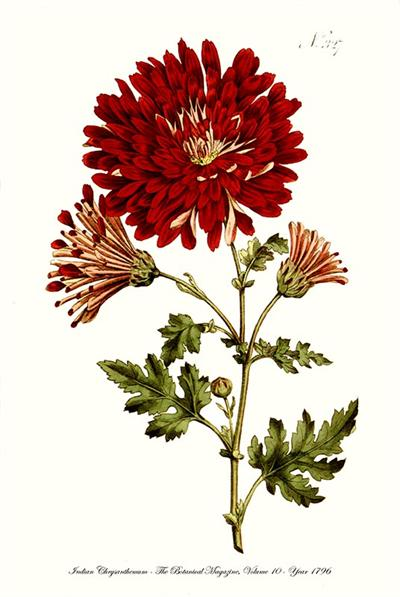
Botanical illustration

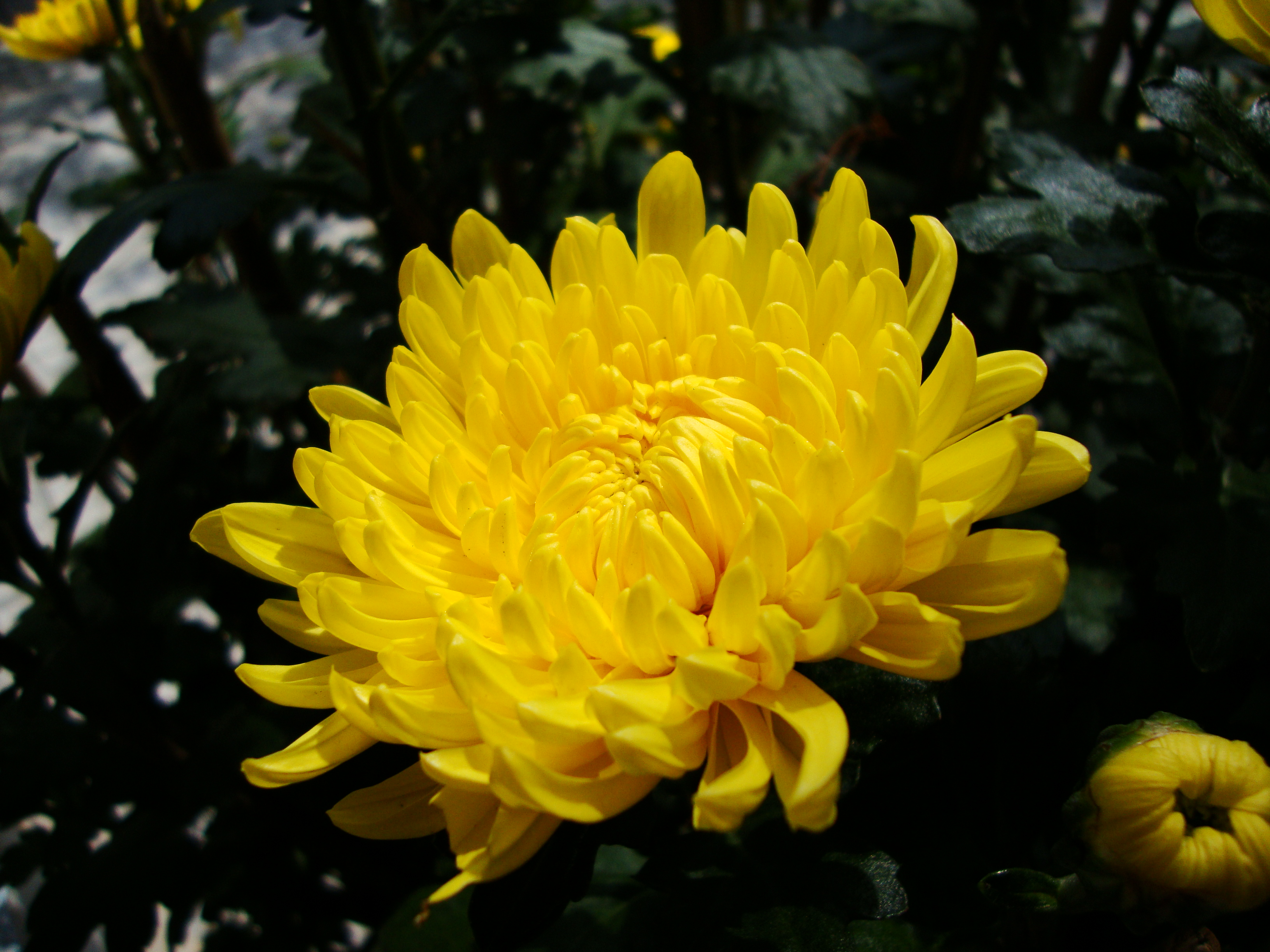

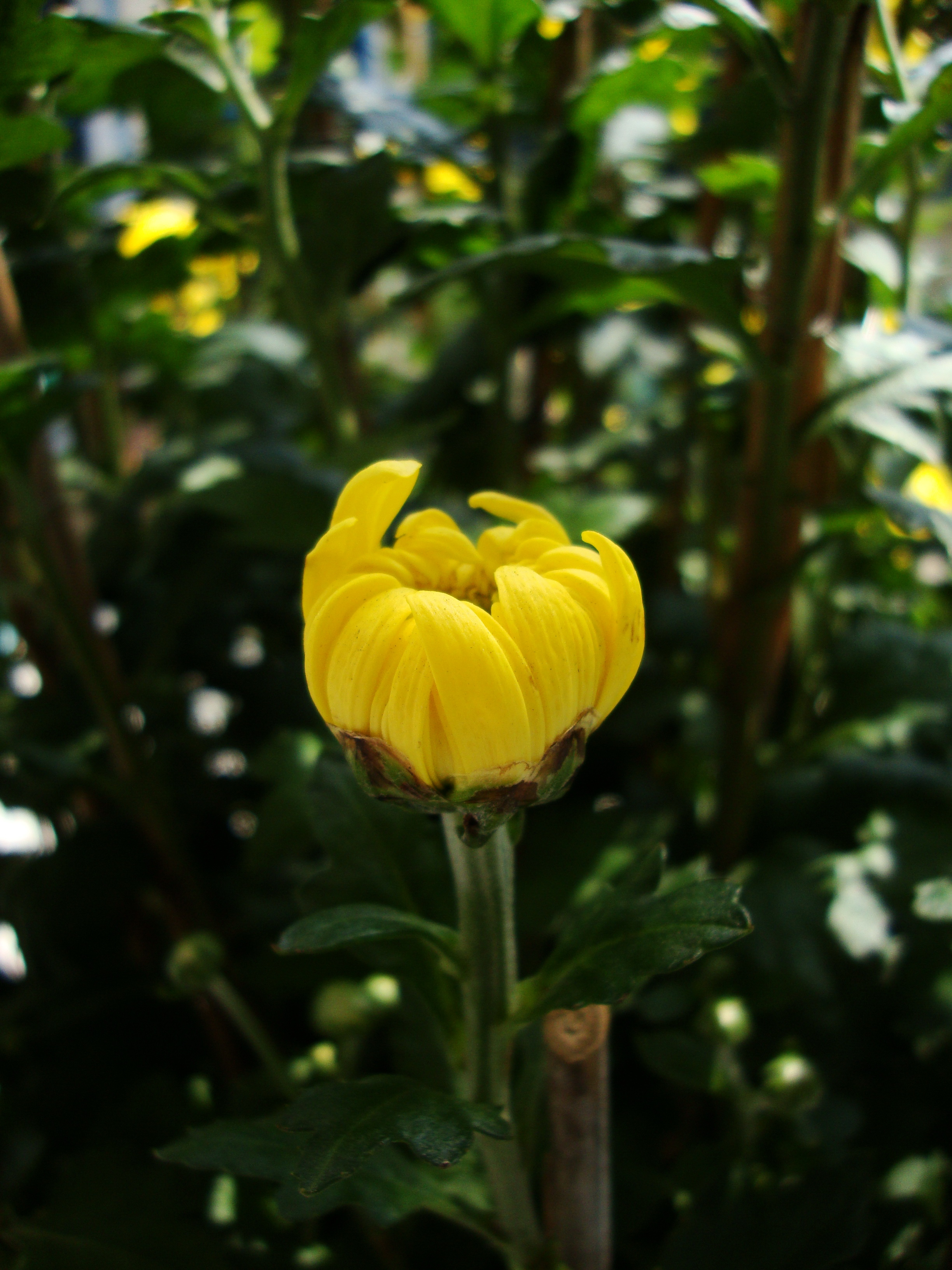

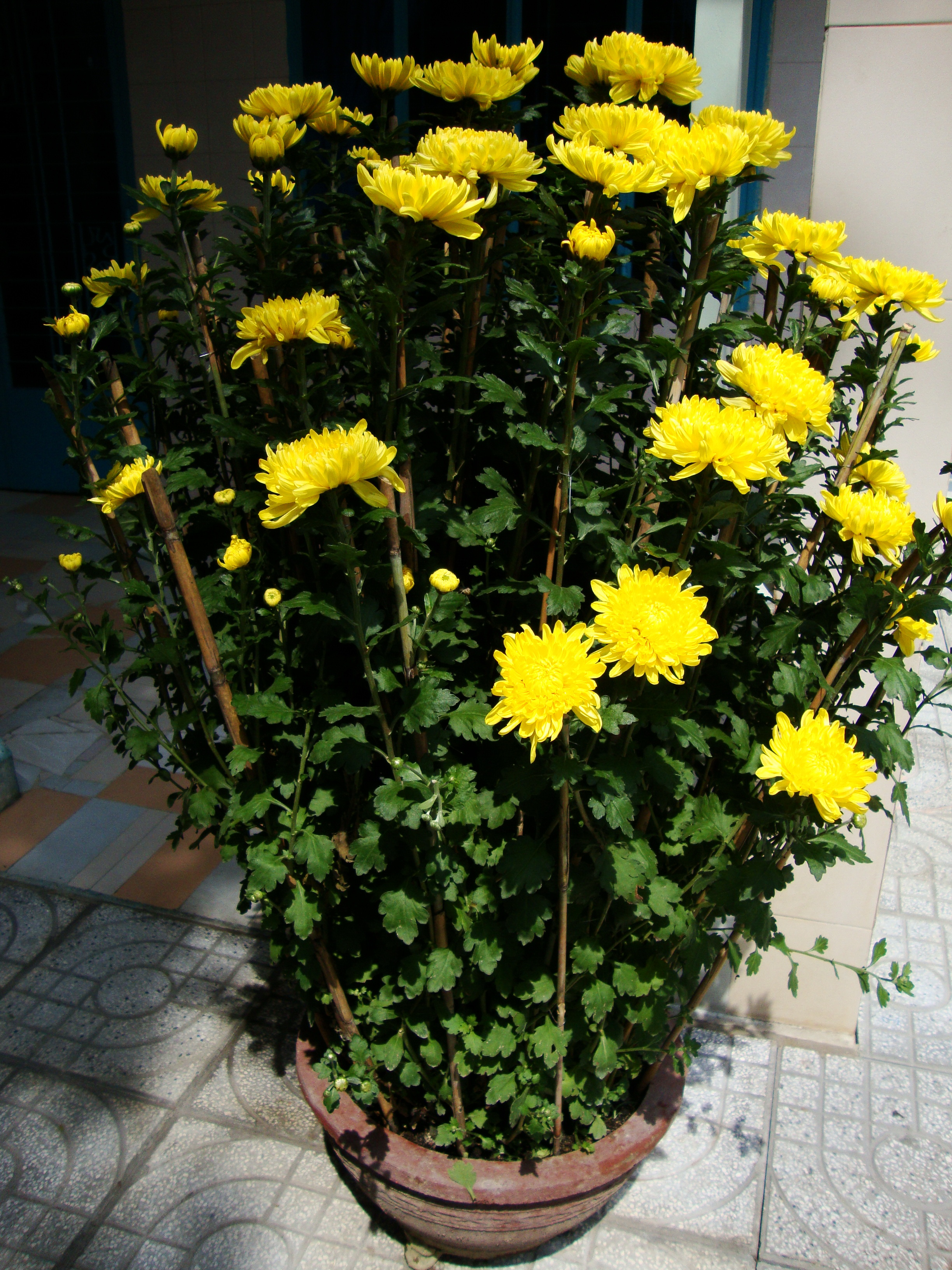

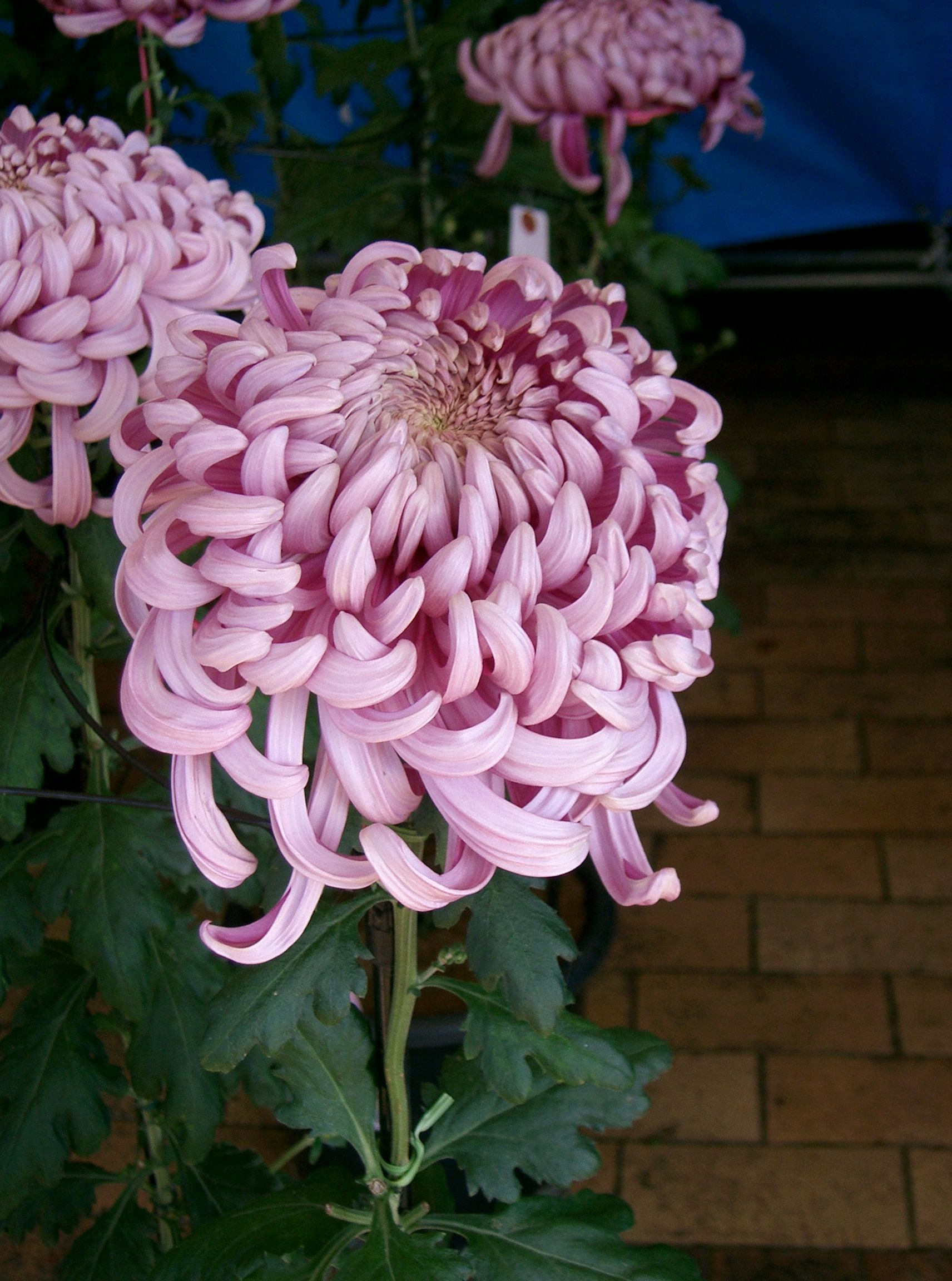

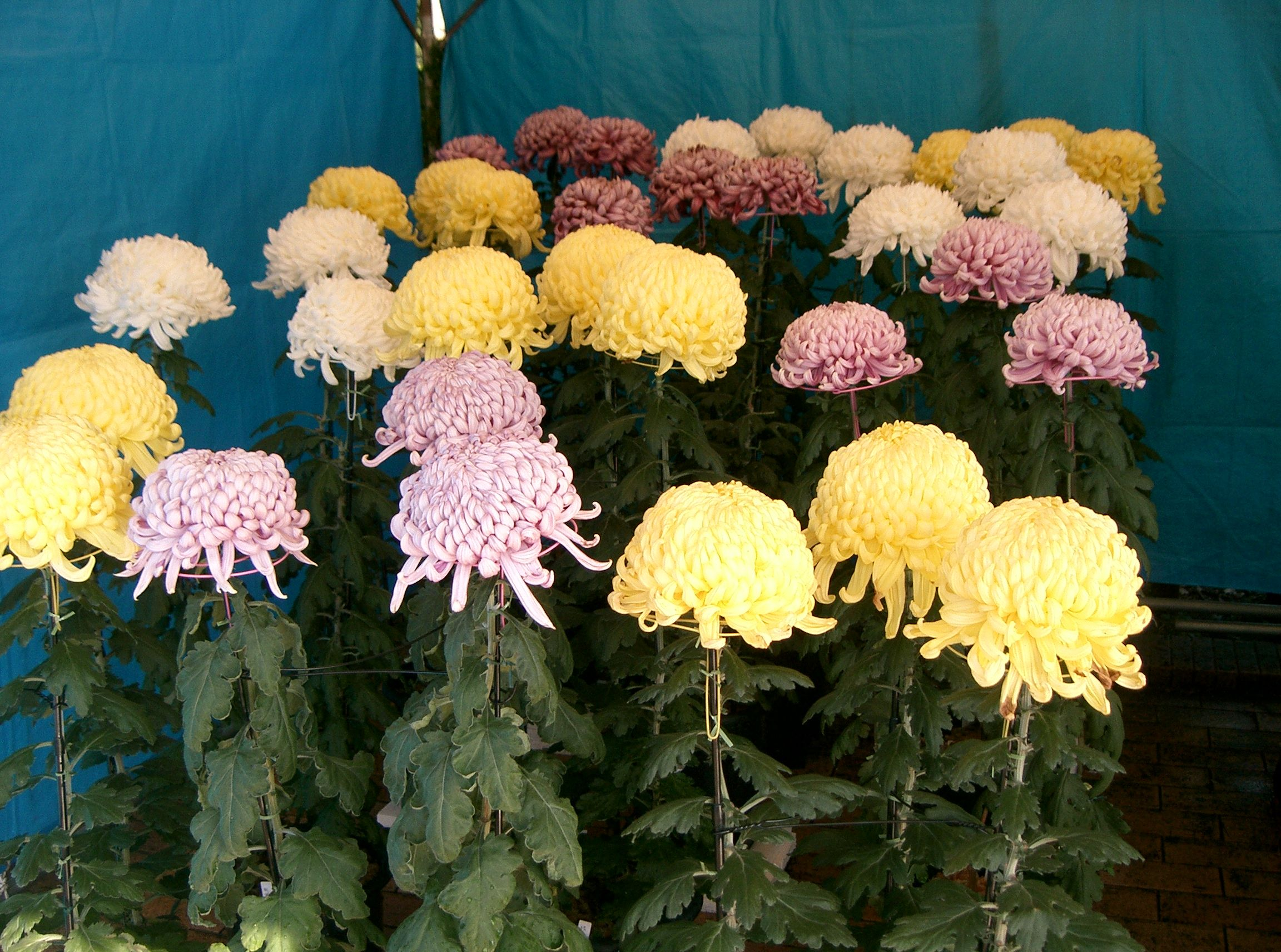

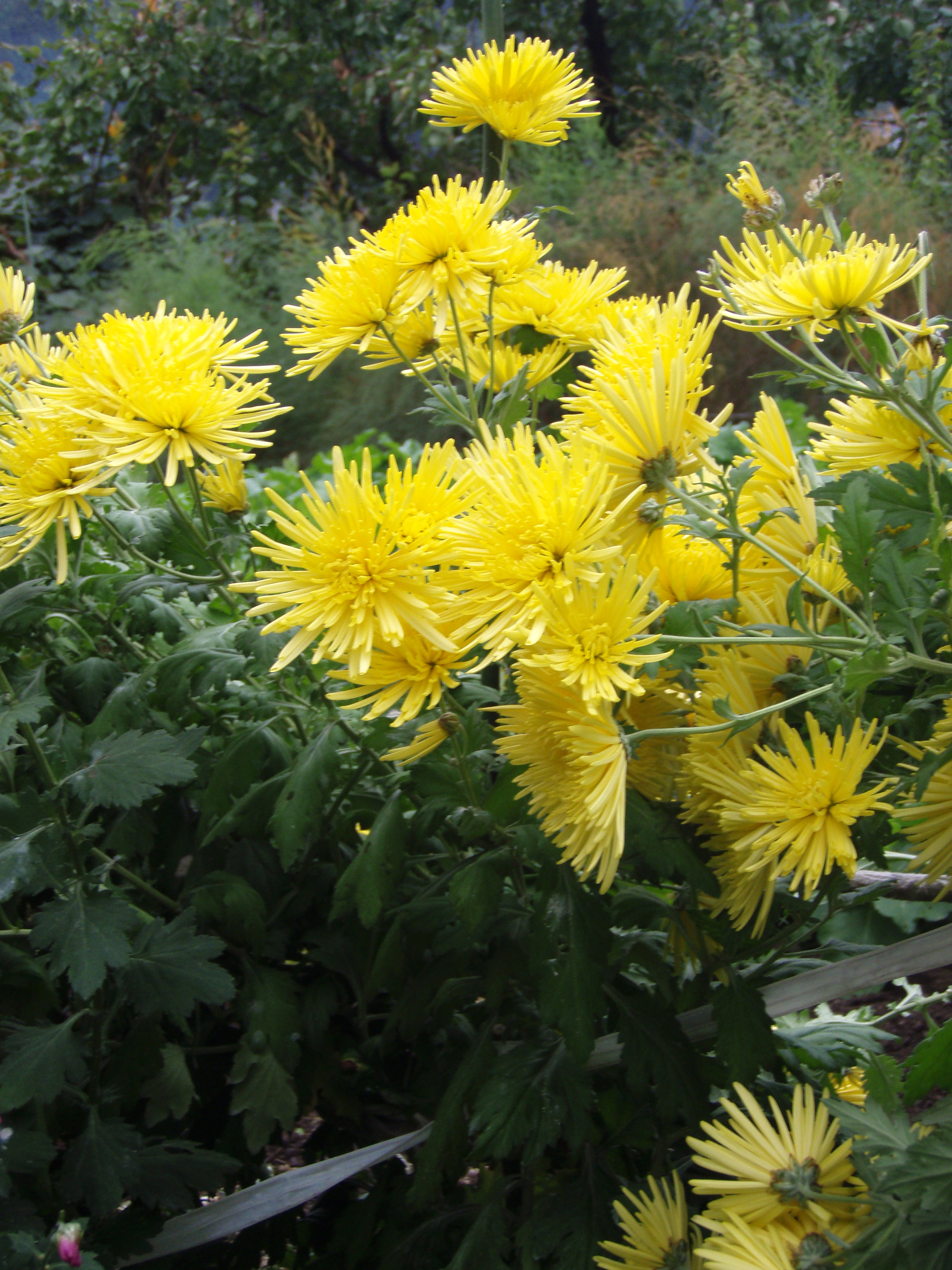

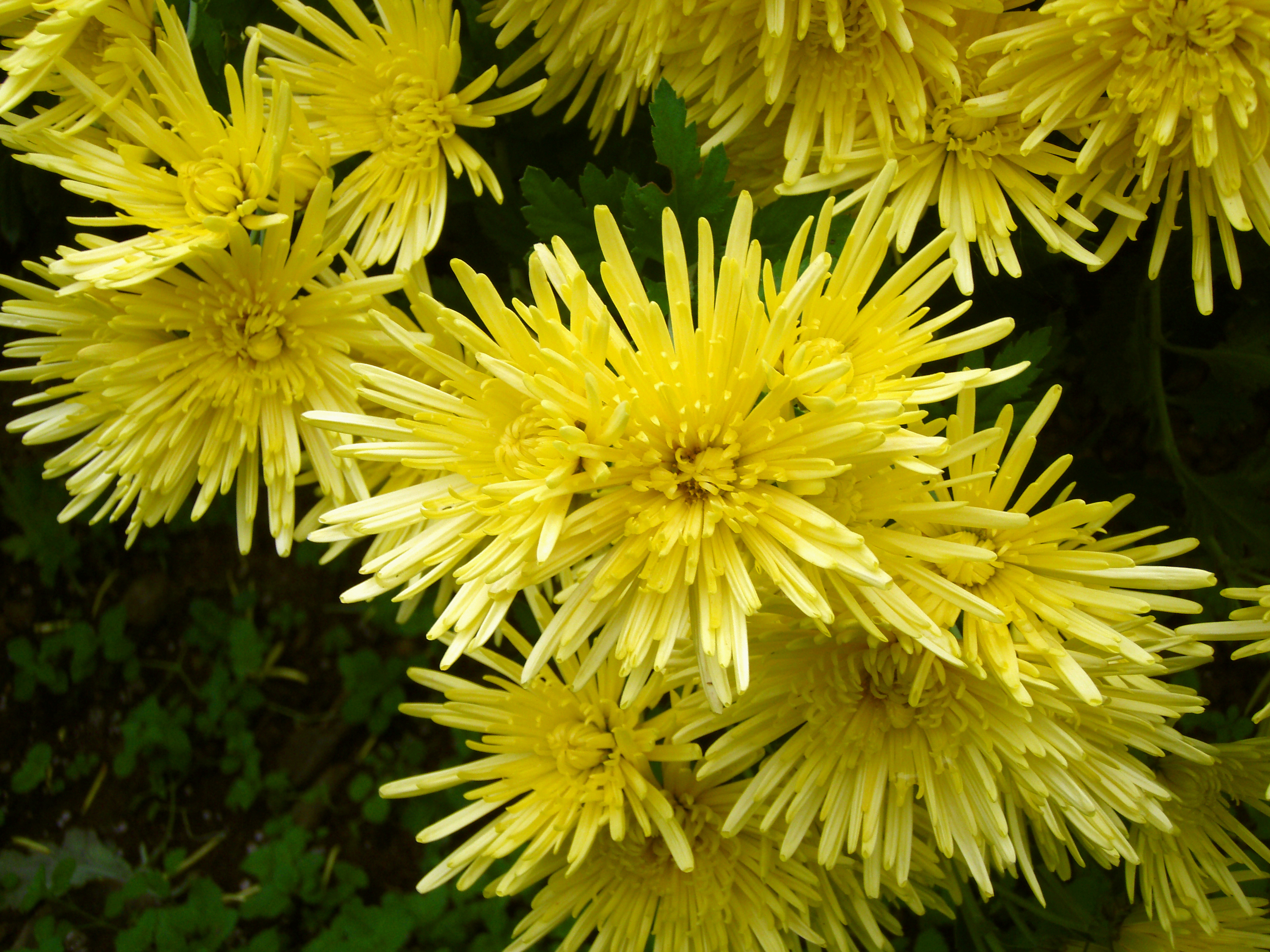

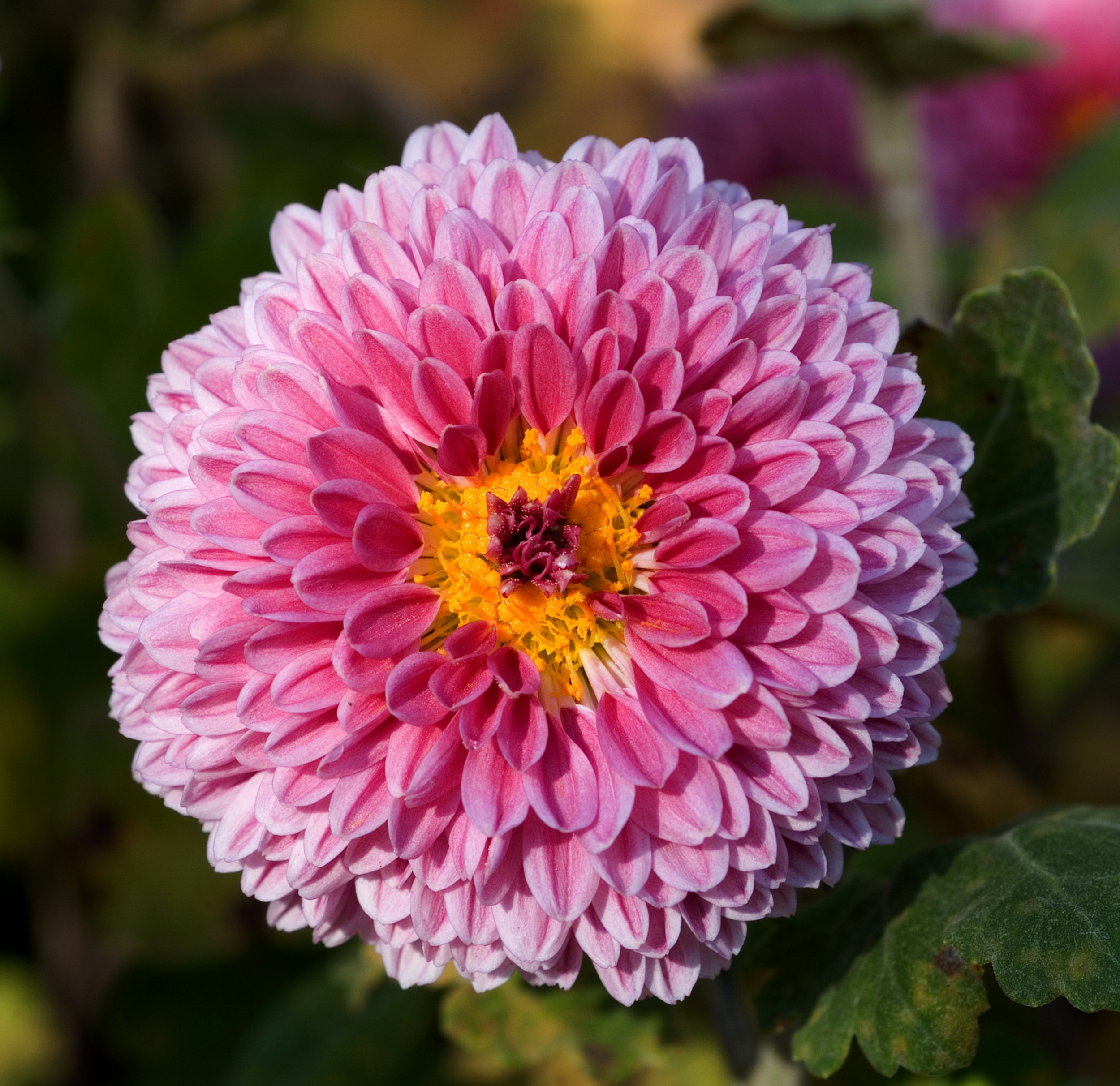

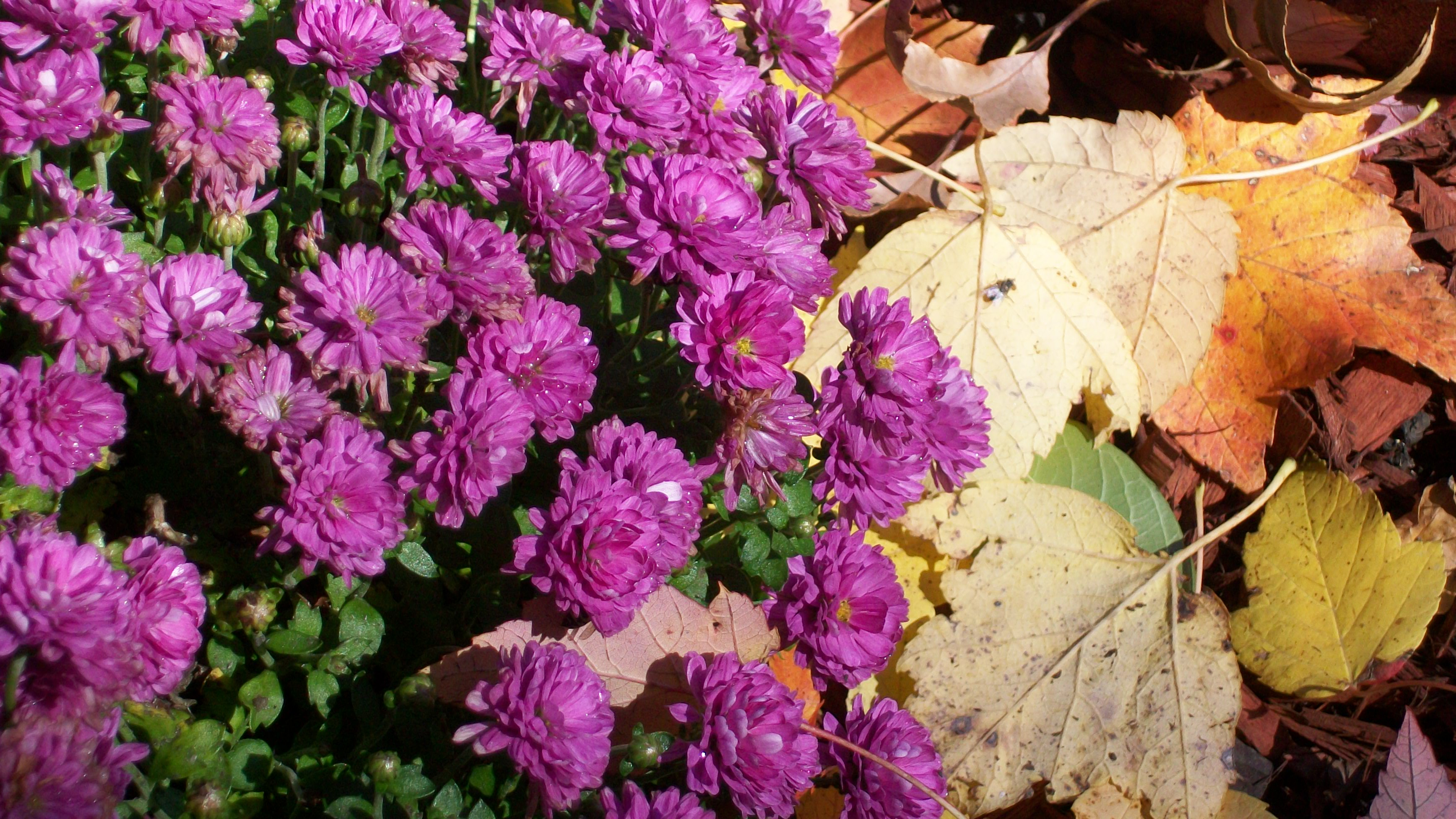

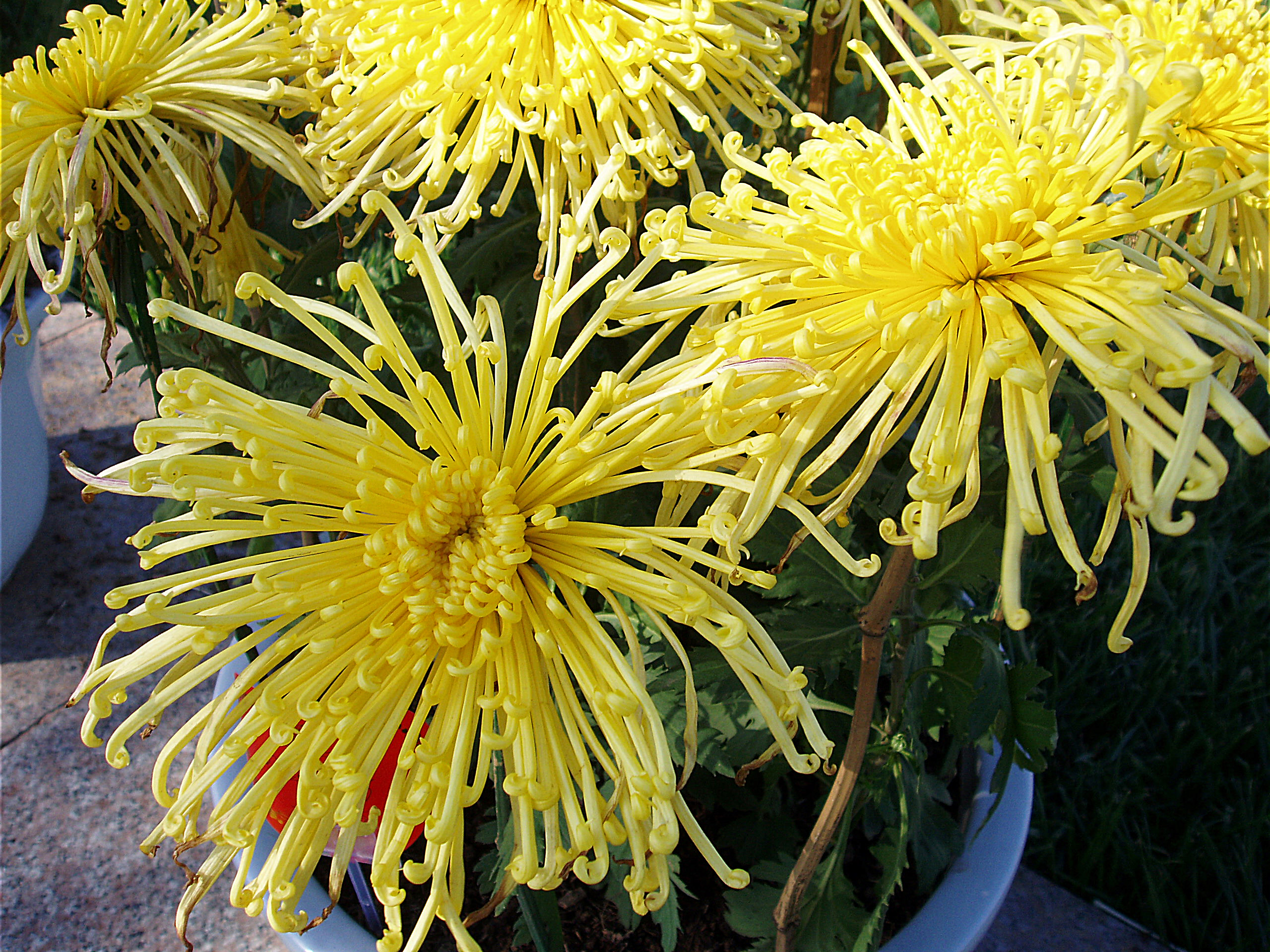

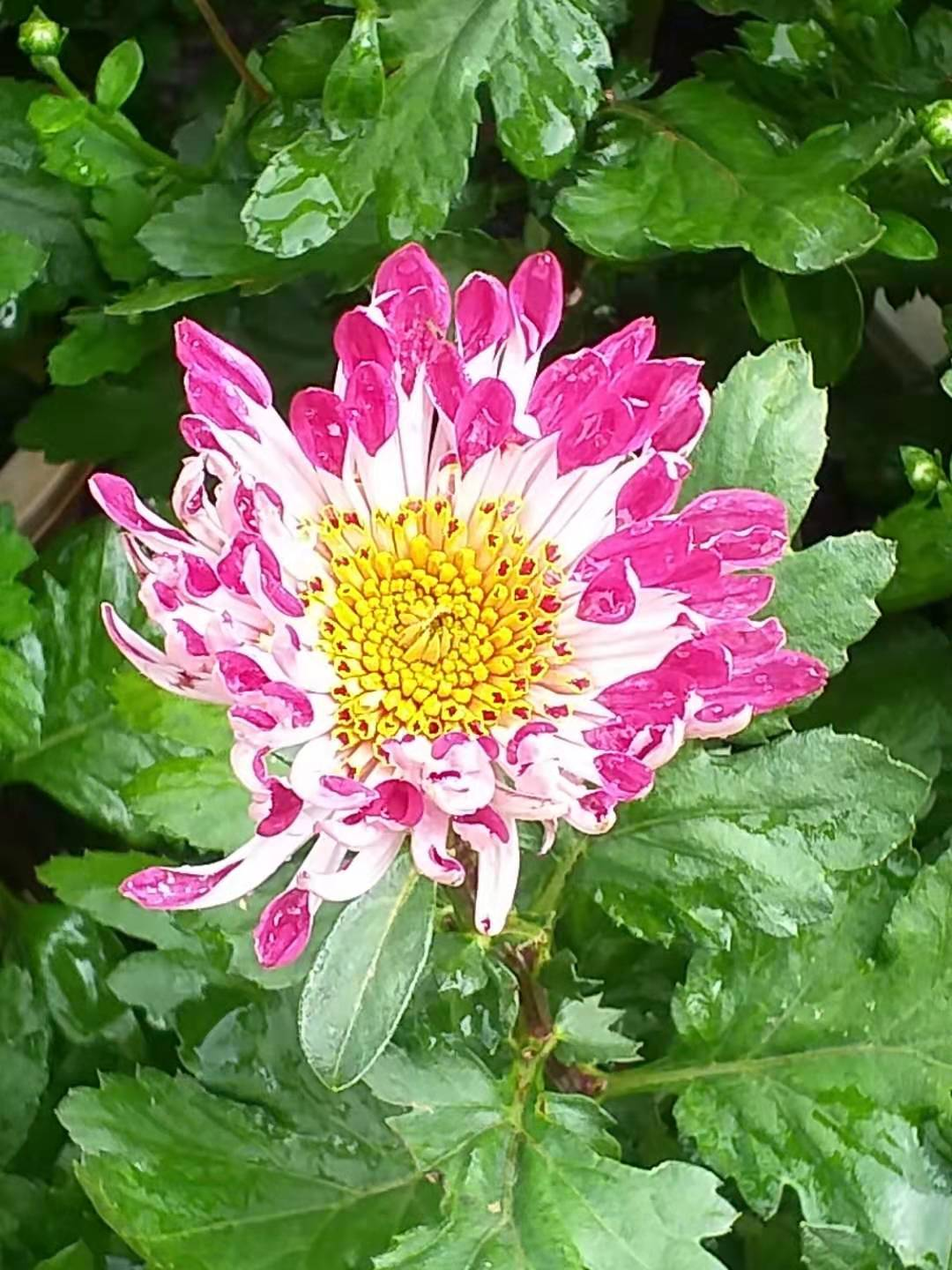

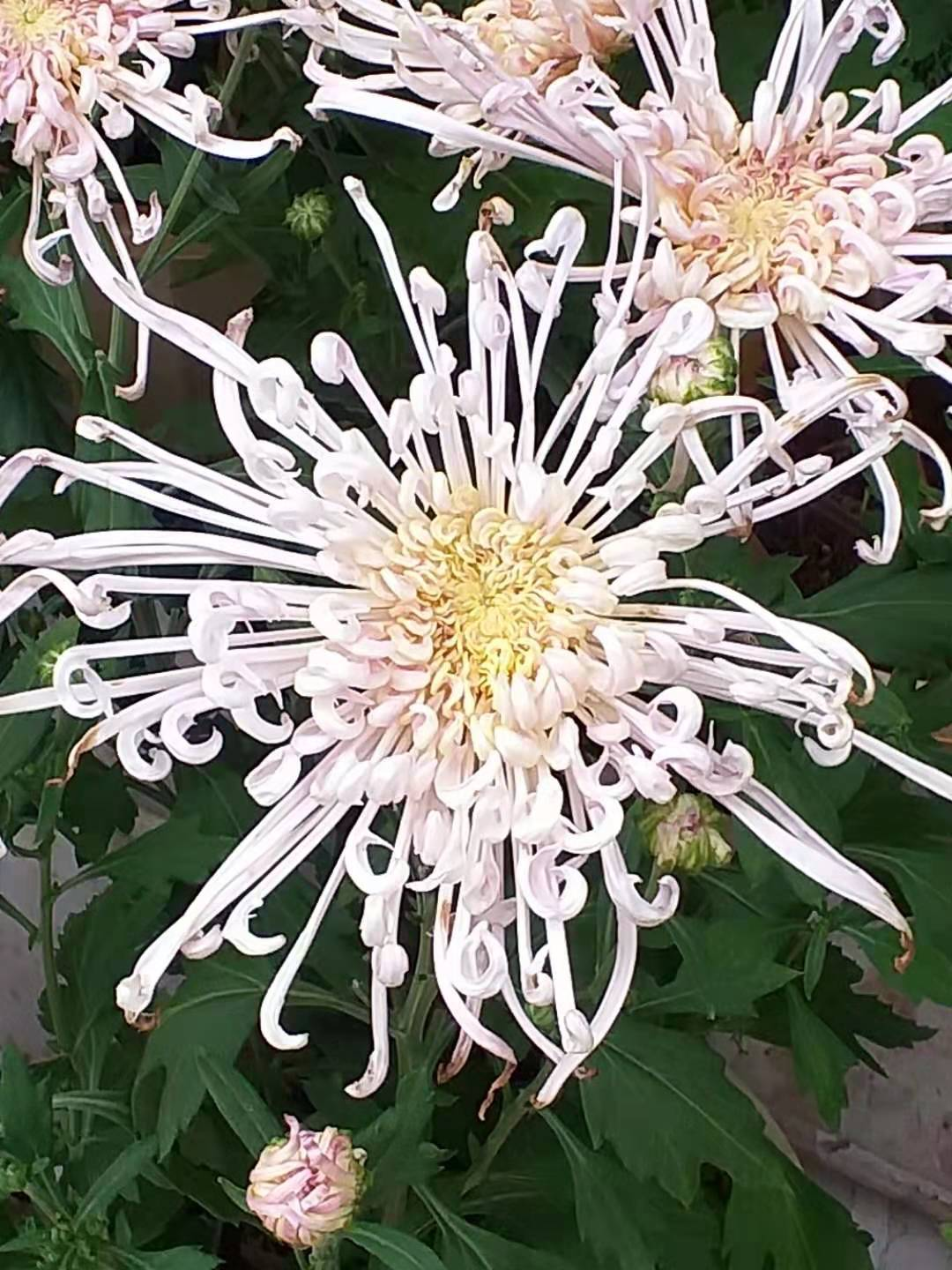

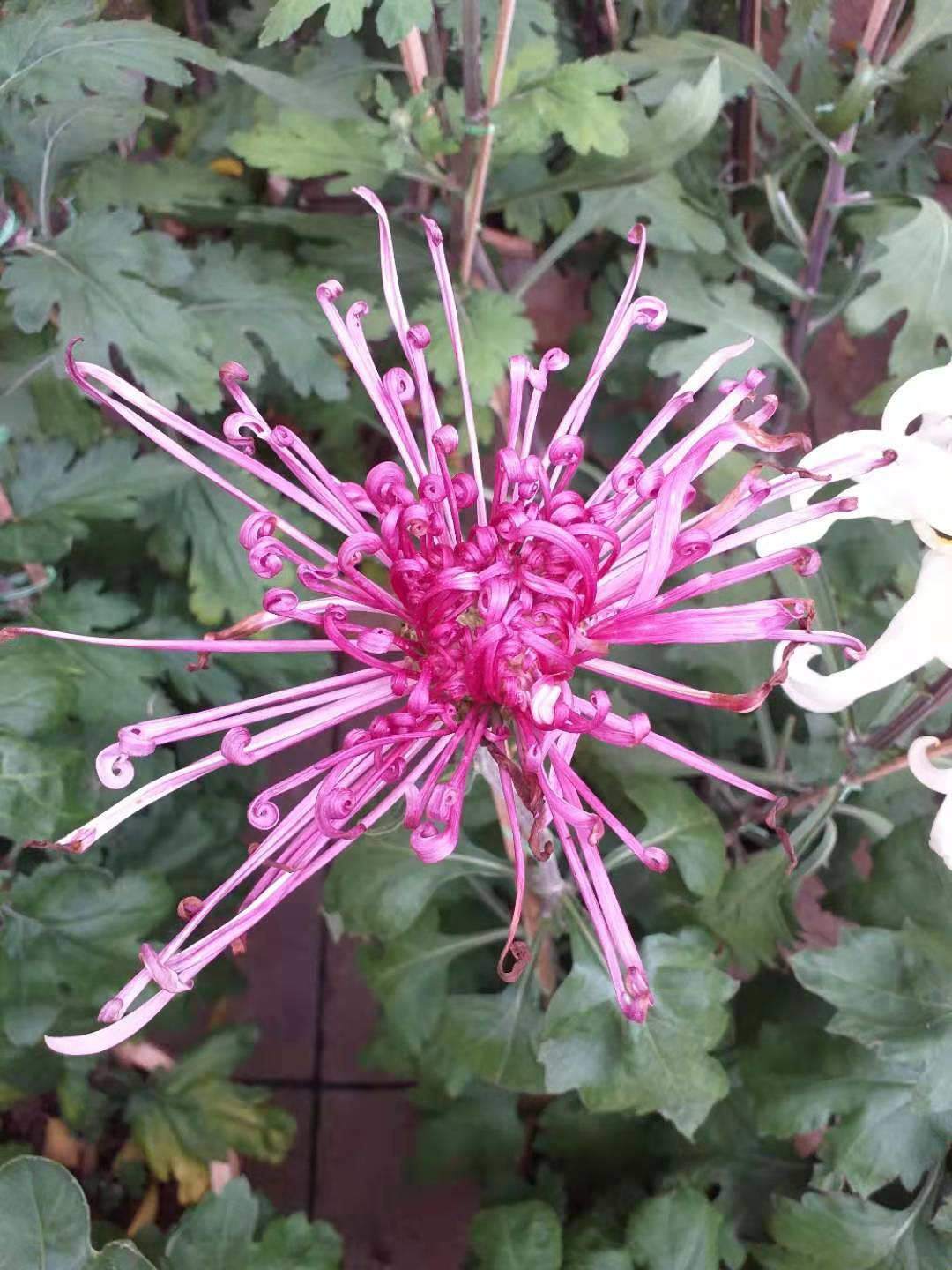

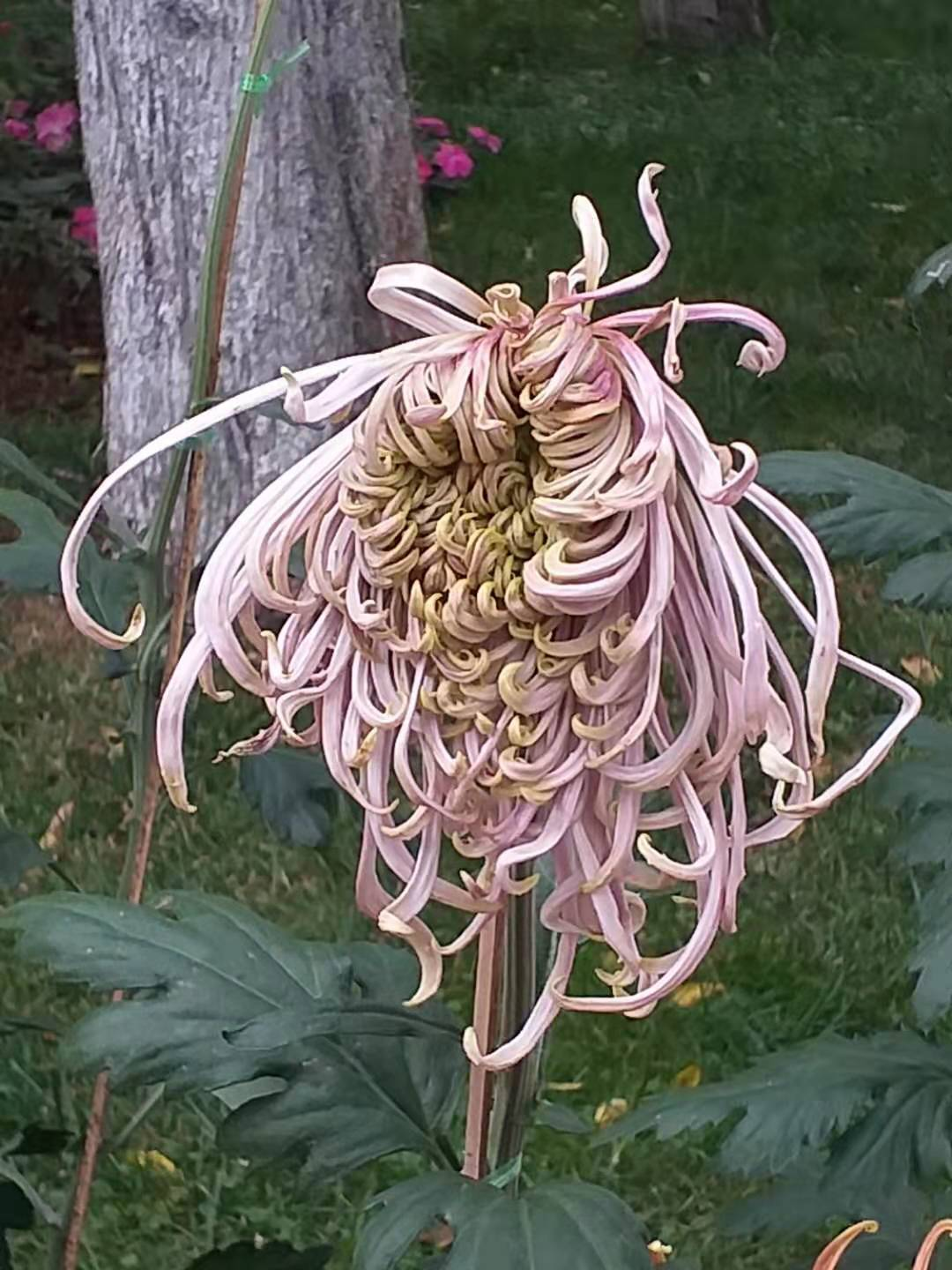

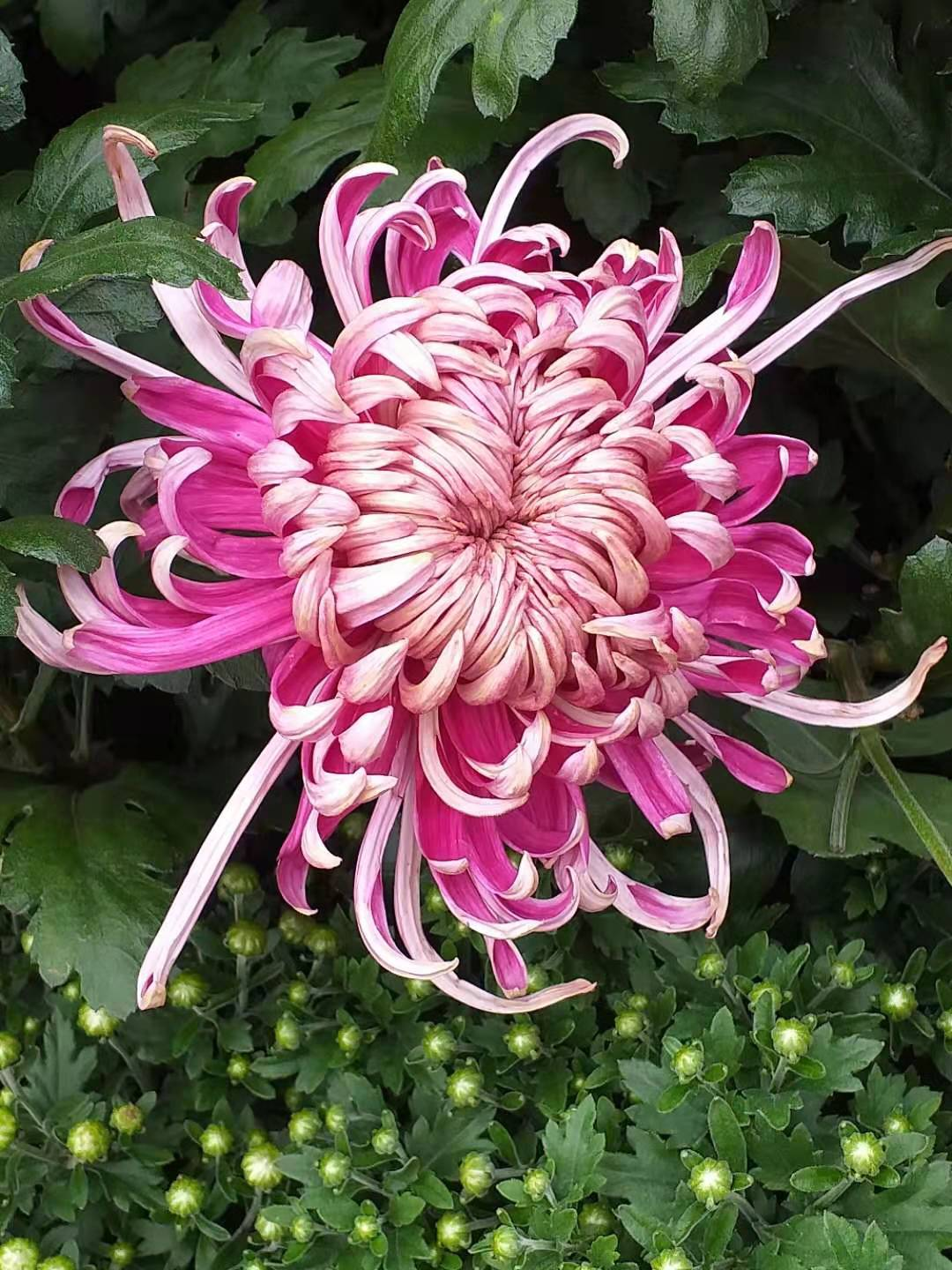

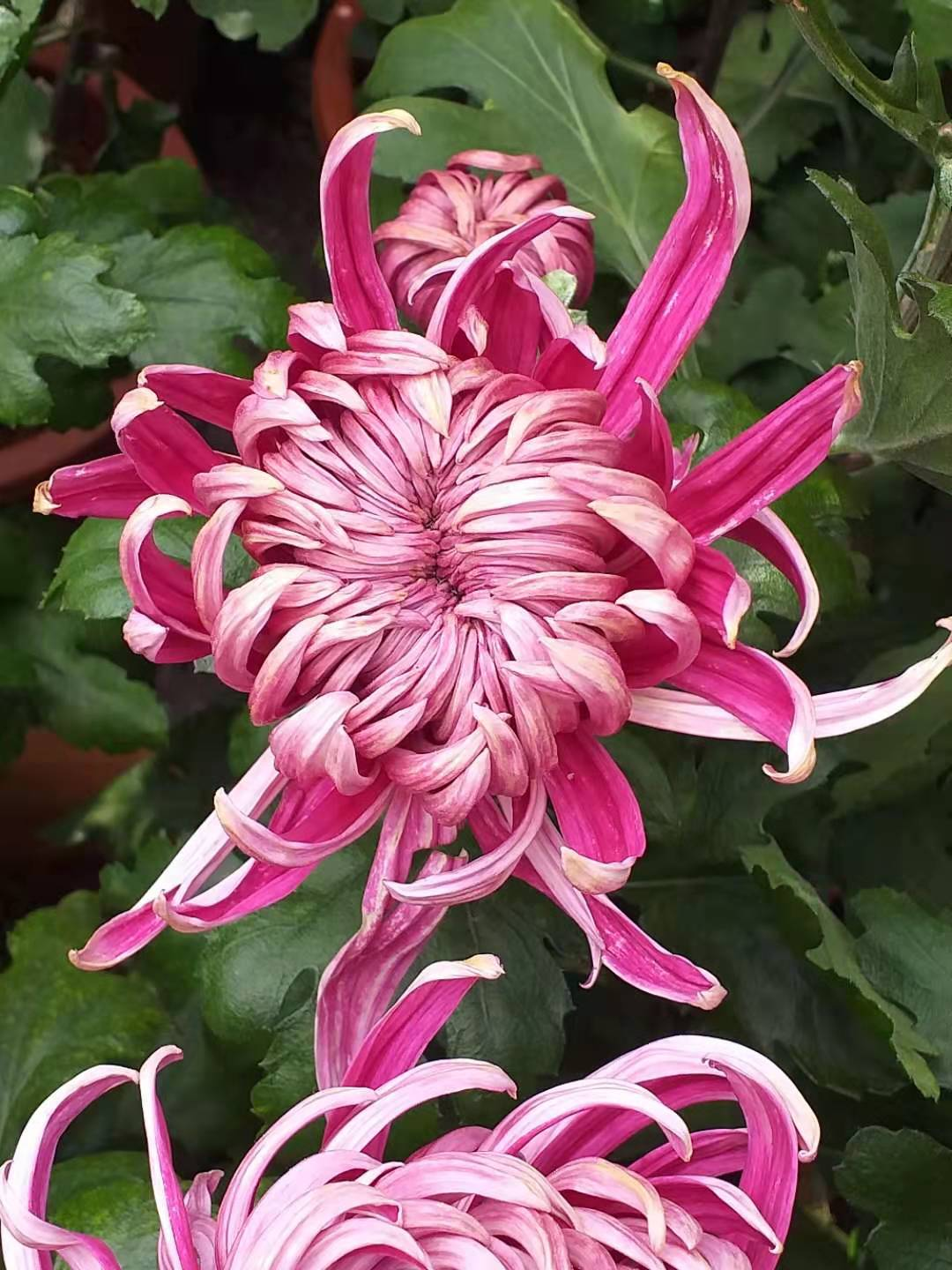

== Bibliography ==
- Bailey, L.H., ed. (1919) [1914]. The standard cyclopedia of horticulture; a discussion, for the amateur, and the professional and commercial grower, of the kinds, characteristics and methods of cultivation of the species of plants grown in the regions of the United States and Canada for ornament, for fancy, for fruit and for vegetables; with keys to the natural families and genera, descriptions of the horticultural capabilities of the states and provinces and dependent islands, and sketches of eminent horticulturists (6 vols.) (3rd. ed.). New York: Macmillan.
- Dyer, M.H. (14 March 2013). "How to Grow Chrysanthemum Morifolium". Home Guides: Gardening. San Francisco Chronicle.
- Herrington, Arthur (November 2008) [1905 Orange Judd, New York]. The Chrysanthemum. Bedford MA: Applewood Books. ISBN 978-1-4290-1286-7.
