= Indica =

Indica is classical Greek and Latin for "of India".

== Historical ethnographic accounts of India ==
- Indica (Arrian), Arrian's account of Nearchus' voyage from India
- Indica (Ctesias), a recording of the beliefs of the Persians about India by the classical Greek author Ctesias
- Indica (Megasthenes), his account of his travels in India
- Indica, Al-Biruni's account of his travels in India

== Arts ==
- Indica (Argentine band)
- Indica (Finnish band)
- Indica Gallery, a London art gallery in the 1960s
- Indica Watson, English actress

== Brands and companies ==
- Indica Records, an independent record label founded by the band GrimSkunk
- Tata Indica, an automobile by Tata Motors, India

== Other ==
- Cannabis indica
- Azadirecta indica
- Dillenia Indica
- Fromia indica
- Oryza indica

== See also ==
- Indika (disambiguation)
- Indicus (disambiguation)
- Indicum (disambiguation)
- India (disambiguation)
- Pax Indica (disambiguation)
