= Oidium indicum =

Scientific classification
- Kingdom: Fungi
- Division: Ascomycota
- Class: Leotiomycetes
- Order: Helotiales
- Family: Erysiphaceae
- Genus: Oidium
- Species: O. indicum

Binomial name
- Oidium indicum Kamat, (1955)

Species of fungus

Oidium indicum is a plant pathogen that affects papaya, causing powdery mildew.
