= Indica (Argentine band) =

Índica
- Origin: Buenos Aires, Argentina
- Genres: Psychedelic rock
- Years active: 2006–present
- Labels: RED (ARG); Ultrapop (ARG)
- Members: Ruben Farzati; David Vera; Guillermo Rodríguez; Matias Gallipoli
- Website: www.indicamusica.com

Índica is an Argentine psychedelic rock band formed in the 2006 in Buenos Aires, Argentina by Rubén Farzati and David Vera. The band is named after a counterculture art gallery of the late 60s, Indica Gallery, located in Masons Yard, London, England.

== History ==
Rubén Farzati and David Vera formed Indica to form a unique and personal musical project, trying to generate a space unexisting in the musical scenario. By the end of 2006, Índica decided to independently edit its first album called “Liebe” and starts a tour of concerts until the year 2008 when the band caught the people and several musical producers attention. In a concert in “La Trastienda” organized by Sonica/Speedy for the “selection of bands” for the Pepsi Music 2008, Índica met the music and producer Daniel Melero, who delighted with this unknown band's music, decided to record and produce them. Due to the great musical impact Índica generated in the “selection of bands”, it is selected finalist and performs in the megafestival Pepsi Music 2008, obtaining also a discographic contract with “Arroz Discos” and its distribution by Sony Music.

== Members ==
Line-up:

- Rubén Farzati - Lead vocals, Guitar
- David Vera - Lead vocals, Bass
- Guillermo Rodríguez - Guitar
- Matías Gallipoli - drums

=== Past members ===
- Pablo Fabregat - Guitar
- Gastón Del Popolo - drums
- Walter Von Specht - Guitar

== Discography ==
=== Albums ===
- Liebe - 2006
- Virgen de electrones - 2009 / Arroz Discos (ARG) / PopArt (ARG) / Sony Music (ARG)
- Octonírico - 2015 / RED (ARG) / Ultrapop (ARG)

=== Singles ===
- "Astrolab" - 2009
- "En Trance" - 2009
- "Cassius Clay" - 2009
- "Amanecer Solo" - 2009
- "Próximo recuerdo" - 2015
- "S.O.S." - 2015
- "Funeral" - 2015
- "¿Adónde fue?" - 2015
