= Wehella Kankanamge Indika =

Sri Lankan politician

Wehella Kankanamge Indika is a Sri Lankan politician and a member of the Parliament of Sri Lanka.

== Political career ==
- Provincial Council Member, 1990–2003
- Provincial Minister of Agriculture and Irrigation, 2003–2004
- Provincial Minister of Sports, Rural Development and Youth Affairs, 2004–2009
- Provincial Minister for Education and Co-operatives, 2009–present.
