= Indicum =

Indicum, Indian in Latin, may refer to:

Music

- Indicum (album), album by Swedish band Bobo Stenson Trio

Companies

- Indicum (company), Swedish interior architects

== See also ==
- Indicus (disambiguation)
- Indica (disambiguation)
- Indian (disambiguation)
