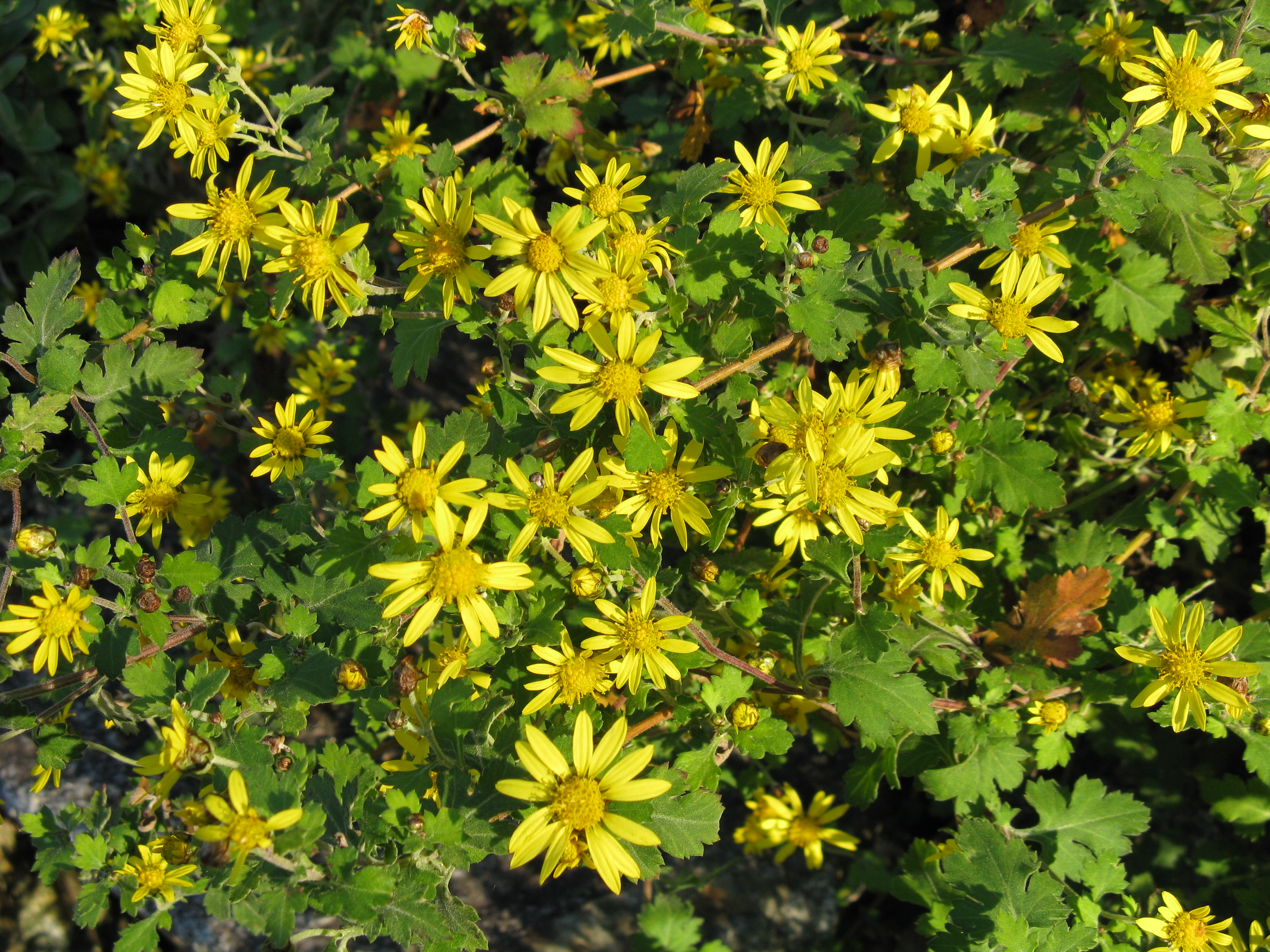

Scientific classification
- Kingdom: Plantae
- Clade: Tracheophytes
- Clade: Angiosperms
- Clade: Eudicots
- Clade: Asterids
- Order: Asterales
- Family: Asteraceae
- Genus: Chrysanthemum
- Species: C. indicum

Binomial name
- Chrysanthemum indicum L.

Synonyms
- Several, including: Achillea bandana Buch.-Ham.; Achillea berdana Buch.-Ham. ex DC.; Arctotis elegans Thunb.; Bidens bardanna Wall.; Bidens marginata DC.

= Chrysanthemum indicum =

Species of flowering plant

Chrysanthemum indicum is a flowering plant commonly called Indian chrysanthemum, within the family Asteraceae and genus Chrysanthemum.

== Description ==
Chrysanthemum indicum grows up to 1 m (3 ft) tall and 0.6 m (2 ft) across. It usually blooms from August to October, producing yellow or white flowers and yellow pollen.

== Distribution and habitat ==
It grows outside under sunlight with moist soil. It can tolerate light (sandy), medium (loamy) and heavy (clay) soils. The soil can be acidic, neutral, or alkaline.

== Cultivation ==
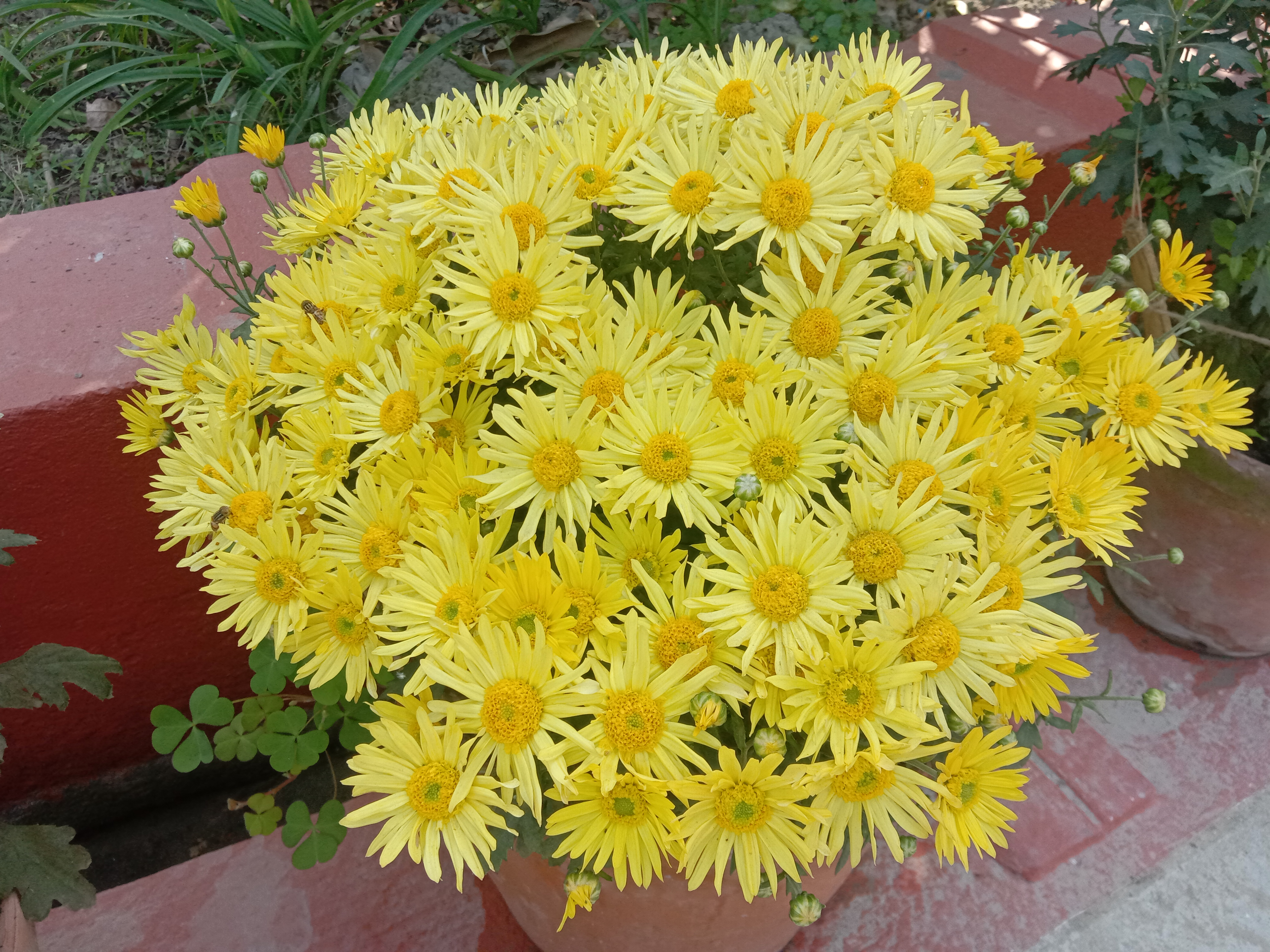
Full bloom flowers of Chrysanthemum indicum in West Bengal, India.

Chrysanthemum indicum is a plant of the temperate zone but it can be grown successfully outside the area such as in tropical areas as it is often cultivated in Southeast Asia with moist soil (pH around 6.5) in sunny weather. It can handle temperatures down to −10 °C (14 °F). Seeds can be sowed between the range of August to October. It usually starts to grow in 10 to 18 days at 15 °C (59 °F).

== Uses ==
The flower heads are pickled in vinegar. The flowers can be used to make drinks such as chrysanthemum tea, and the young leaves can also be steeped or cooked. The petals can also be blanched for use in salads and other dishes.
