= Korean regional cuisine =

Korean regional cuisines are characterized by local specialties and distinctive styles within Korean cuisine. The divisions reflected historical boundaries of the provinces where these food and culinary traditions were preserved until modern times.

Although Korea has been divided into two nation-states since 1948 (North Korea and South Korea), it was once divided into eight provinces according to the administrative districts of the Joseon period. The northern region consisted of the Hamgyong, Pyongan, and Hwanghae Provinces. The central region consisted of the Gyeonggi, Chungcheong, and Kangwon provinces. The Gyeongsang and Jeolla Provinces made up the southern region.

Until the late 19th century transportation networks were not well developed, and each provincial region preserved its own characteristic tastes and cooking methods. Geographic differences are also reflected by the local specialty foodstuffs depending on the climate and types of agriculture, as well as the natural foods available. With the modern development of transportation, and the introduction of foreign foods, Korean regional cuisines have tended to overlap and integrate. However, there are still many unique traditional dishes in Korean regional cuisine that have been handed down through the generations.

== Northern region ==
=== Pyongan province ===
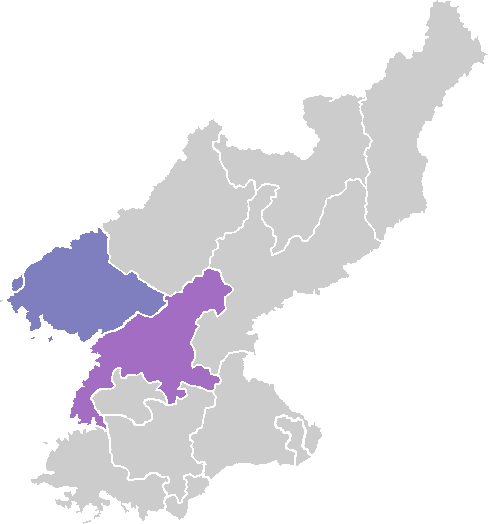
North Pyongan Province South Pyongan Province

Pyongan cuisine, based in Pyongan Province, is characterized as a continental style due to early Manchurian influence. Dishes are made into large shapes so as to appear abundant. Jobap, a bowl of mixed steamed rice and millet, is commonly served in place of ssalbap (steamed rice), and foods made with grain flour such as noodle dishes, especially naengmyeon (cold buckwheat noodles), and mandu (dumplings) are common Pyongan dishes. The cuisine's taste is generally bland, with fatty foods being enjoyed during winter. The form of a Pyongan meal is realistic and social. The kimchi, or preserved pickled vegetables, eaten in the region consist mostly of dongchimi, a water kimchi, which is frequently used as a broth for naengmyeon.

Representative main dishes include gukbap (a soup with rice), kimchi mari (cold kimchi broth with rice), dakjuk (chicken porridge), Pyongyang naengmyeon (cold buckwheat noodle soup), eobok jaengban (pressed beef served in a brass plate), gangnyang guksu (corn noodles in a cold broth), Pyongyang manduguk (Pyongyang style dumpling soup), and gulmandu (small dumpling without a covering).

Pyongan style banchan, which are small side dishes accompanied by a main dish, include: ttokttoki jaban (seasoned shredded beef), mucheonggom (braised radish leaves and beef), deopuljang (fermented soybean paste), danggochujang bokkeum (stir-fried dish in chili pepper paste), dwaeji gogijeon (pork pancakes), naengchae (cold salad), Yongpyon gimjang kimchi (Yongbyon style kimchi), gaji kimchi (pickled eggplant), baek kimchi (kimchi without chili pepper), and kkotge jjim (steamed horse crab). Oi tojangguk (cucumber soybean paste soup), and naepotang (kimchi and chitterling stew) are representative soups and stews.

Tteok or glutinous rice cakes of the region are given unconventional names and are larger and simpler in form than those of Seoul, such as songgi tteok which is a rice cake made with the inner bark of pine trees, golmi tteok (thimble-shaped rice cake), kkojang tteok (tteok covered with steamed bean crumbles), ppong tteok (tteok steamed with mulberry leaves), nidoraemi (rice cake covered with azuki bean crumbles), and jogae songpyeon (clam-shaped tteok with fillings). The songgi in songgi tteok refers to the inner bark of pine trees, and its ground flour is mixed with glutinous rice flour and kneaded. The dough is steamed or filled with ground pine nuts and then pan-fried with sesame oil. Notti is another characteristic tteok of Pyongan and Hwanghae provinces, made by pounding a saccharified dough of hulled millet flour, and pan-frying its pieces with oil.

Pyongan hangwa or traditional confectionery are gwajul (fried honeyed confection) and yeot (candies). Taesik is also a variety of the regional hangwa, made by mixing jocheong (liquefied yeot) and misu (steamed and dried mixed flour made from various grains and beans).

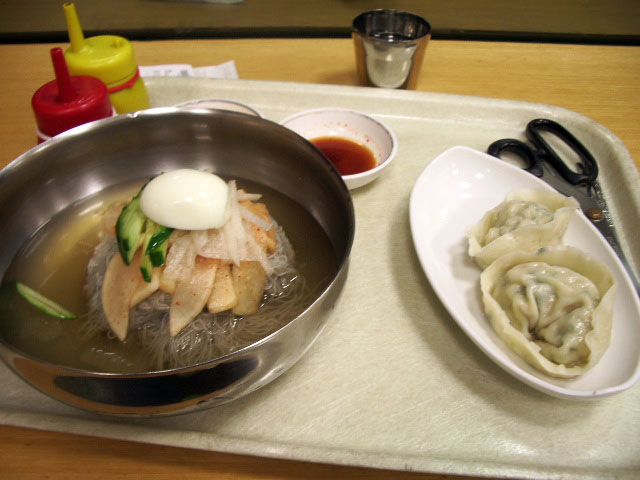
Mul naengmyeon or Pyongyang naengmyeon (cold buckwheat noodle soup) and mandu (stuffed dumplings).

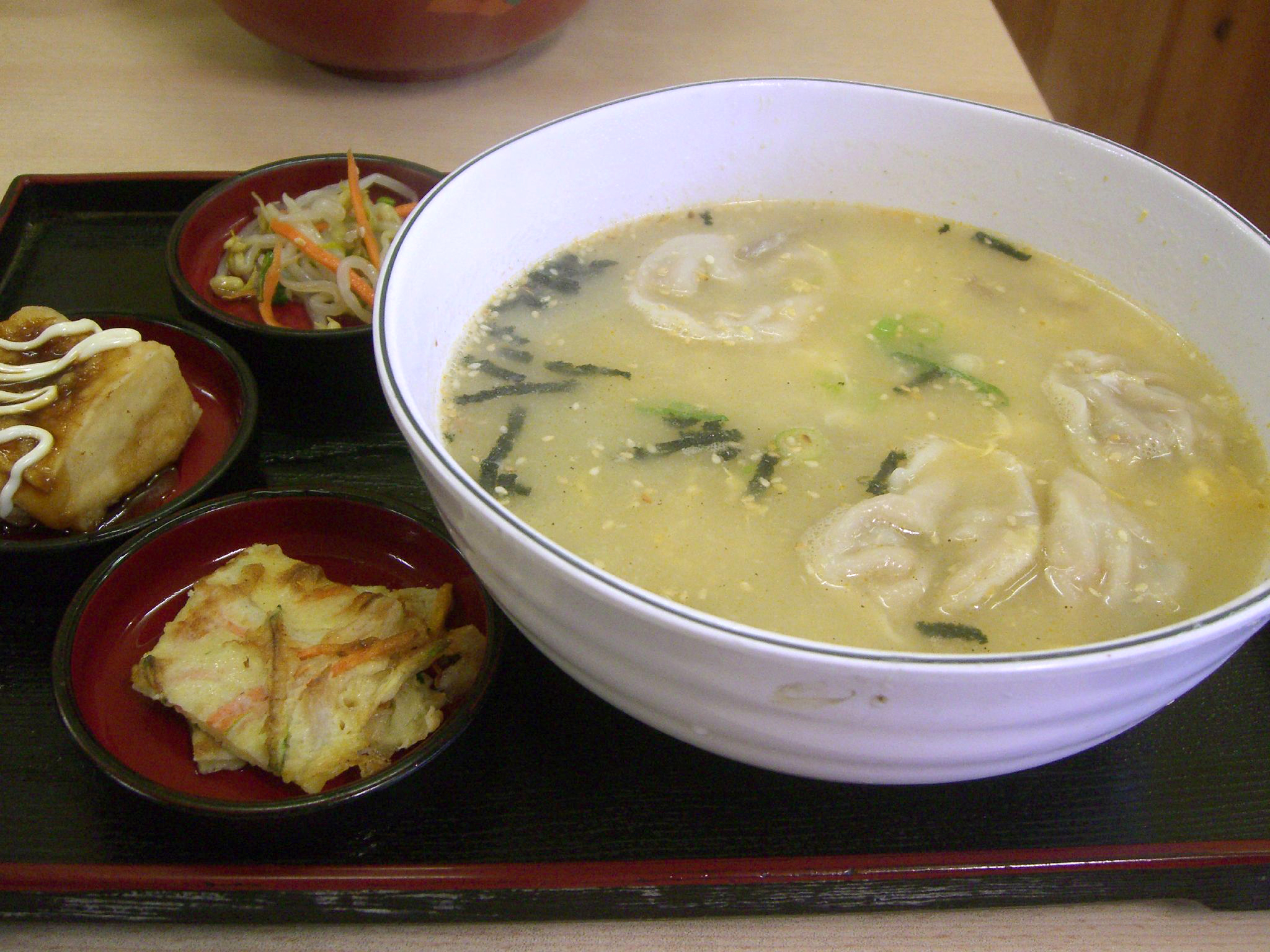
Manduguk, dumpling soup

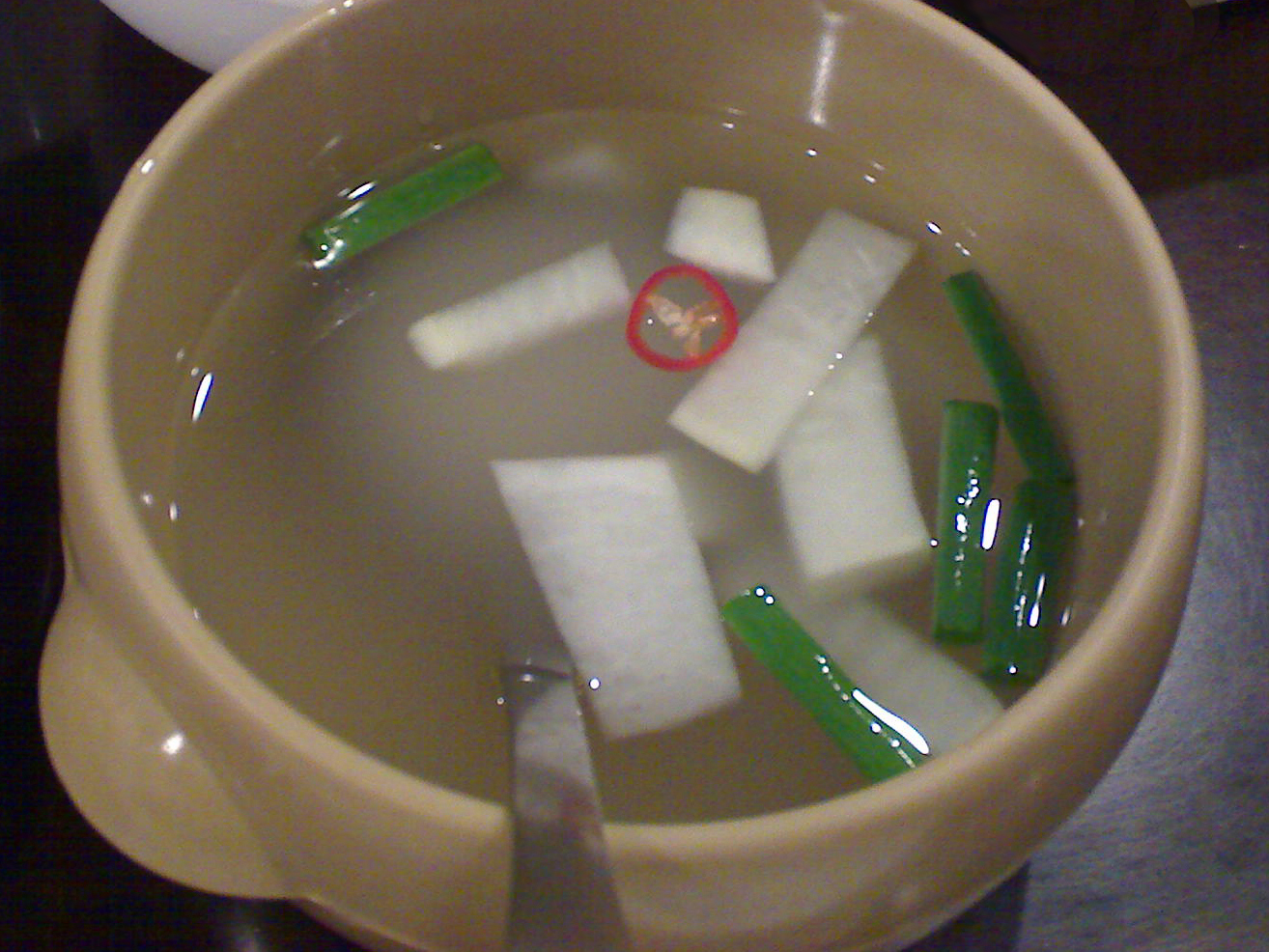
Dongchimi, a water kimchi

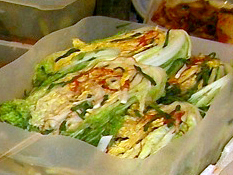
Baek kimchi, kimchi seasoned without chili pepper powder.

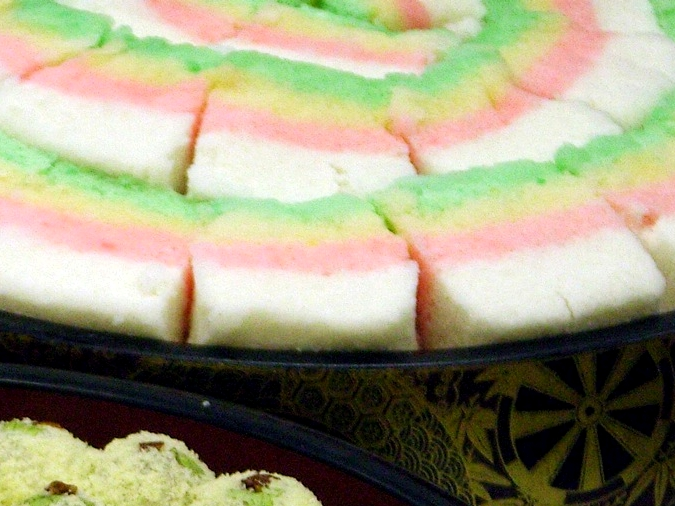
Mujigae tteok, rainbow rice cake

=== Pyongyang ===
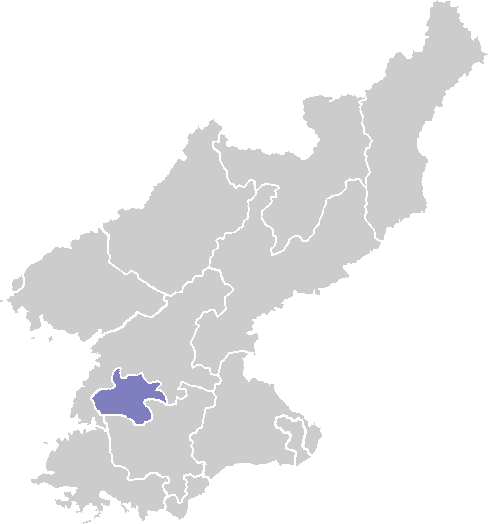
Map of Pyongyang

Pyongyang, currently the capital of North Korea, was also the capital of Gojoseon, and the provincial capital of Pyongan province until 1946. Therefore, Pyongyang cuisine shares the general culinary tradition of Pyongan province. The most famous local food is Pyongyang naengmyeon, also called mul naengmyeon or just simply naengmyeon. Naengmyeon literally means "cold noodles," while the affix mul refers to "water" because the dish is served in a cold soup. Naengmyeon consists of thin and chewy buckwheat noodles in cold broth mixed with a meat broth, and dongchimi (watery kimchi) topped with a slice of sweet Korean pear. Pyongyang naengmyeon was originally eaten at homes built with ondol (traditional underfloor heating) during the cold winter, so is also humorously called "Pyongyang deoldeori" (shivering in Pyongyang). Pyongyang locals sometimes enjoyed it as a haejangguk which is any type of food eaten as a hangover cure— commonly in the form of a warm soup.

Another representative Pyongyang dish is Taedonggang sungeoguk, meaning "trout soup from the Taedong River". It is made with trout, which are abundant in the Taedong River, along with black peppercorns and salt. It is served as a courtesy to important guests visiting Pyongyang. Therefore, the question "How good was the taste of the trout soup?" is commonly used to greet people returning from Pyongyang. In addition, Pyongyang onban (literally "warm rice of Pyongyang") is a local specialty. It is a dish made with freshly cooked rice topped with sliced mushrooms and chicken, and a couple of bindaetteok (pancakes made from ground mung beans and vegetables).

=== Hamgyong province ===
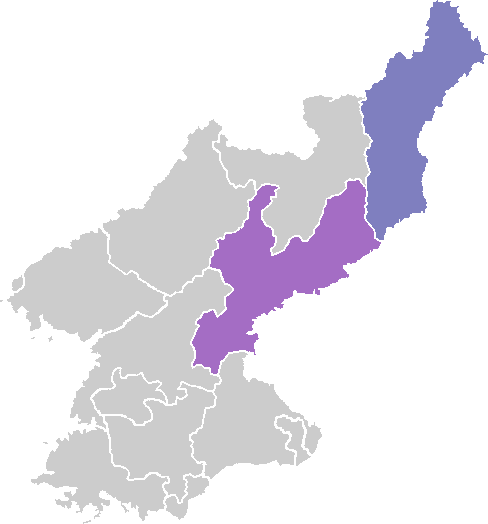
North Hamgyong Province South Hamgyong Province

Hamgyong province, consisting of North and South Hamgyong Provinces, belongs to the administration of North Korea. It lies in the far northern region of the Korean Peninsula, comprising steep mountains and valleys while facing the Sea of Japan (East Sea) to the east. Cereal crop farming is developed in the region, so diverse types of high quality cereals such as millet, barnyard millet, sorghum, soybeans, and maize are harvested. In contrast with millet, and sorghum harvested in South Korea, those of Hamgyon provinces have a more glutinous texture, and have good, savory tastes. The quality of potatoes and grains is also high, so the starch obtained from the crops is used to make noodles. Fresh Alaska pollack and various fish are caught in the adjacent sea.

Although Hamgyong cuisine is not salty, garlic and chili pepper are used heavily as seasonings. The alternative name, dadegi, for chili powder-based sauce originates from the region. Hamhung naengmyeon, a cold noodle dish, is made with the sauce. It originates in Hamhung, South Hamgyong province, and is topped with hoe (sliced raw fish) seasoned with hot and spicy sauce. The noodles are mixed with the hoe and sauce, so called hoe naengmyeon, which is different from naengmyeon eaten in the rest of North Korea. However, the taste of North Hamgyong province is plainer and less spicy than that of South Hamgyong province. The shape is large and a continental style, so decoration of dishes is simple and less luxurious. The locals are active, and enjoy wild foods.

Typical main dishes in Hamgyong cuisine include: japgokbap (a bowl of cooked mixed multiple grains), jjinjobap (steamed sorghum), dak bibimbap (mixed rice and vegetables with chicken slices), eollin kongjuk (porridge made with frozen soybeans), and oksusujuk (corn porridge). Garitguk is a beef short rib soup topped with yukhoe, raw seasoned beef. Along with Hamhung naengmyeon, Mul naengmyeon, and gamja guksu (potato noodles) are common noodle dishes. Gamja makgari mandu is a dumpling made with ground potato.

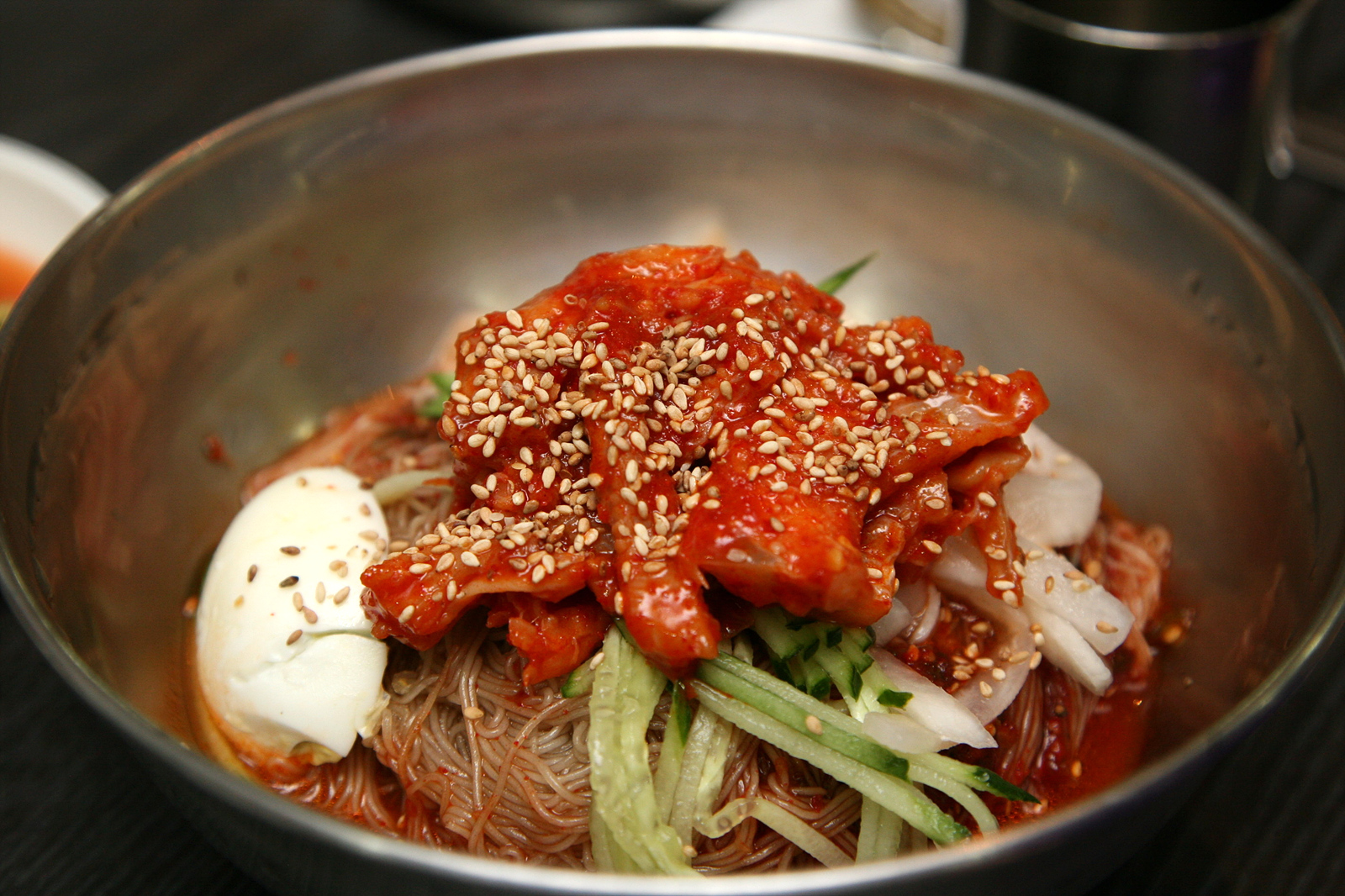
Hoe naengmyeon, hot and spicy cold buckwheat noodles with hoe (raw fish).

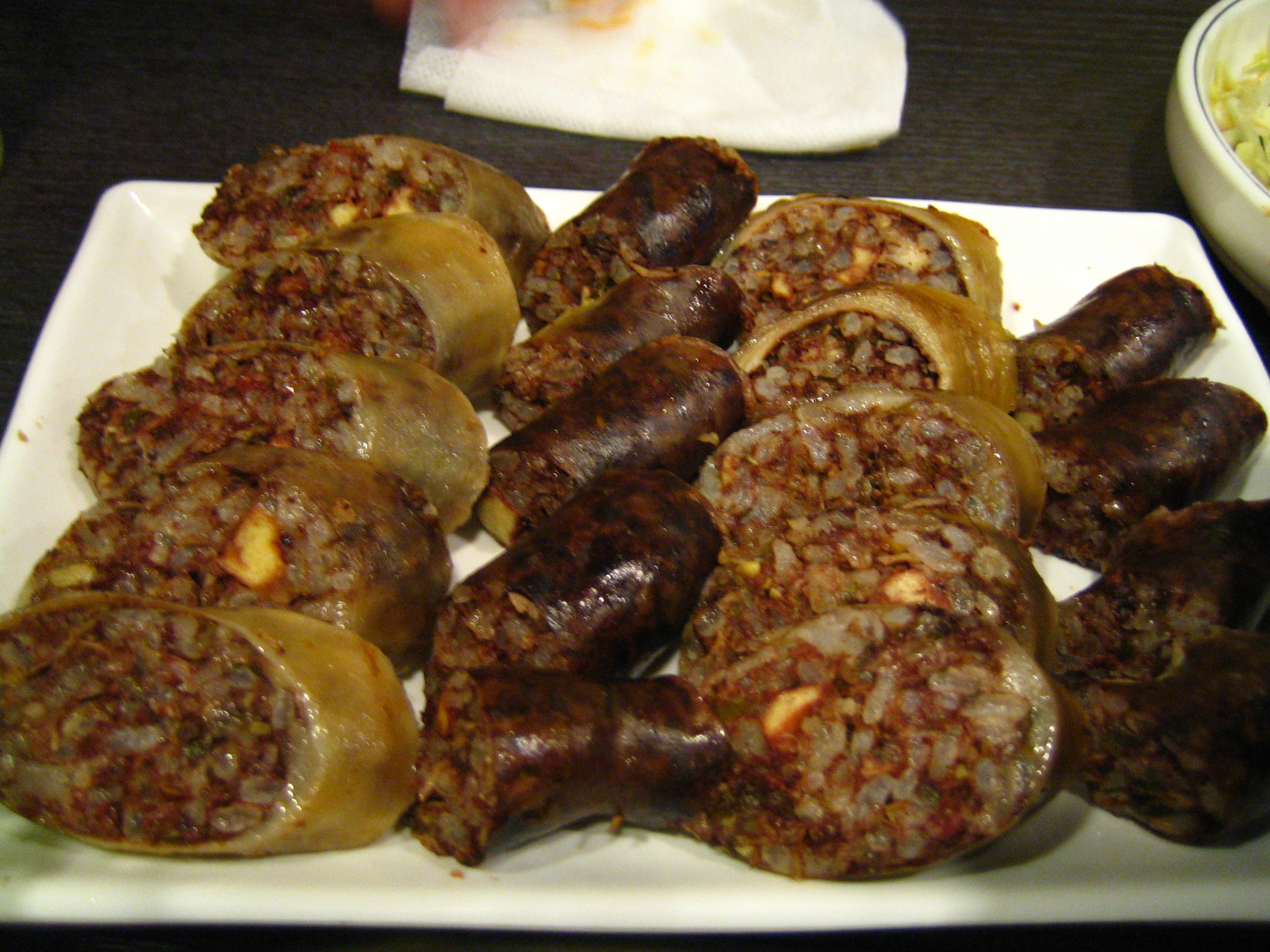
Sundae, blood sausage

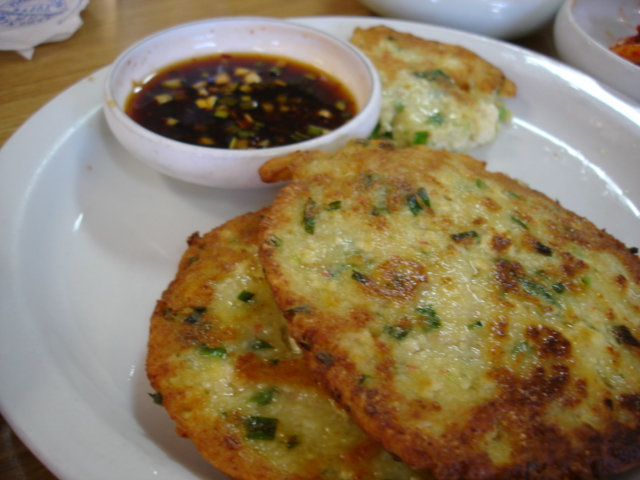
Dubujeon, tofu pancake

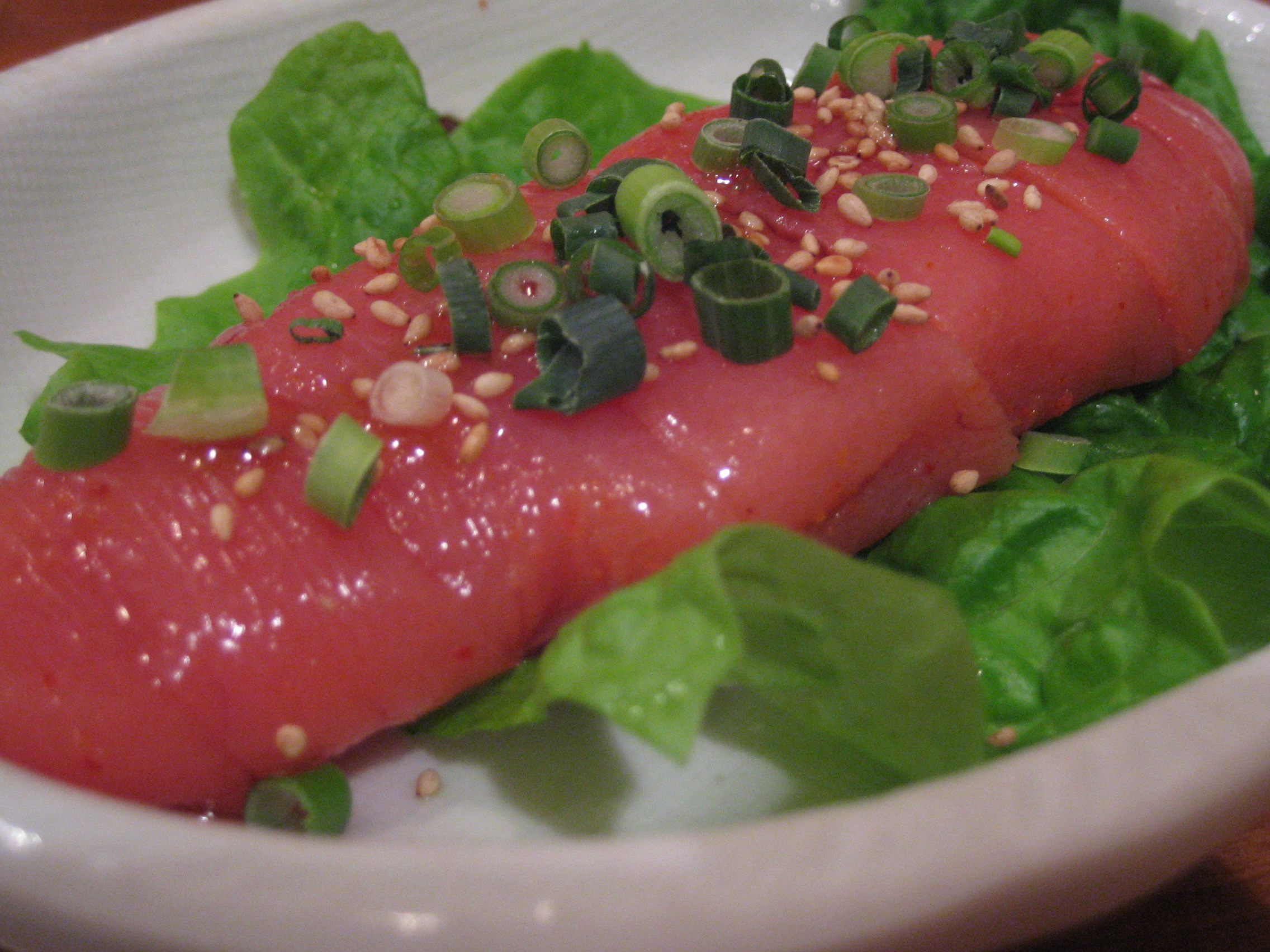
Myeongran jeot, seasoned Alaska pollack roe.

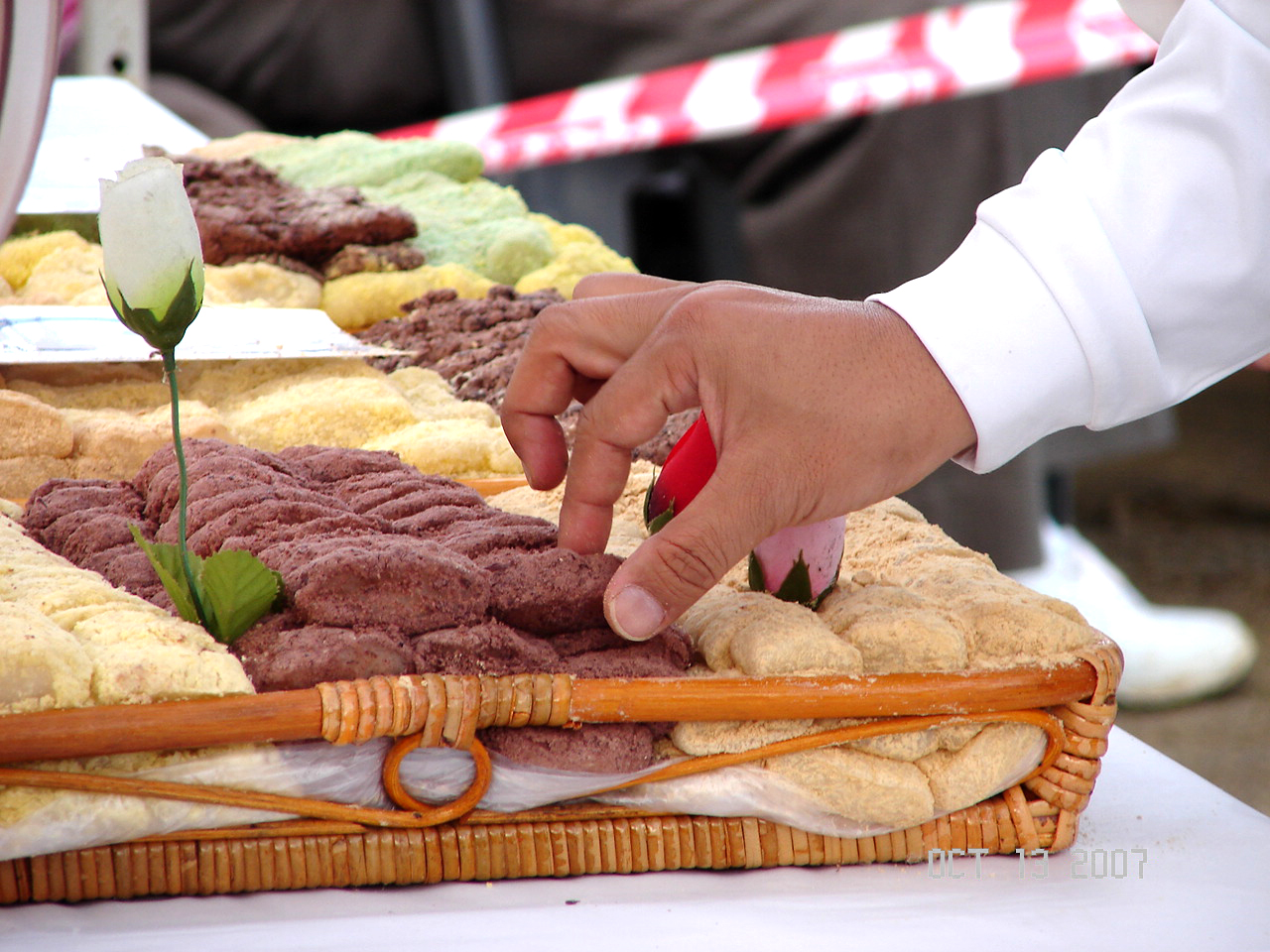
Injeolmi, glutinous rice cake covered with steamed bean powder

=== Chagang and Ryanggang provinces ===
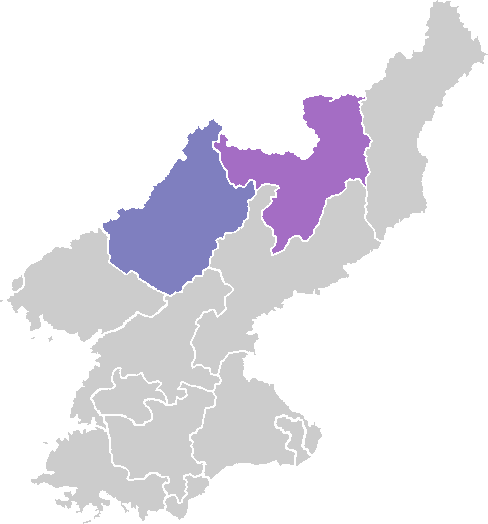
Chagang Province Ryanggang Province

The Ryanggang Province and Chagang Provinces of North Korea were formerly part of Hamgyong province and Pyongan province until 1954. The two mountainous, landlocked provinces border China to the north. Indian mustard leaves, called gat in Korean, are cultivated in place of Napa cabbage, a main kimchi ingredient, which does not grow well in the region due to poor geographic conditions. Indian mustard leaves have been eaten in spring and autumn as a main vegetable since ancient times, and are used for making gat kimchi to preserve for winter. Gat kimchi has a refreshing and aromatic flavor, which can be retained without loss of texture for a long time. Therefore, gat kimchi is the most famous food representing the provinces. On the other hand, potatoes are also harvested in abundance, so dishes made with potatoes are diversely developed, with up to 80 distinct potato dishes. Representative potato dishes include: gamja nongmal guksu, a noodle dish made with potato starch; gamja tteok, a variety of tteok made with ground potato; gamajatang jorim made by braising potatoes;, and gamja nongmal gangjeong, a fried confectionery made with potato starch. Gamja nongma guksu has a very strong chewy texture because the main ingredient is the potato starch. The noodles are seasoned with chopped green onions, garlic, sesame seeds, soy sauce, and a mixture of sesame seeds and salt. Slices of kimchi, marinated and steamed beef and pork, and shredded cucumbers are added as toppings on the noodles. A broth is served separately.

Susutteok is a local specialty of Chagang province, made with locally produced sorghum, glutinous corn, soybeans, sesame seeds, and azuki beans. It is served with kimchi and namul (sauteed vegetables) collected from the mountains. Various foods made of sorghum can also be found in the province such as susu jijim (sorghum pancakes). In the province, there is a variety of mountain fruits.

== Central region ==
=== Hwanghae province ===
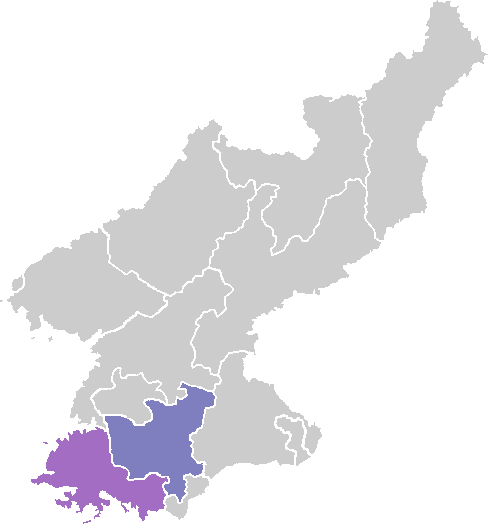
North Hwanghae Province South Hwanghae Province

Hwanghae Province has been divided into South Hwanghae Province and North Hwanghae Province since 1954. Thanks to the wide Yonbaek and Chaenyong plains, Hwanghae province is a granary of North Korea and is known for its good quality cereal production. As the millet seeds produced in the region are thick, and have a good taste, they are eaten as much as barley is consumed by people of the southern region. The abundant production of cereal crops provides quality feed for livestock, so the quality of meat produced in the region is said to be good. Chicken raised in every household is fleshy and of good quality, and is used for many dishes in Hwanghae cuisine. It is used as an ingredient for wheat noodle dishes, and mandu (dumplings). The coastal area, adjacent to the Yellow Sea, produces a lot of salt because the tideland in the area is developed and there is little rainfall. Due to the climate, kimchi in the Hwanghae region has a clear and refreshing taste, so its brine is used as a soup on many occasions. Dongchimi brine is used as a broth for naengmyeon (cold buckwheat noodle dish), or for mixing with a bowl of chilled rice to make a midnight snack. The Hwanghae people are known for kindheartedness and rustic simplicity, so their cuisine reflects their nature. Hwanghae dishes are savory and simple, with less decoration such as mandu made in a larger size than other regions. The general taste is moderate, similar to that of Chungcheong province.

The most famous Hwanghae dish is Haeju bibimbap, originating in Haeju. It consists of fried rice with chopped pork, various namul (sauteed vegetables), and sliced chicken, unlike other bibimbap varieties. It uses black soy sauce on slightly fried and salted rice instead of Gochujang. Other typical main dishes are ssalbap (steamed rice), seariban (three steamed grains), japgokbap (various steamed grains), kimchibap (steamed rice with kimchi), and bijibap (rice with biji, residue in the preparation of tofu).

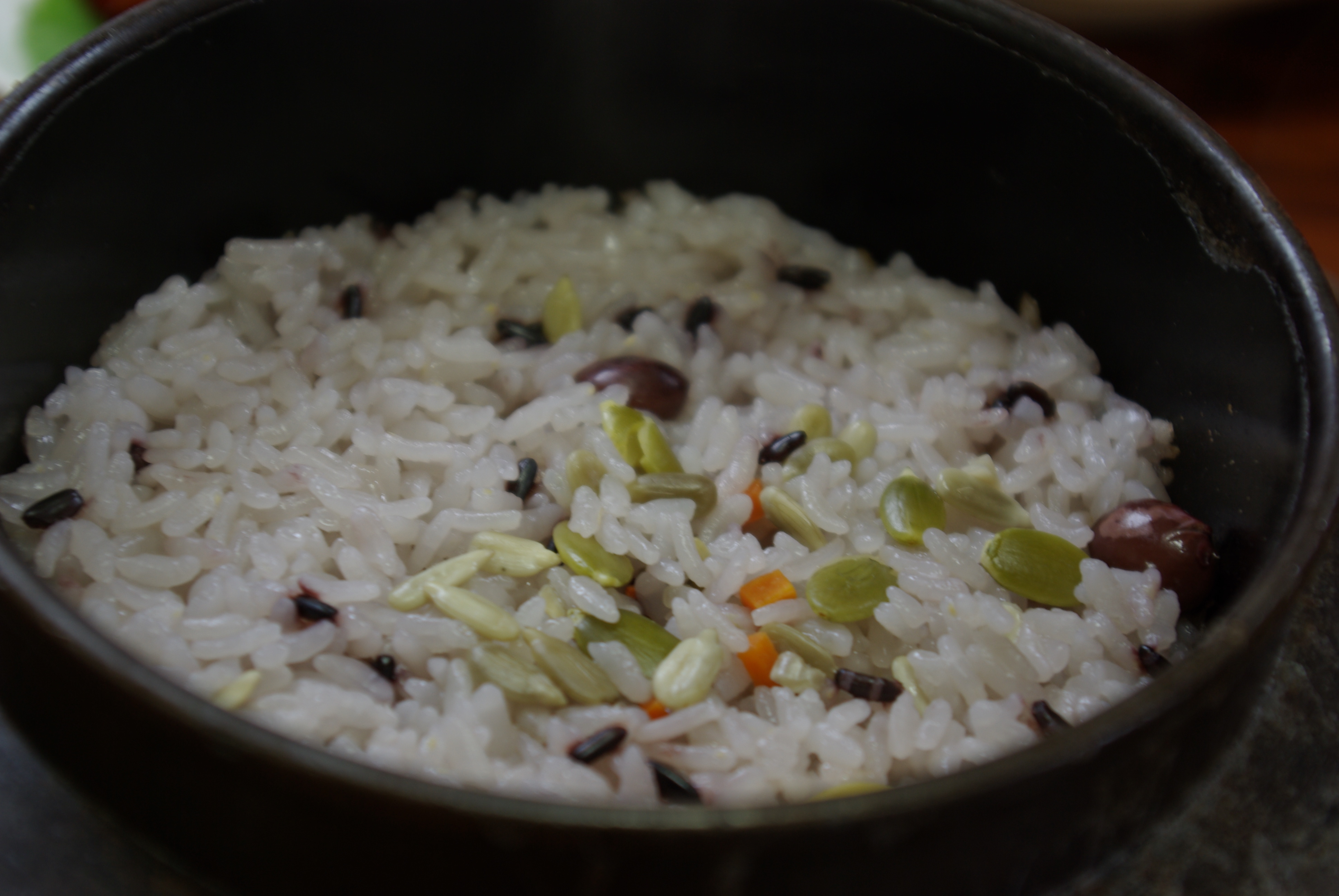
Japgokbap, rice with multiple grains

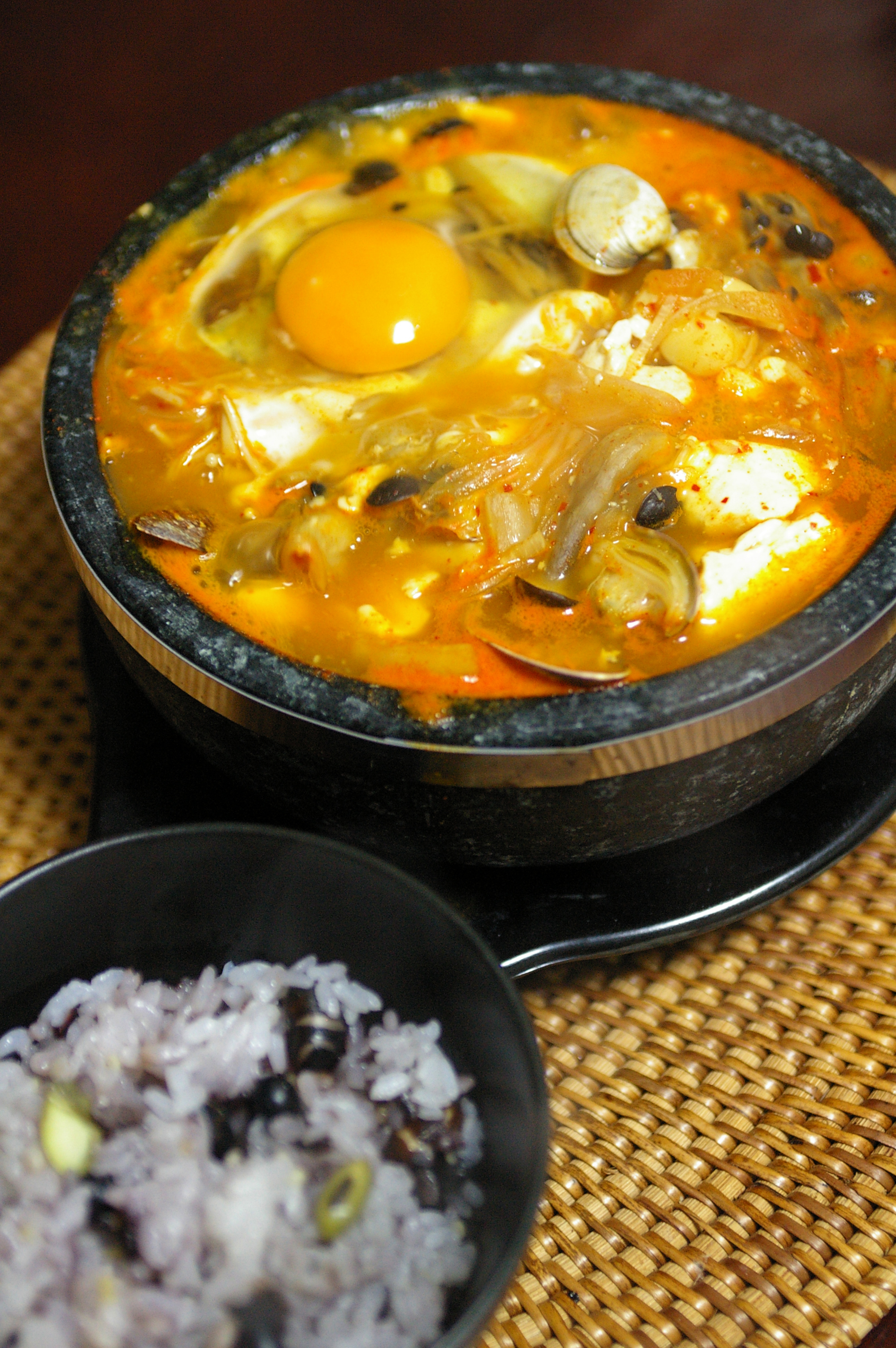
Sundubu jjigae, spicy soft tofu stew

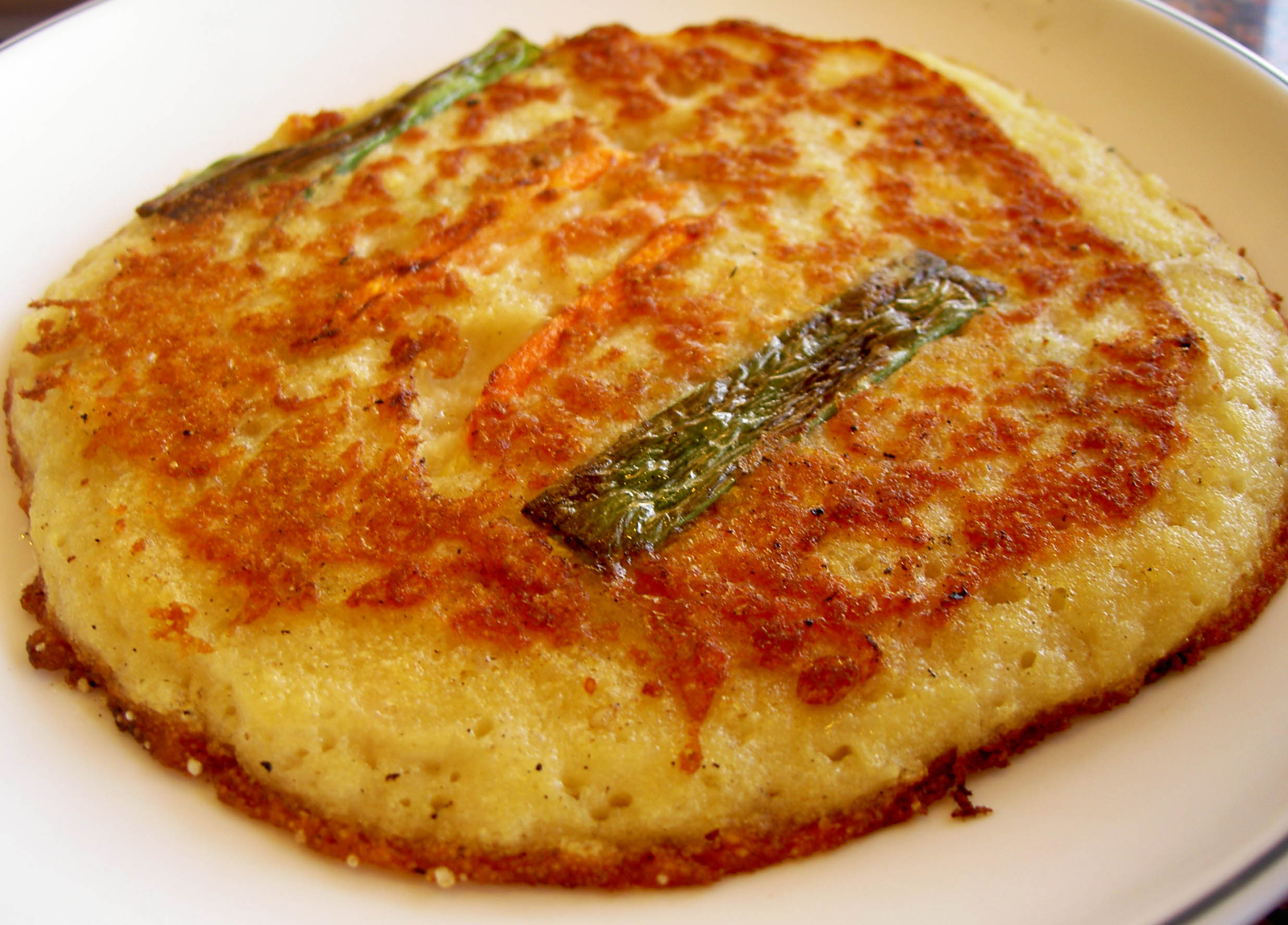
Bindaetteok, mung bean pancake

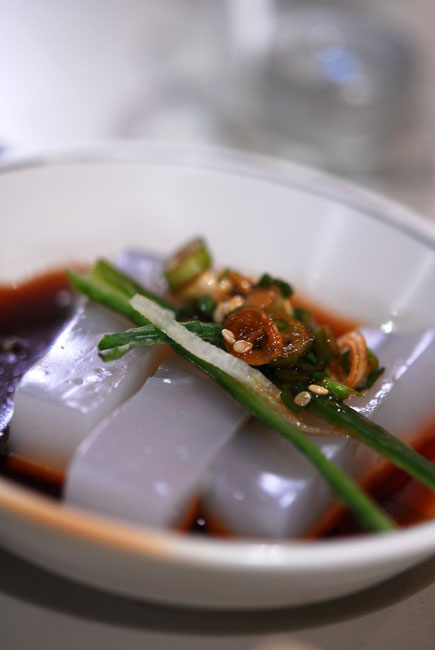
Cheongpomuk, seasoned mung bean starch jelly

=== Gangwon/Kangwon province ===
Gangwon (or Kangwon) cuisine is simple and plain and consists of dishes made with potato, corn, buckwheat, or seafood. Typical main dishes are also based on potatoes and maize with various cooking methods such as Chuncheon dakgalbi, gangnaengi bap (a bowl of steamed corn and rice), makguksu (buckwheat noodle dish), patguksu (noodles in red bean soup), gamja ongsimi (potato dumpling soup), bangpungjuk (porridge made with Glehnia littoralis), gangnaengi beombeok (mashed boiled corn with grains), and gamja beombeok (mashed boiled potato with grains).

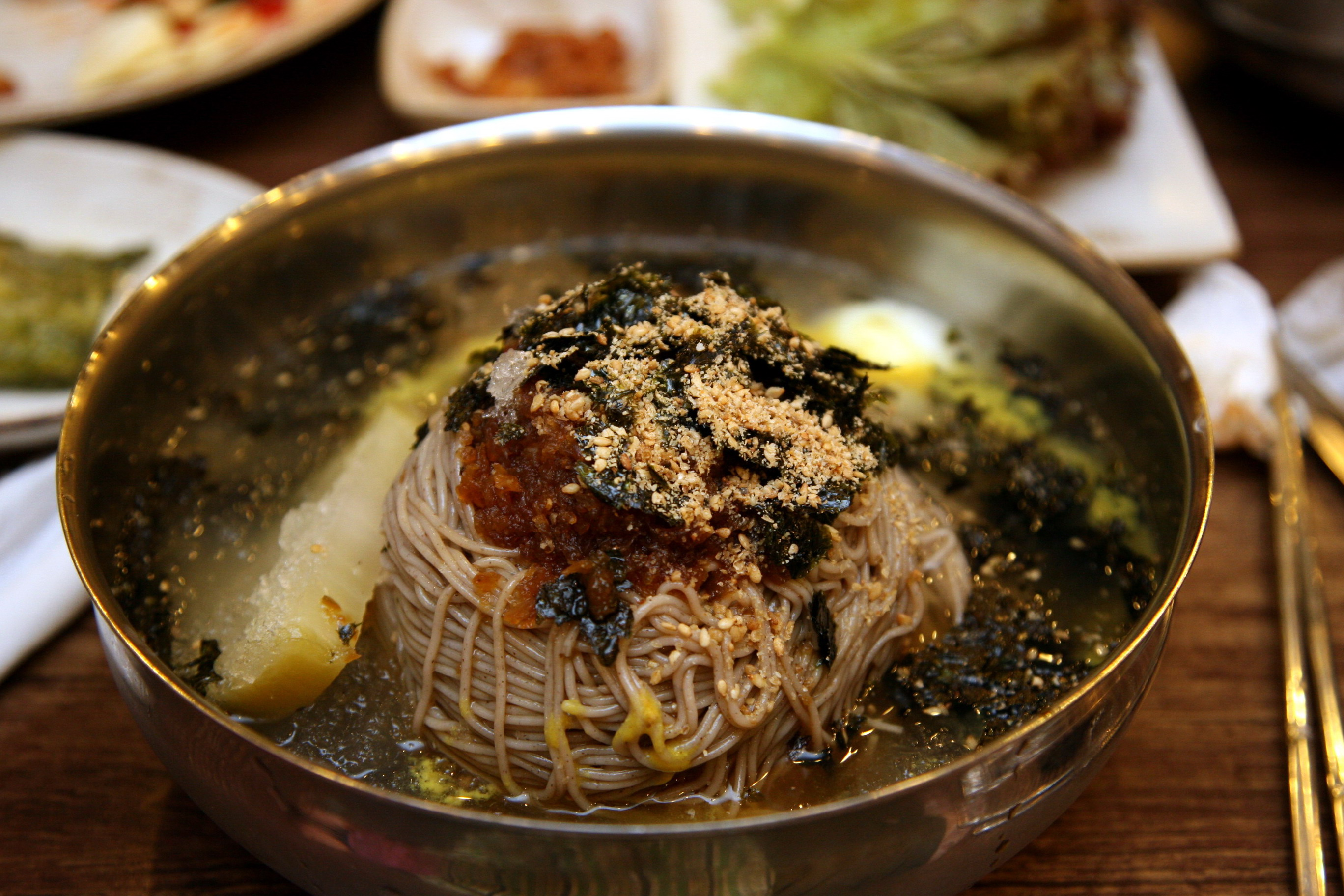
Makguksu, cold buckwheat noodles

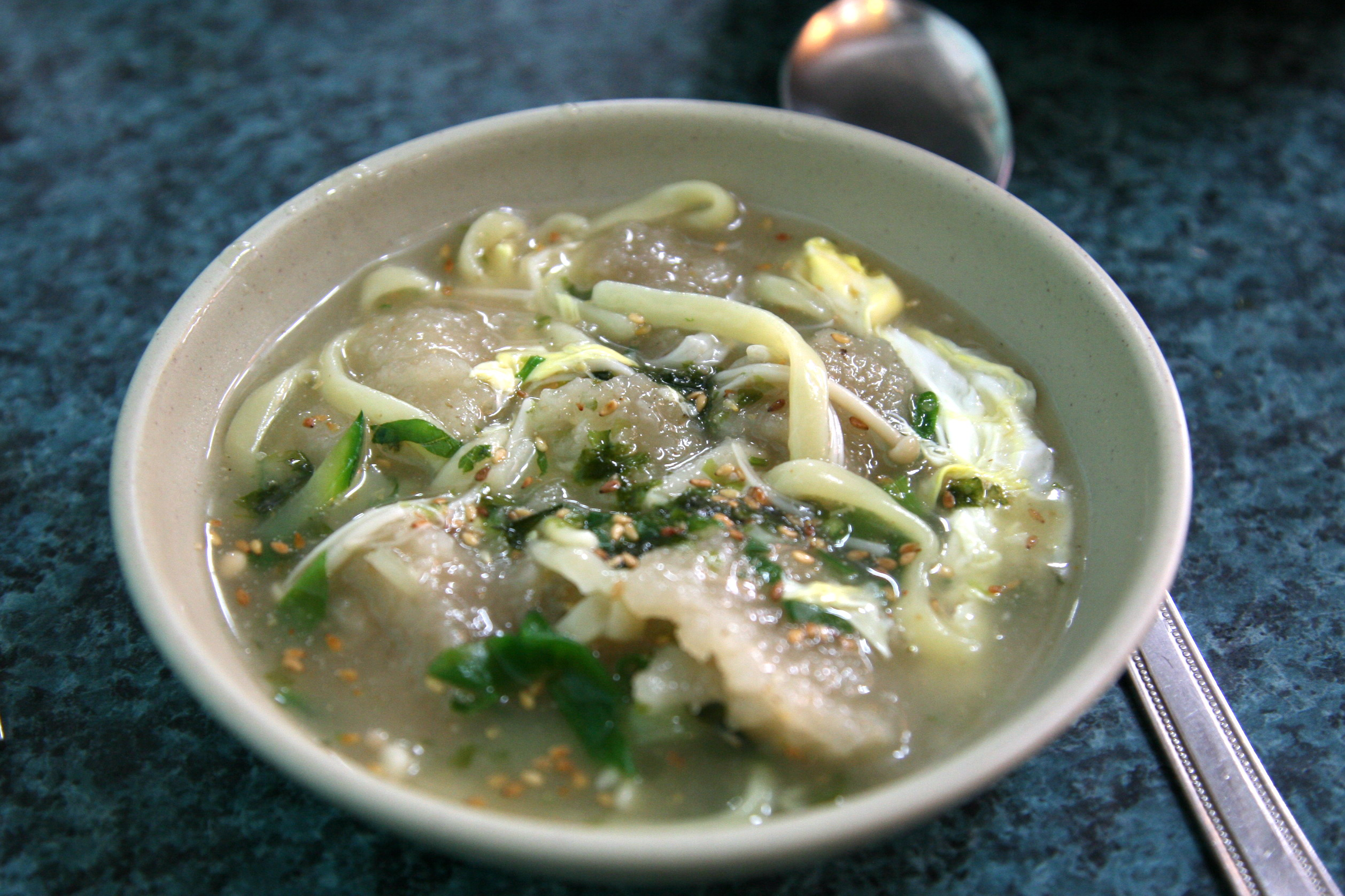
A bowl of gamja ongsimi (potato dumpling soup).

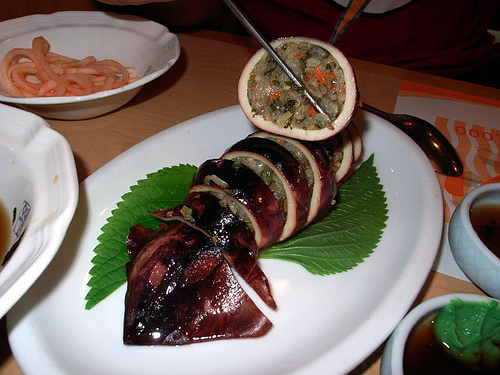
Ojingeo sundae, a variety of sundae (stuffed blood sausage), made with squid and various ingredients

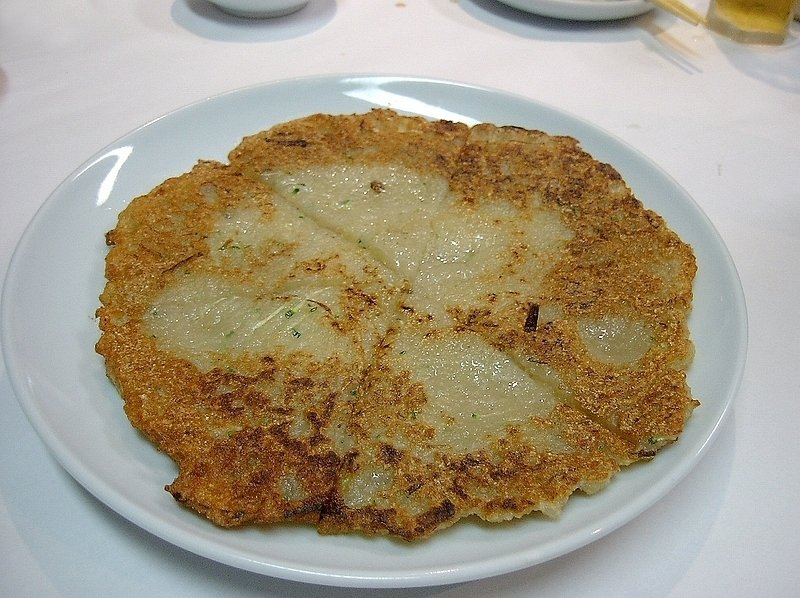
Gamjajeon, potato pancake

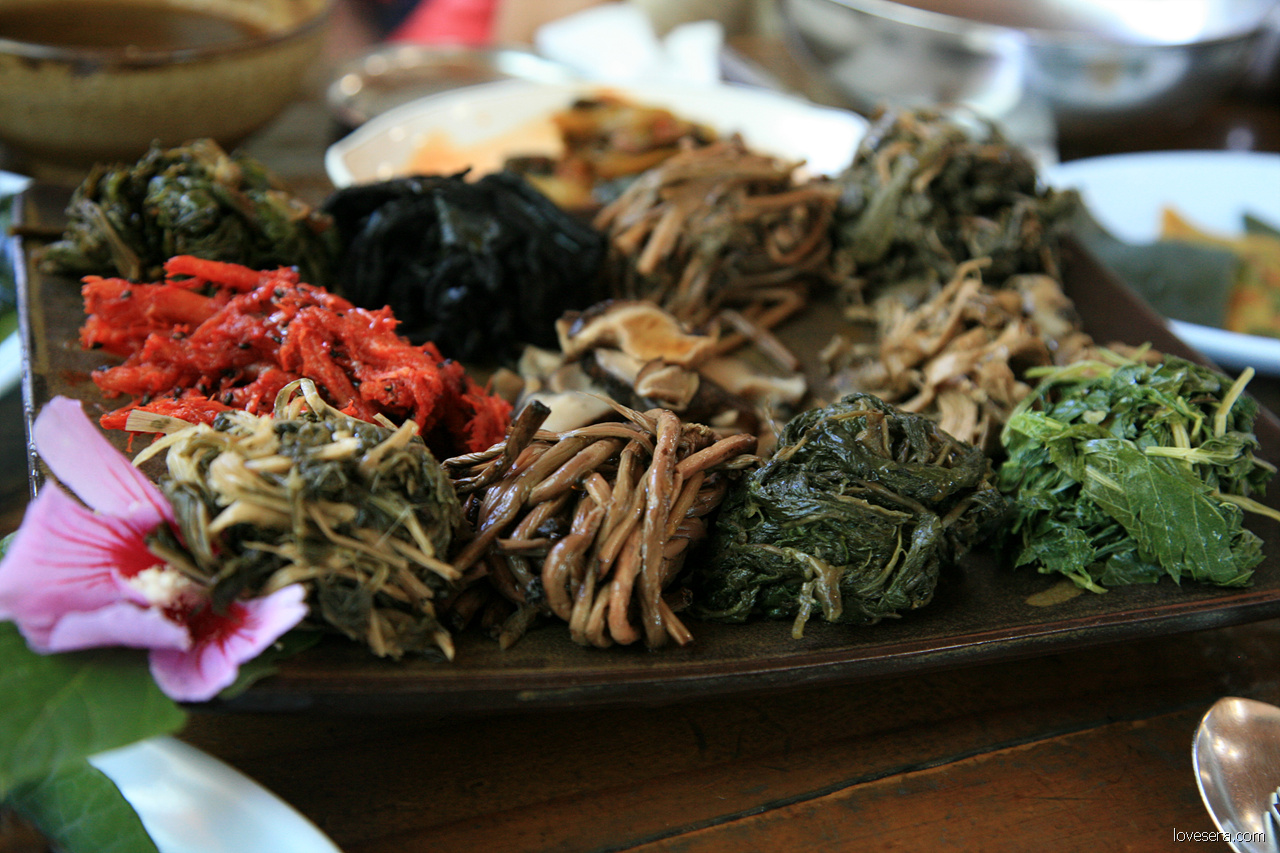
Namul

=== Kaesong ===
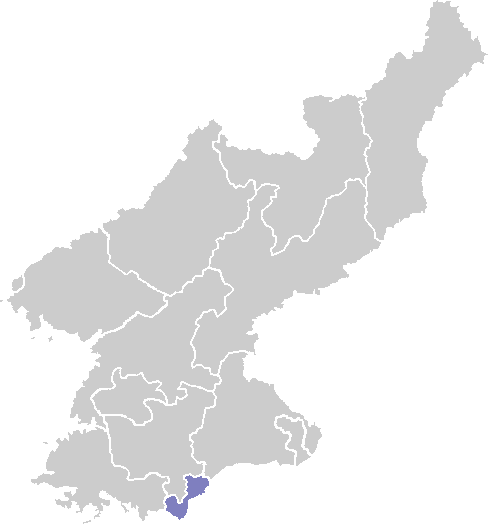
Map of Kaesong.

As Kaesong was the capital of Goryeo for almost 500 years, its culinary culture was highly developed. The luxurious style of Kaesong cuisine is frequently compared with those of Seoul and Jeolla Province. Kaesong cuisine was traditionally treated as part of Gyeonggi cuisine, since Kaesong belonged to Gyeonggi province until the Korean War. However, it was incorporated into the administration of North Korea after the war while Gyeonggi province is administered by South Korea. Bossam kimchi (wrapped kimchi), pyeonsu (summer mandu in square shape), sinseollo (royal casserole), seolleongtang (beef tripe soup), chueotang (mudfish soup), joraengi tteokguk (dumpling soup), umegi (tteok covered with syrup), and gyeongdan (ball-shaped tteok) are representative Kaesong dishes. Umegi, also called Kaesong juak, is a holiday food of Kaesong, and known for its delicate style with a sweet and nutty taste. The dish is made by kneading a mixture of rice flour and glutinous rice flour with warm water, then shaping the dough into balls with either one pine nut or jujube, then frying and coating them with syrup.

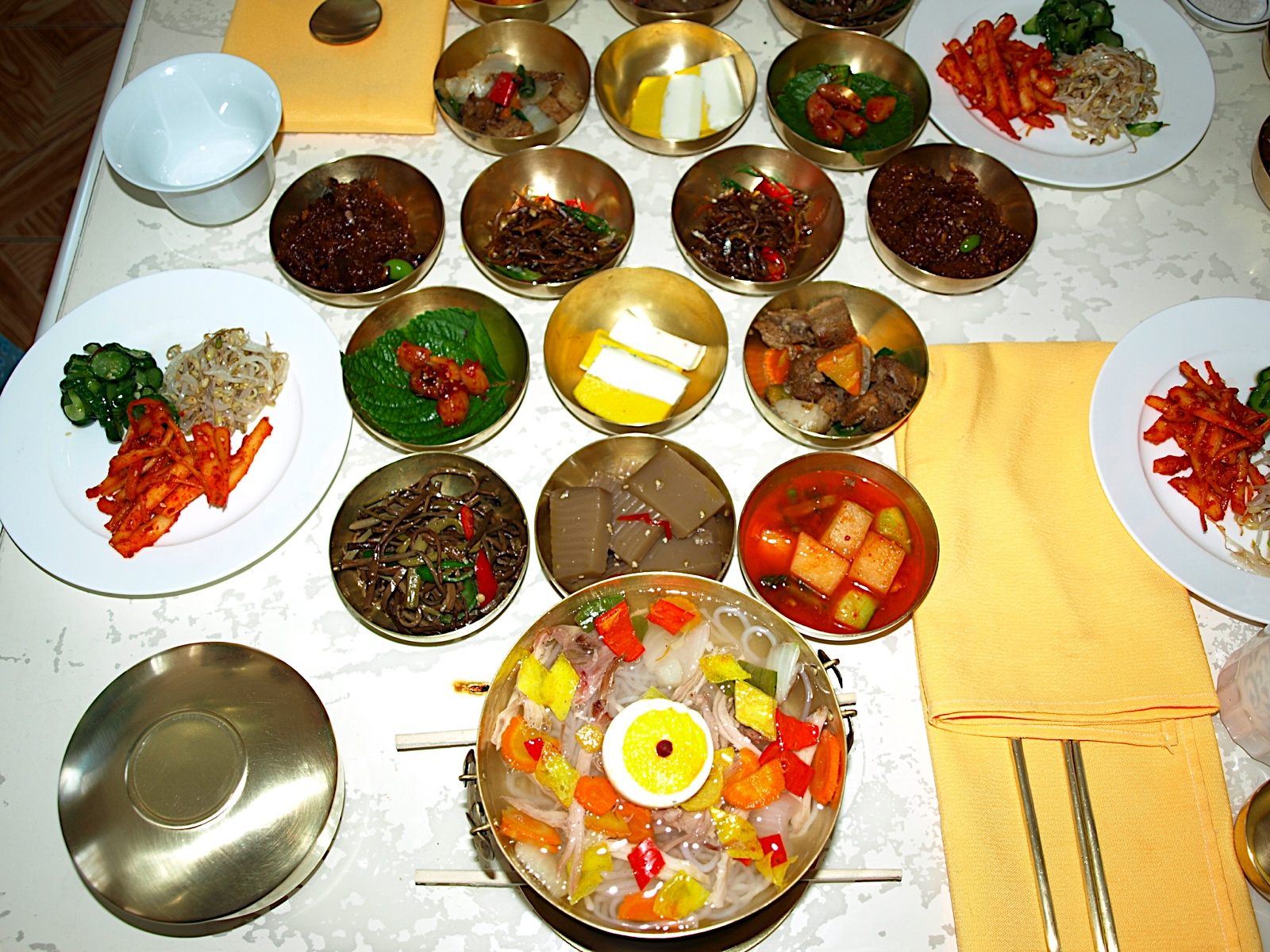
A traditional Kaesong meal.

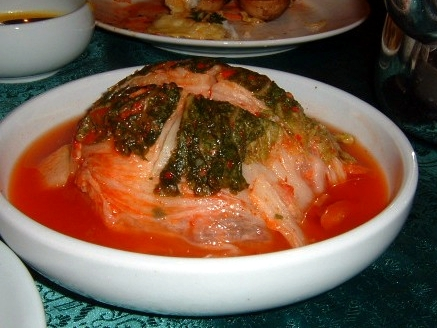
Kaesong bossam kimchi

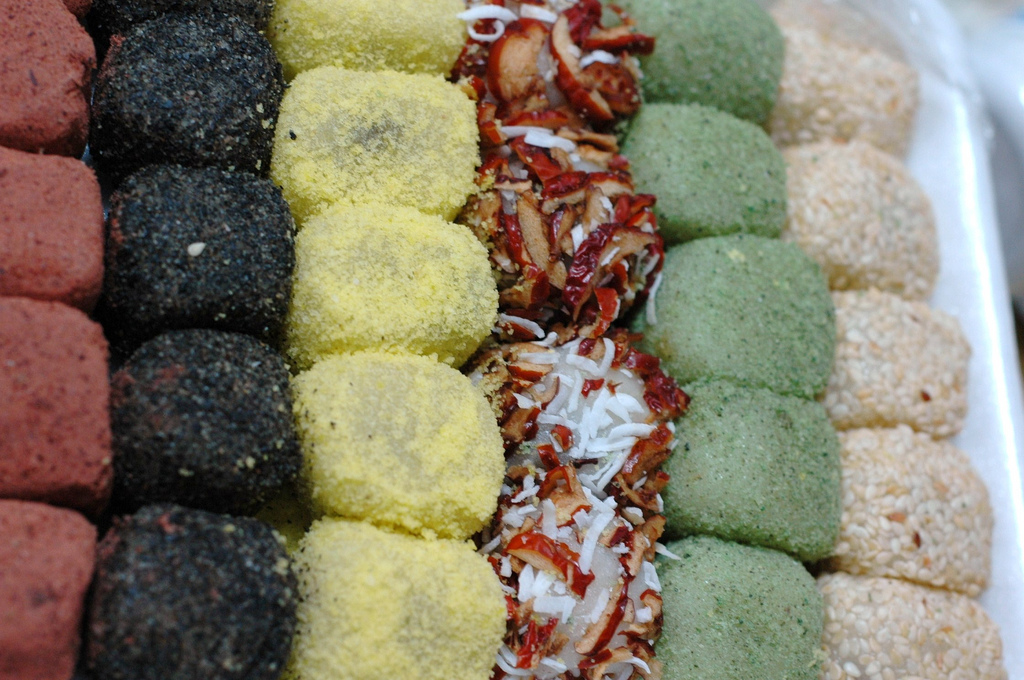
Various gyeongdan, ball-shaped tteok.

=== Gyeonggi province ===
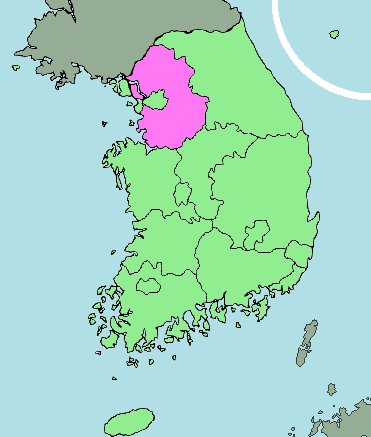
Map of Gyeonggi Province

Geographically, Gyeonggi province is located in the central region of the Korean peninsula. Until the Korean War it included Kaesong, the old capital of Goryeo. Mountain vegetables are obtained from those surrounding Seoul, while fish and seafood are harvested from the Yellow Sea, located to the west. In Gyeonggi cuisine, jeotgal (fermented salted seafood) is abundant, and among them jogijeot (made with croaker) and saeujeot (made with small shrimp) are often used as ingredients in kimchi. The climate is relatively mild, and various types of cereal crops are harvested, so dishes made with grain crops are especially developed. Ogokbap (steamed five cereal crops), and chalbap (steamed glutinous rice) are enjoyed as main dishes. Although the province borders Seoul, its cuisine is generally simple, and its flavors and use of seasonings are moderate except in Kaesong cuisine. Due to the sophisticated culinary culture, and diverse dishes, Kaesong's cuisine is often compared with Seoul's cuisine and Korean royal court cuisine. Since Gyeonggi province borders the provinces of Gangwon Province, Chungcheong, Hwanghae Province, the cuisine has much in common with the cuisines of these neighboring provinces, including flavors and naming conventions for dishes.

Savory grain dishes are numerous, and include sujebi (dumpling soup), and beombeok (thick mixed-grain porridge). They are made with either pumpkin, potato, corn, wheat flour, or azuki beans. Noodle soups such as Jemul guksu (noodles in soybean paste soup), and memilkal ssakdugi (knife-cut noodle soup) also have a thick broth and a savory taste along with a soft texture in contrast with naeongmyeon in the clear dongchimi broth eaten in the northern region. Naengkongguk (soybean soup with dumplings) is also a common dish which is also a local specialty of Chungcheong and Hwanghae provinces.

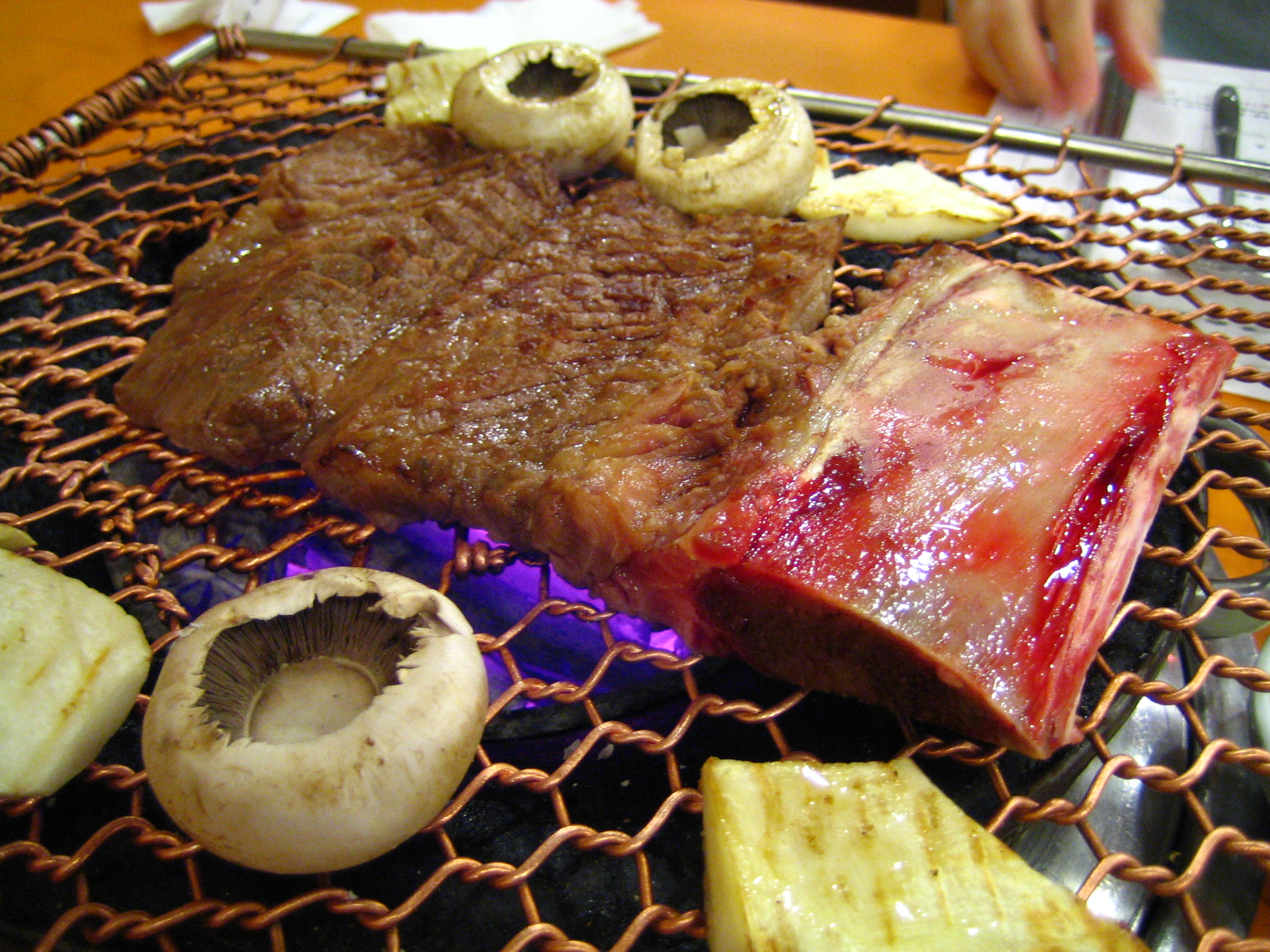
Galbi (grilled short ribs) is a famous dish in Suwon.

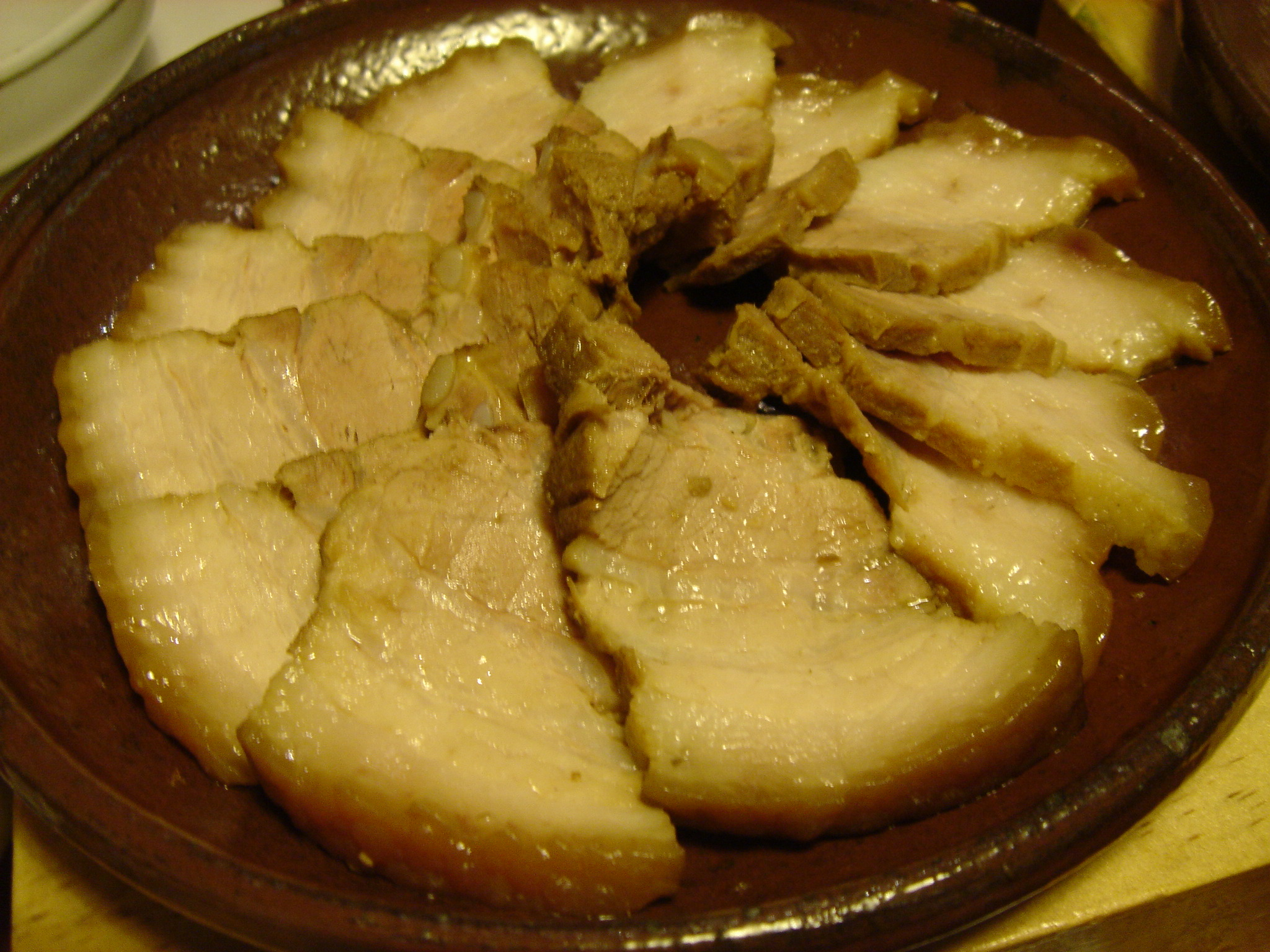
Suyuk, steamed meat

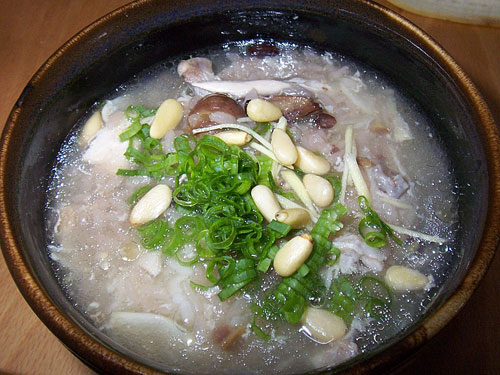
Samgyetang, chicken ginseng soup

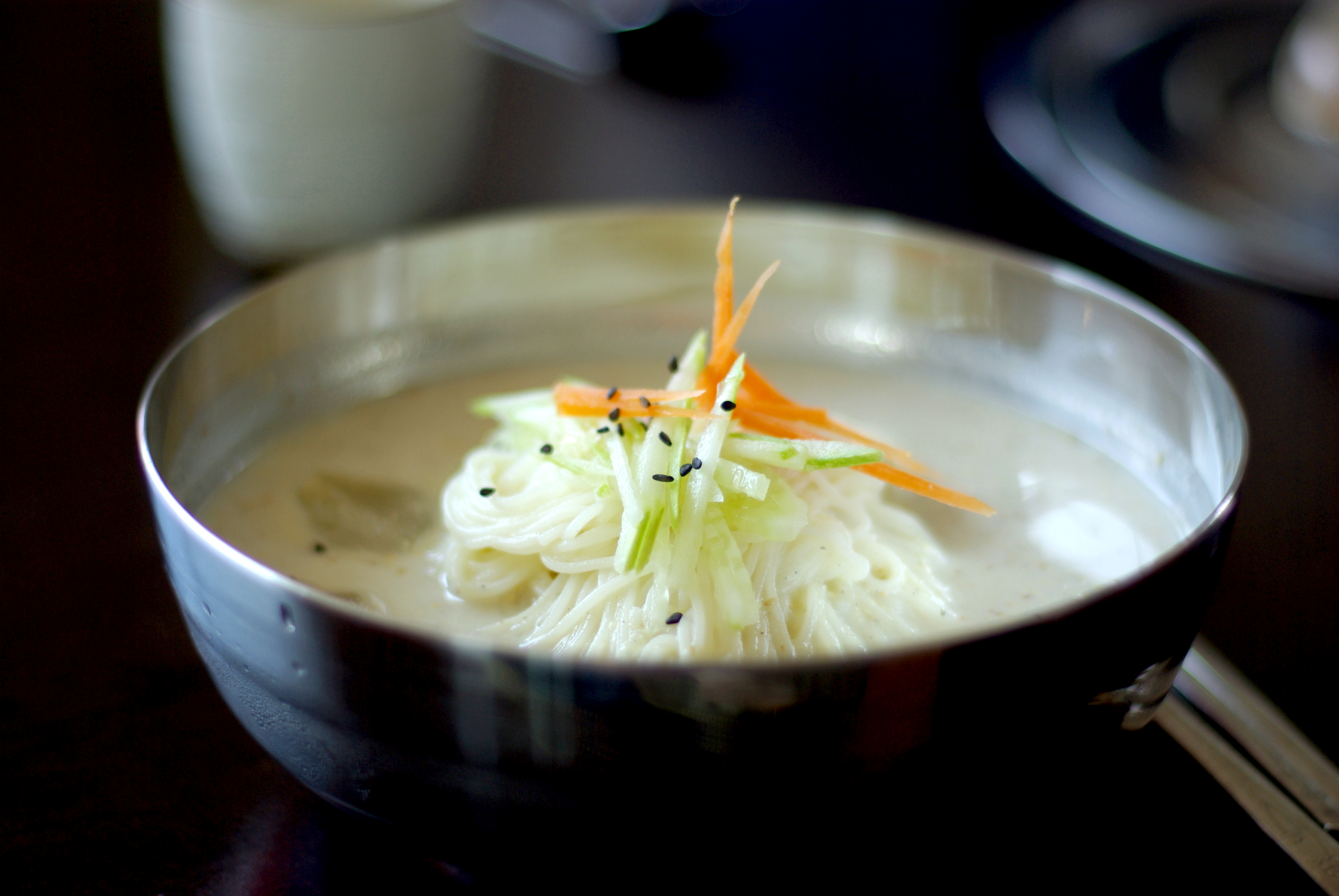
Kongguksu, cold soybean noodle soup

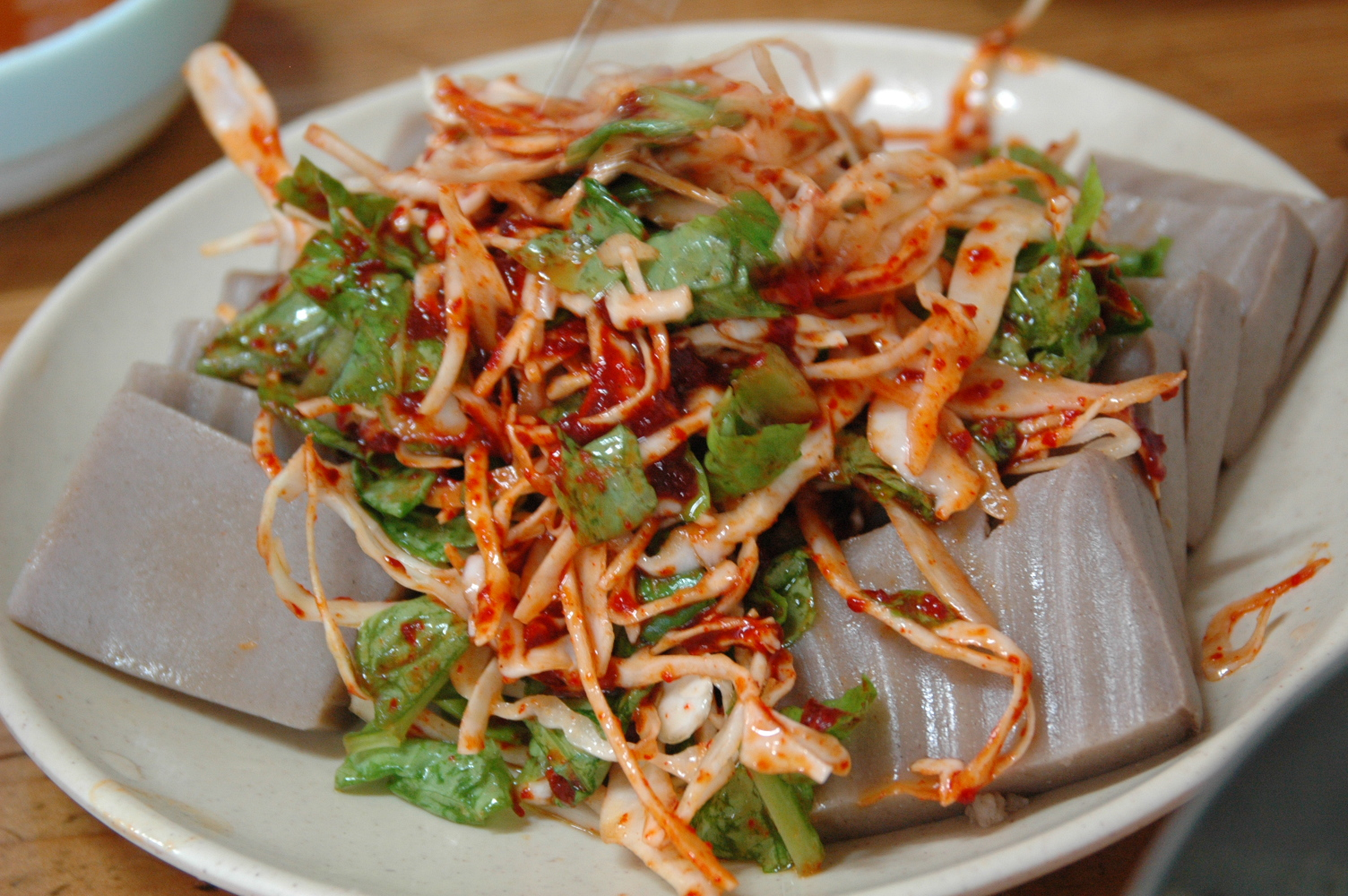
Memilmuk muchim, memilmuk (buckwheat starch jelly) and mixed vegetables

=== Seoul ===
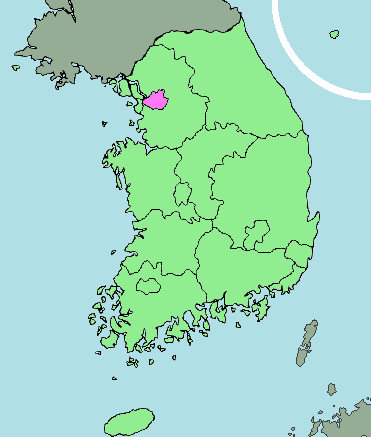
Map of Seoul

Cuisine in the capital city of Seoul is extravagantly presented, and prepared according to strict quality rules. Meals are served in small portions and include many dishes. Their cooking uses many seasonings, but the taste is not overly spicy. Typical main dishes include: seolleongtang (beef soup with rice), gukbap (soup with rice), tteokguk (rice cake soup), heukimjajuk (black sesame porridge), jatjuk (pine nut porridge), memil mandu (dumpling with a buckwheat covering), saengchi mandu (dumpling stuffed with pheasant meat), and pyeonsu (square-shaped mandu with vegetable filling). Among them, seolleongtang is the most widely known Seoul dish, and is also popular nationwide. It is said to be strongly associated with the Seonnongdan shrine in the neighborhood of Jegi-dong, Dongdaemun District, Seoul where the kings of Korea held an annual national ritual to pray for a good harvest. After the ritual everyone gathered to eat a beef soup together, which was made by boiling beef and its tripe in dozens of gamasots (cauldrons) with water.

Representative Seoul soups or stews are: sinseollo (royal casserole), gaksaek jeongol (casserole made with various ingredients), yukgaejang (spicy beef soup with rice), Gujeolpan (nine-sectioned plate), galbijjim (braised meat short ribs), tteokjjim (boiled tteok, beef and vegetables), tteokbokki (stir-fried tteok and vegetables), braised dishes in soy sauce such as honghapcho and jeonbokcho respectively made with mussels and abalone, and gannap (beef liver pancake). Raw dishes such as gaphoe (seasoned raw beef tripe), gulhoe (raw oyster) are also part of Seoul cuisine. Pressed or dried dishes such as pyeonyuk made with ox's tongue or brisket, jokpyeon (gelatin), eochae (parboiled fish fillet), yukpo (beef jerky), suran (poached egg), sukju namul (sauteed mung bean spouts), mugeun namul bokkeum (sauteed dried various mountain vegetables), hobakseon (steamed stuffed zucchini), gimssam (wraps with gim, seaweed), maedeup jaban (fried kelp in a ribbon shape), are banchan representing Seoul cuisine. Gujeolpan and sinseollo especially demonstrate the sophisticated style of Seoul cuisine. Dried fish such as gulbi (dried salted yellow croaker), gwamegi (half-dried Pacific herring or Pacific saury), amchi (dried salted brown croaker) are grilled or pan-fried to make jeon, Korean style pancakes. Seoul cuisine has a lot of mitbanchan (basic side dishes made for preservation) such as yukpo (beef jerky), jeotgal (salted fermented seafood) and jangajji (pickles). Unique kimchi found in Seoul are jang kimchi (water kimchi seasoned with soy sauce,) and suk kkakdugi (kimchi made with parboiled radish).

During the Joseon period, the villages of Bukchon and Namchon were referred to as "Namju Byukbyeong", which literally means "Namchon for alcoholic beverages, Bukchon for tteok" (rice cakes), because tteok were made on many occasions in Seoul. There are many tteok made with high-quality ingredients, that take a lot of work to produce, in Seoul cuisine such as danja. It is usually used as a decoration for other tteok and is shaped into a ball or a square after its dough is pounded and stuffed with a sweetened filling and covered with gomul (powder coating or sliced fruits). The danja varieties are made with jujube, Artemisia princeps var. orientalis (sunflower-like plant), chestnut, yuzu (a citrus fruit), Gingko seeds, gotgam (dried persimmon), Coix lacryma-jobi var. ma-yuen (a grain), and seogi (a lichen - Umbilicaria esculenta). Other typical tteok include: duteop tteok covered with azuki bean crumbles, sangchu tteok made with lettuce, gaksaekpyeon made by adding color or flavors, neuti tteok made with young leaves of Zelkova serrata, yaksik made with nuts and jujubes, hwajeon made with flower petals, juak made by pan-frying and honey-glazing, mulhobak tteok made with pumpkin, and solbangul tteok made with pine cones.

Typical hangwa or Korean confectioneries are yakgwa, mandugwa, maejakgwa, and various types of yeotgangjeong and dasik. Both yakgwa and maejakgwa are fried pastries made with wheat flour and honey each having a distinctive shape and texture; the former with a flower pattern shape and a soft texture; the latter in a ribbon shape with a crispy texture. Mandugwa is a confectionery made by frying a dumpling filled with sweetened jujube. Yeotgangjeong, or taffy rice cracker, is covered with sesame seeds, peanuts, or ground pine nuts. Dasik is a pattern pressed cake eaten when drinking tea, made with black sesame seeds, soybean, pollen powders, chestnut, starch, rice or a mixture of wheat flour and honey.

Various hwachae (Korean punch) and teas are also part of Seoul cuisine. Hwachae is eaten cold and made with fruits (e.g. omija hwachae), edible flower petals (e.g. jindallae hwachae), tteok (e.g. wonsobyeong), steamed grains (e.g. bori sudan), or traditional medical ingredients. Examples of fruit teas are: yujacha, mogwacha, omijacha, gugijacha, and daechucha. On the other hand, typical herbal teas can be made with spices like ginger and cinnamon, herbs such as Ginseng radicle, Angelica, or grains such as Senna obtusifolia. At royal court, jehotang was considered the best summer drink. This cold drink is made with honey, water, and the powders of dried and roasted Prunus mume fruits, Amomi Semen, Sandalwood Red, and Amomum tsao-ko. Ogwacha, which literally means "five fruits", is made with walnuts, chestnuts, Gingko seeds, jujube, and ginger.

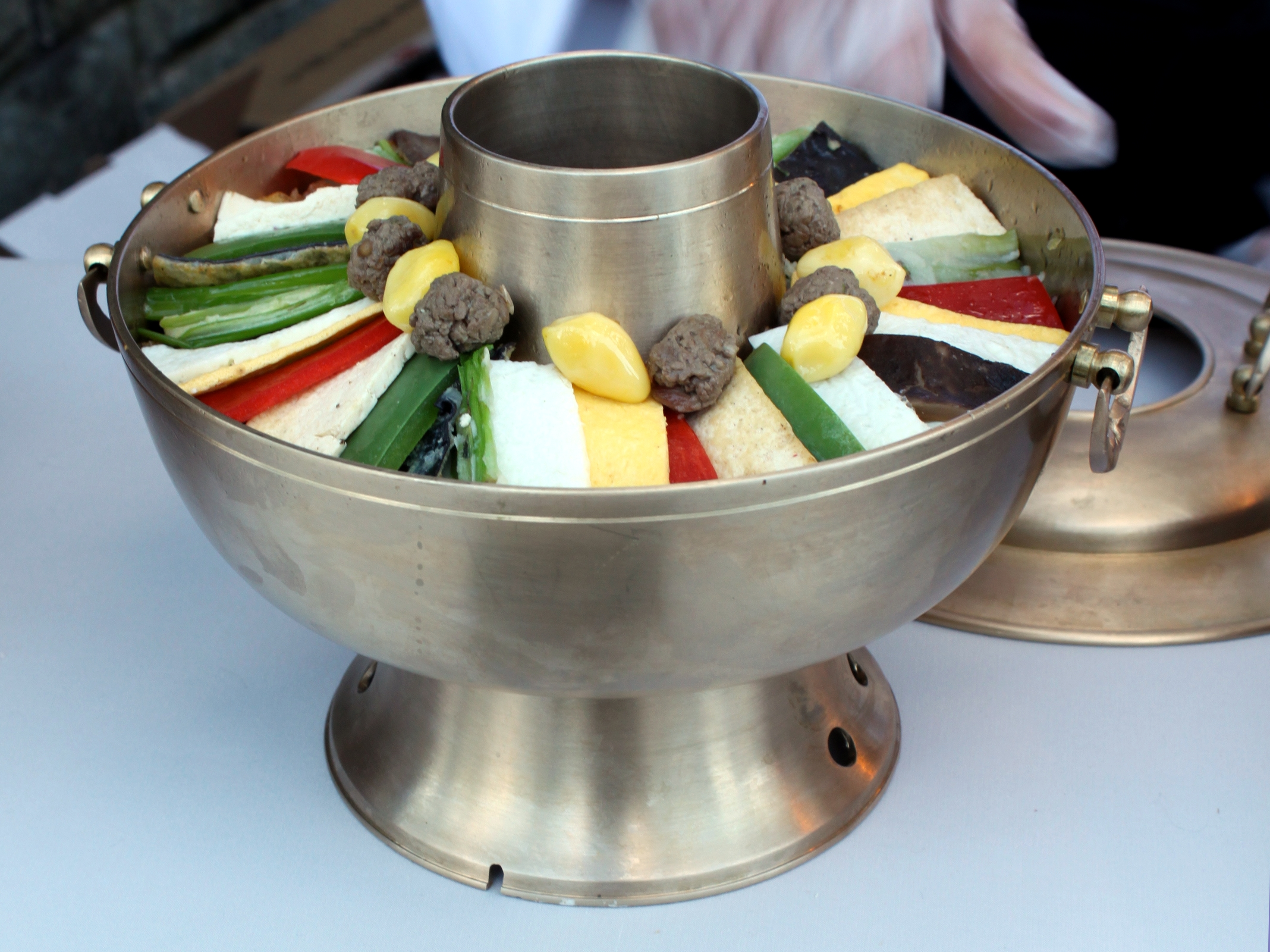
Sinseollo, royal casserole

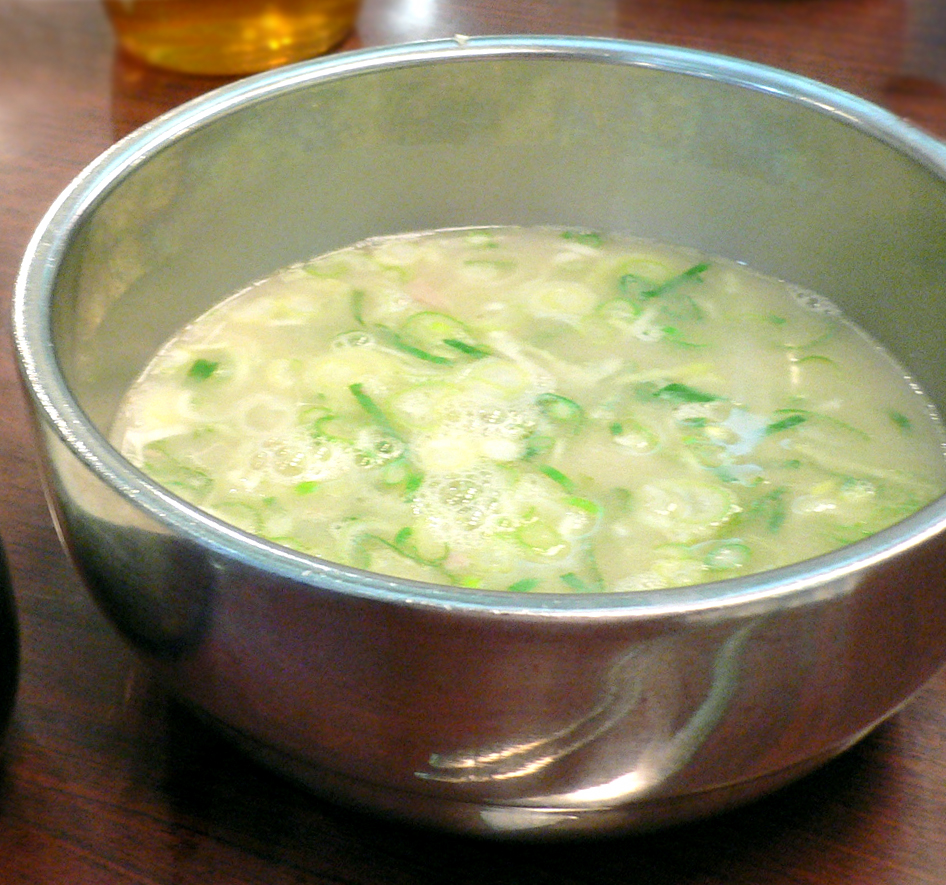
Seolleongtang

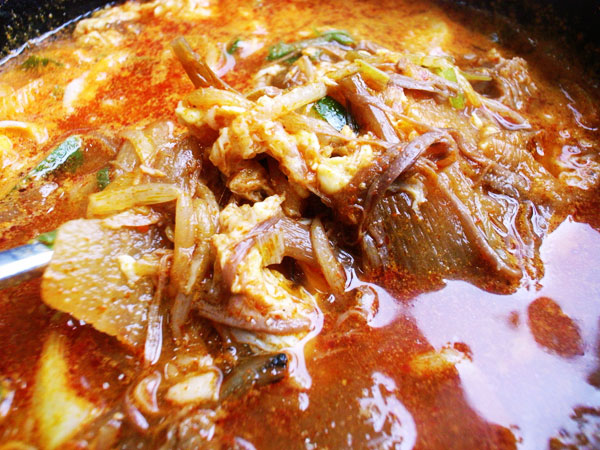
Yukgaejang

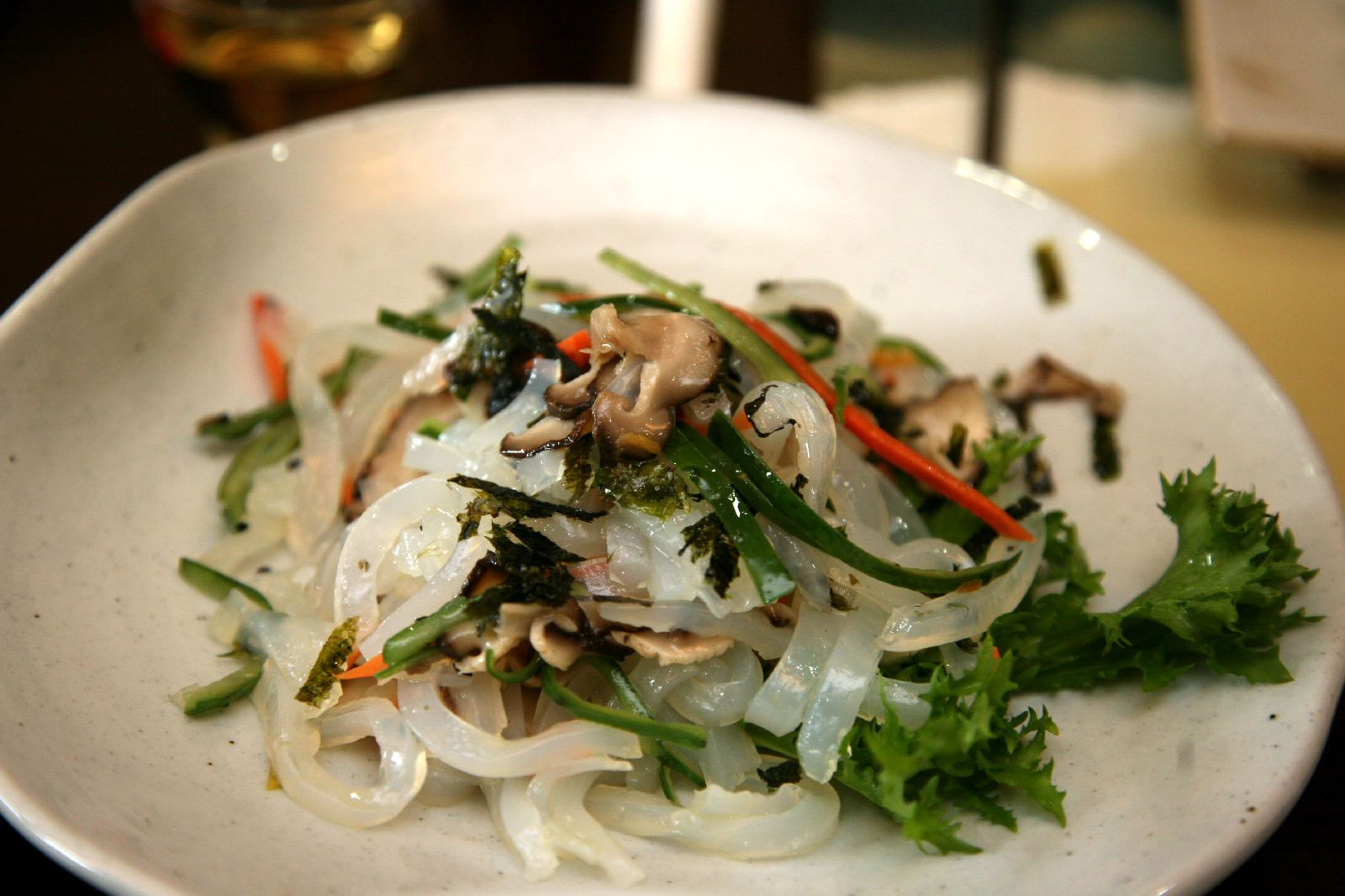
Tangpyeongchae, shredded mung bean jelly with vegetables

=== Chungcheong province ===
Chungcheong consists of the provinces of North Chungcheong, which is landlocked, and South Chungcheong, which faces the Yellow Sea to its west. Although there are many differences between the two provinces' geographical conditions, the locals in both generally engage in agriculture as their primary occupation. The Yedang Plain, in the area adjacent to the Baengma River in South Chungcheong province provides an abundant harvest of grain crops, while the Yellow Sea is a good fishery. During the Three Kingdoms period of Korea (57 BC – 668 AD), barley and millet were the respective main dishes for the Silla kingdom (57 BC–935) and the Goguryeo kingdom (37 BC–668), whereas rice was assumed to have been the main grain for the Baekje kingdom (18 BC–660). Chungcheong province was the home province of Baekje.

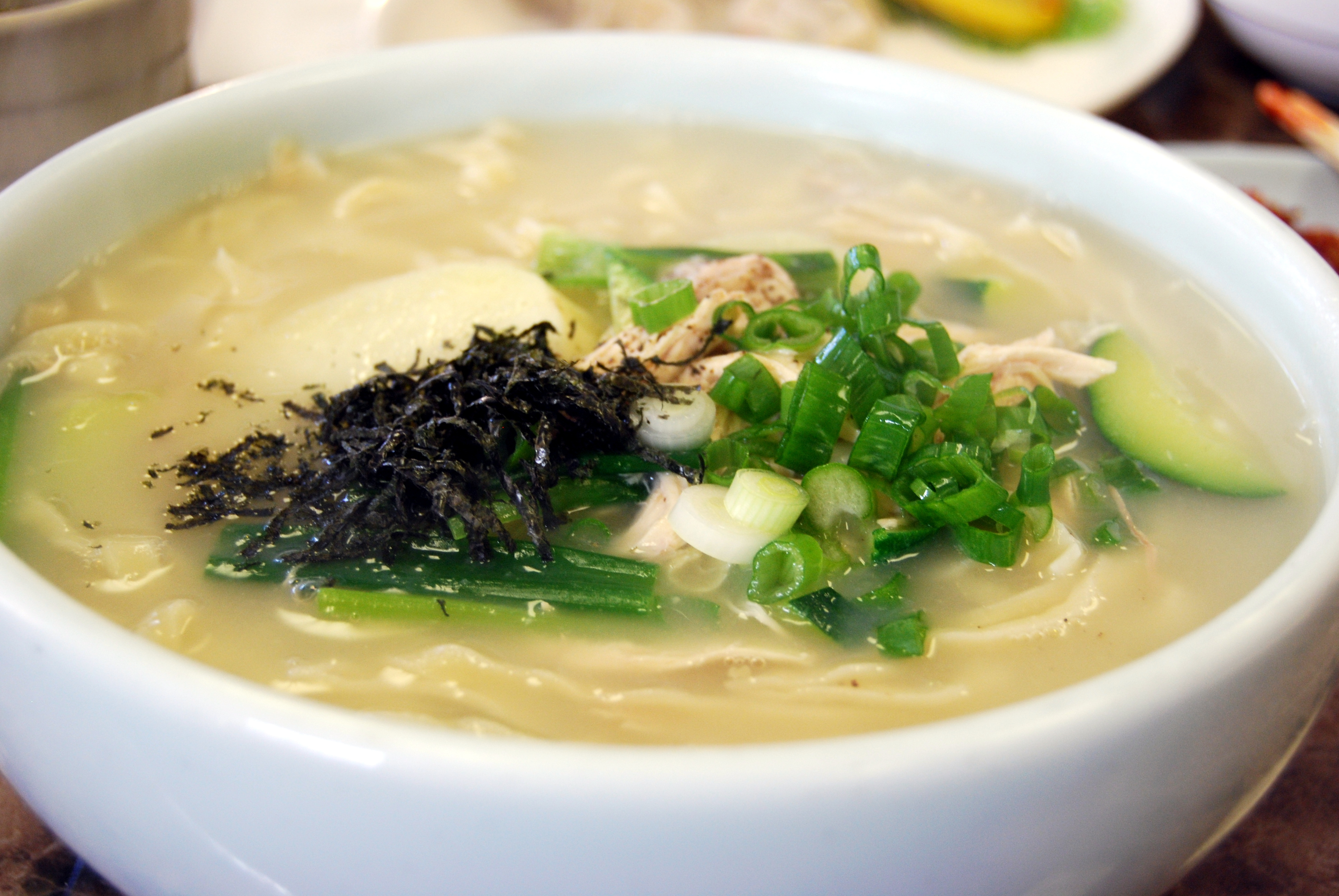
Kalguksu, knife-cut noodle soup

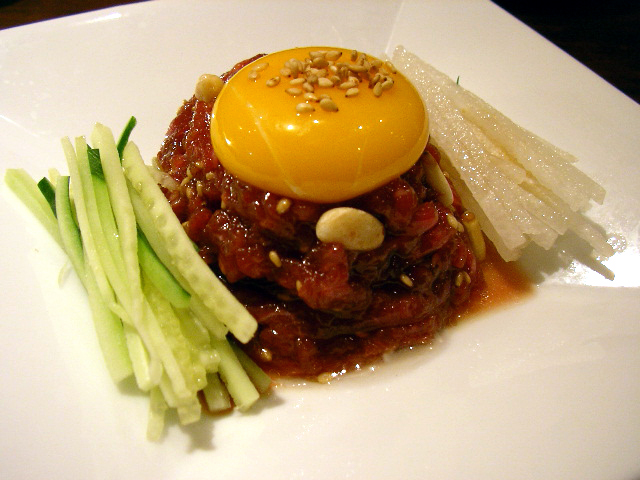
Yukhoe, raw seasoned beef

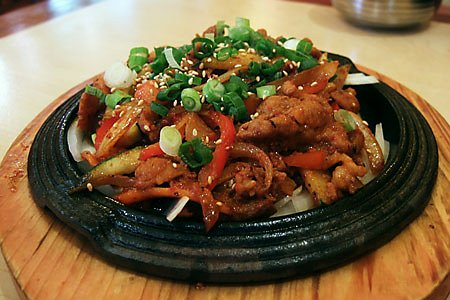
Jeyuk bokkeum, stir-fried pork in gochujang (chili pepper paste)

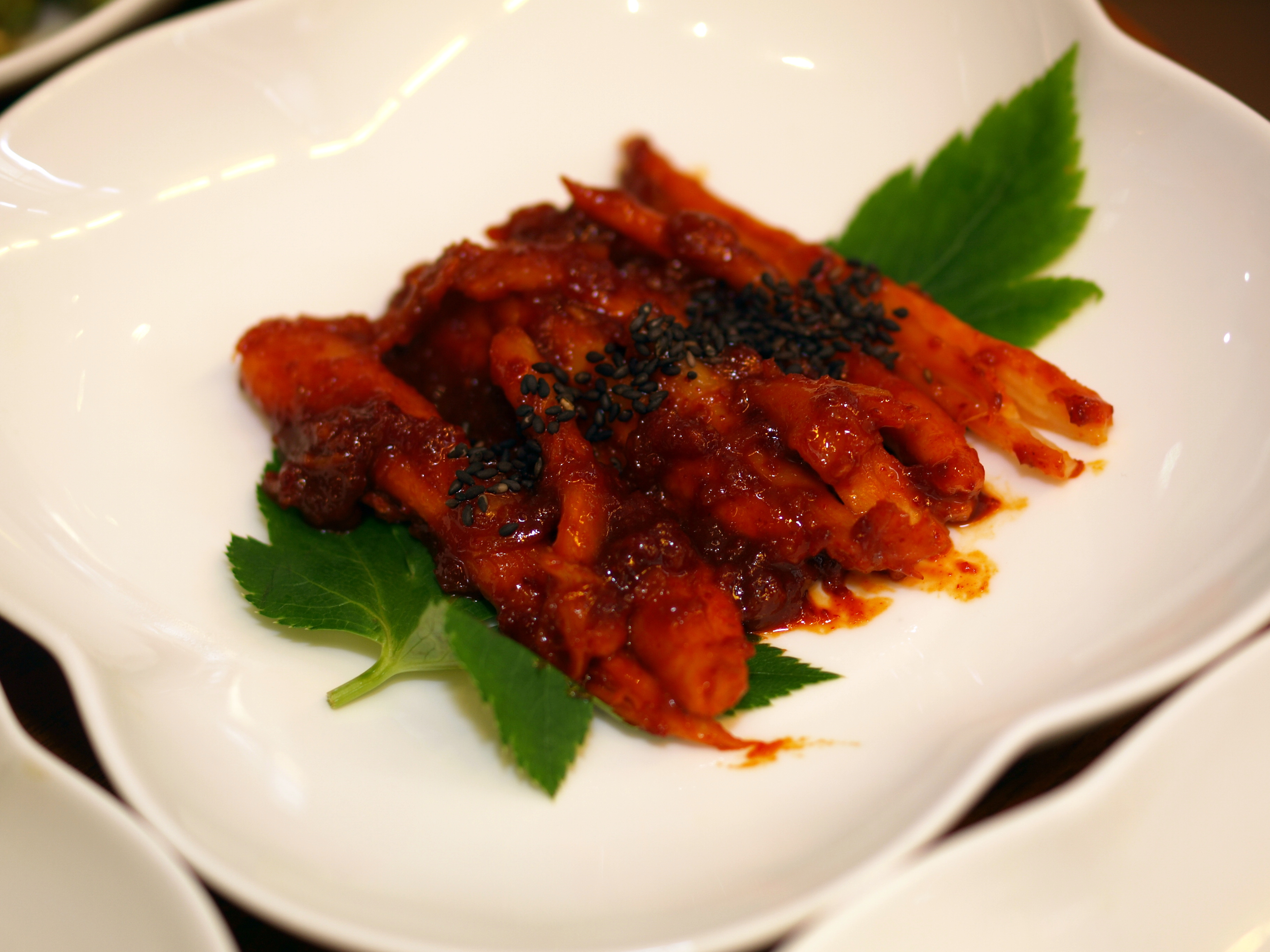
Deodeok gui, grilled Codonopsis lanceolata

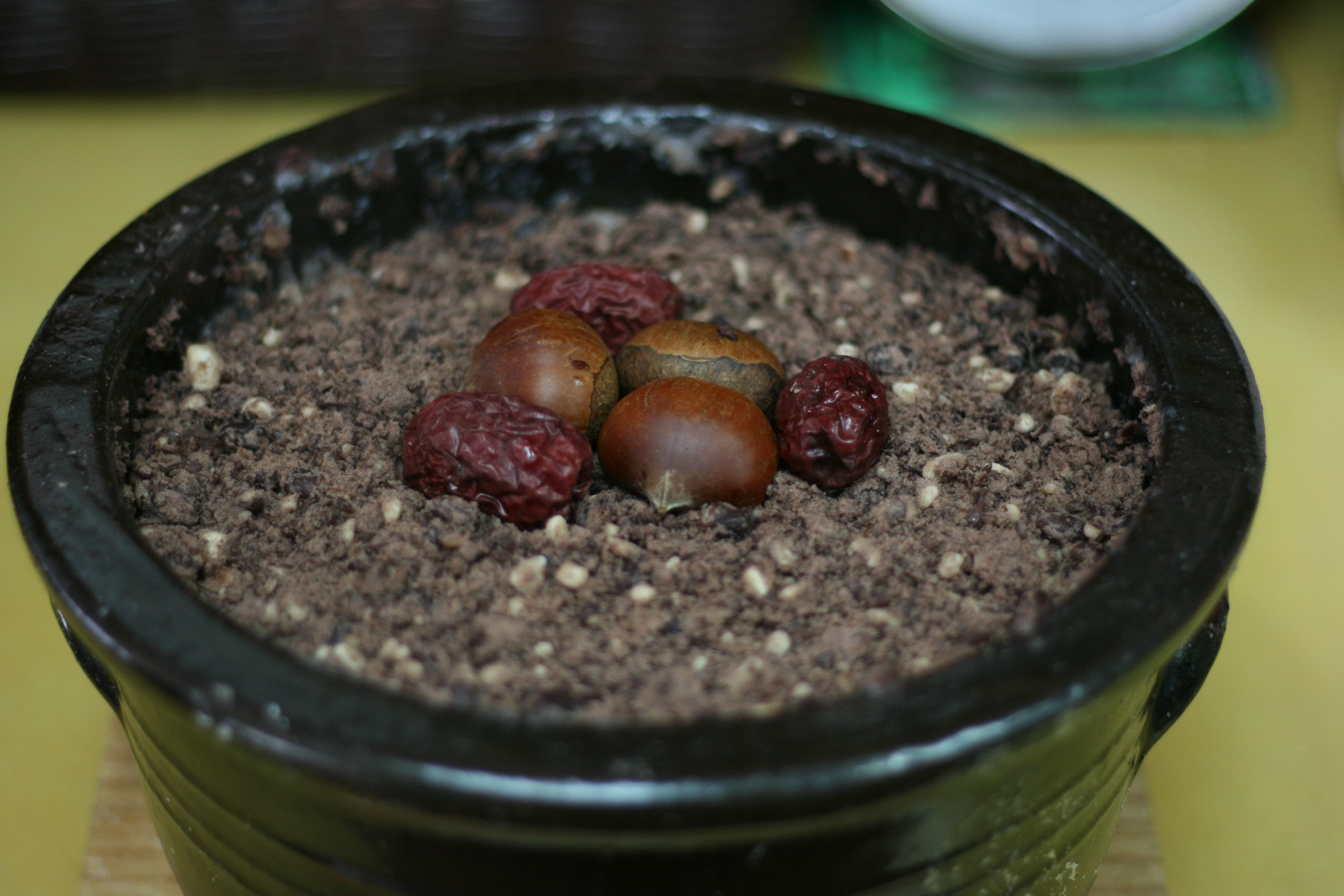
Pat sirutteok, steamed rice cake covered with azuki bean crumbles

== Southern region ==
=== Jeolla province ===
The cuisine of the southwestern region of Jeolla, consisting of the provinces of North and South Jeolla, is famous for its rich and sumptuous style, comparable with Kaesong's cuisine. While Kaesong cuisine, which retains the tradition of the Goryeo Dynasty, is very conservative, Jeolla cuisine preserves a unique culinary tradition that has been handed from Yangban (noble class) of the Joseon Dynasty. Jeolla region includes the fertile Honam Plain that provides an abundant harvest of rice. The Yellow Sea and East China Sea which are adjacent to the west and east offer a variety of seafood for the table.

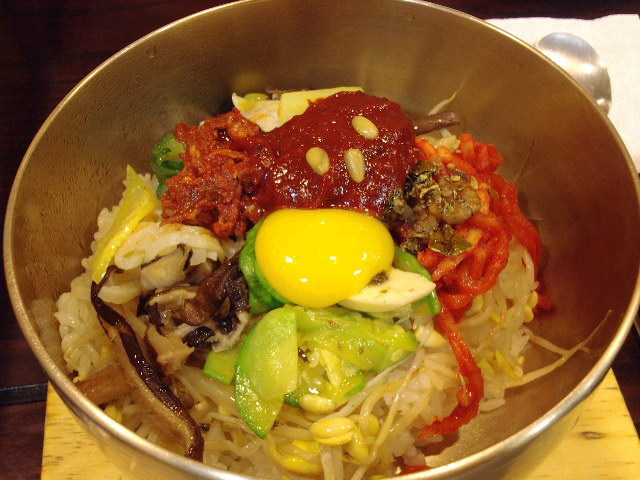
Jeonju bibimbap, a variety of bibimbap (mixed rice with vegetables).

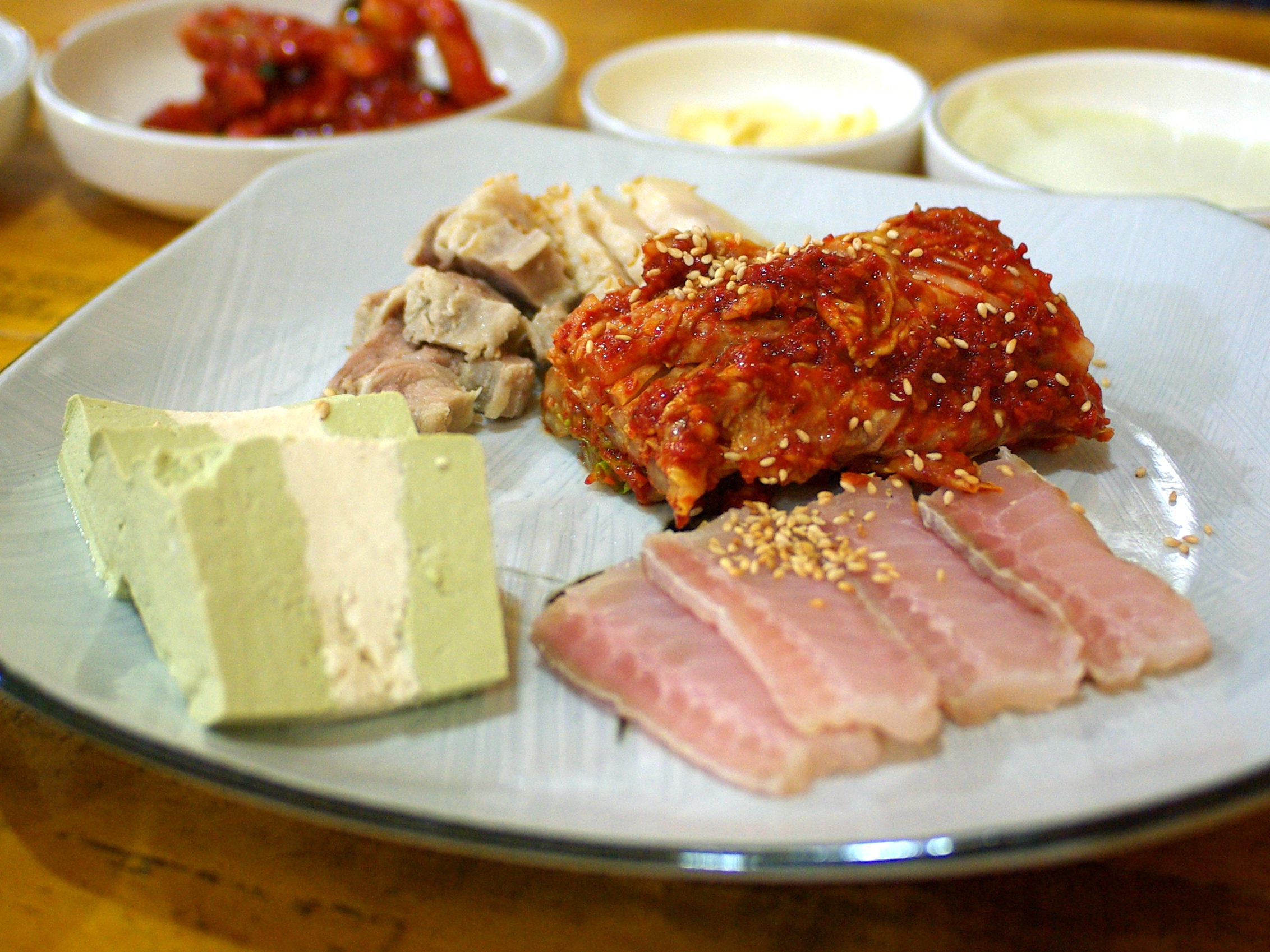
Samhap (lit.three combination) consists of cooked pork, kimchi, and hongeohoe (fermented raw Raja Kenojei)

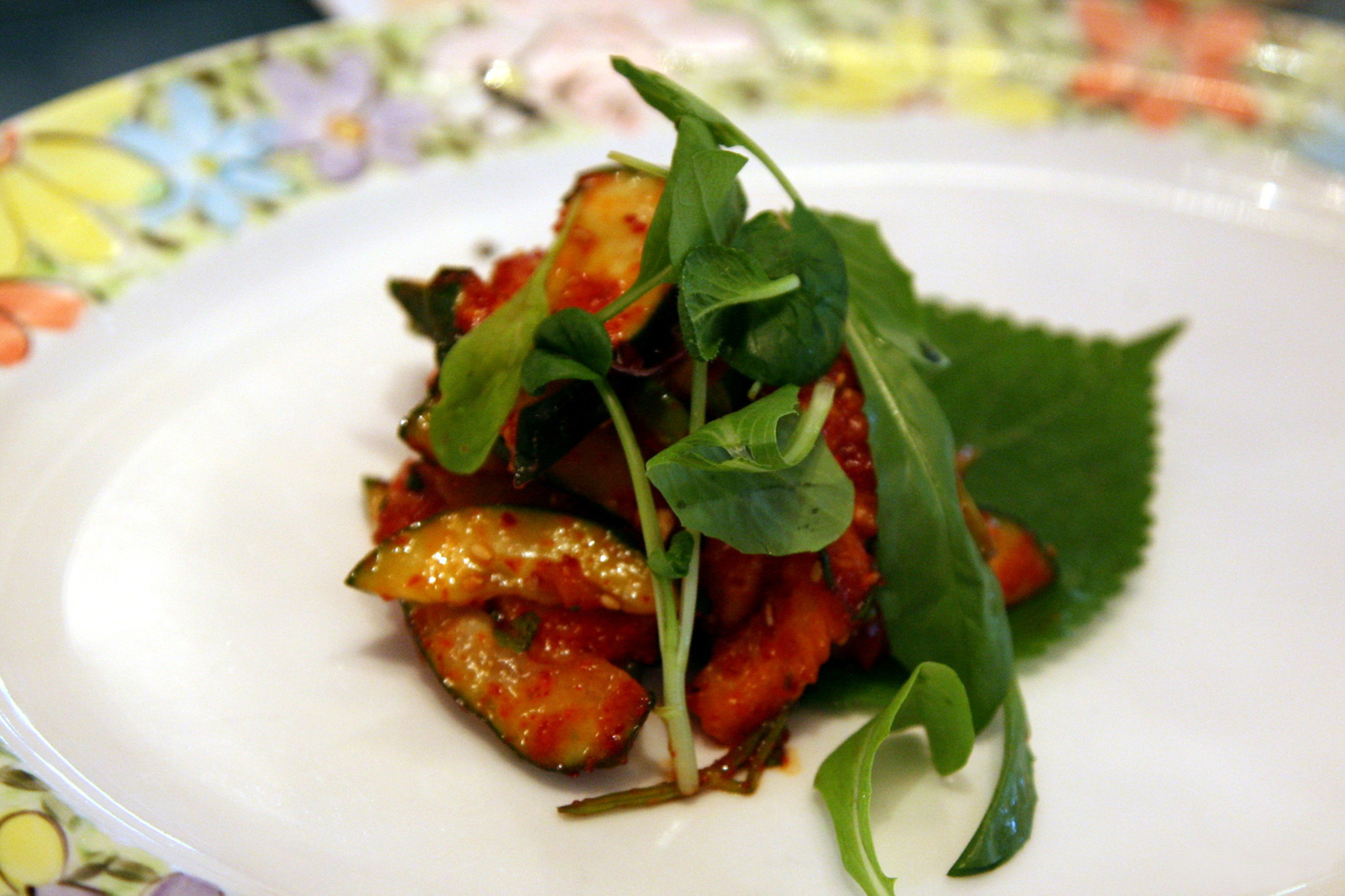
Hongeohoe chomuchim, Raja Kenojei seasoned with a sour and hot and spicy sauce

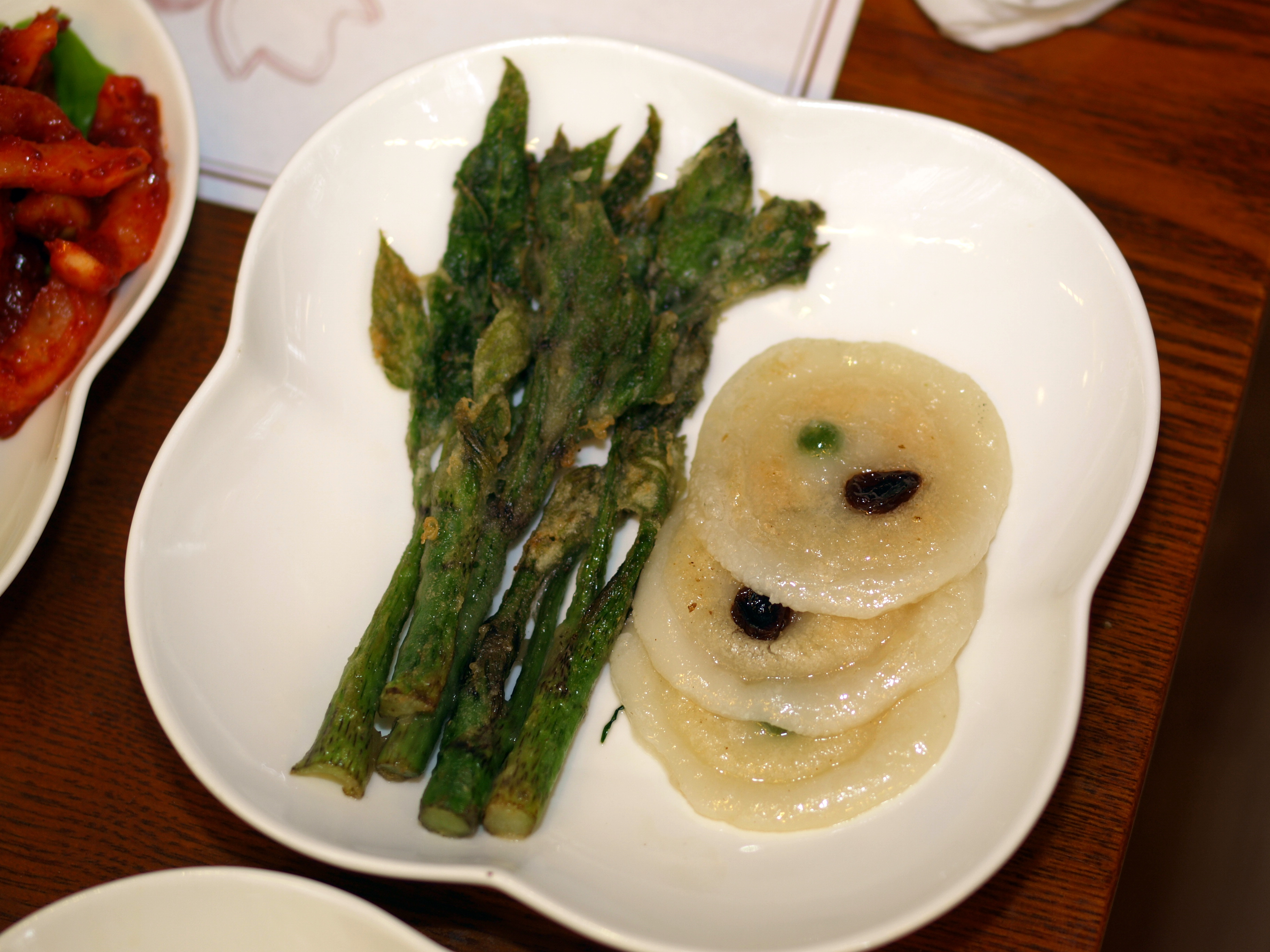
Dureup bugak (fried shoots of Aralia elata) and chal jeonbyeong (glutinous rice pancake)

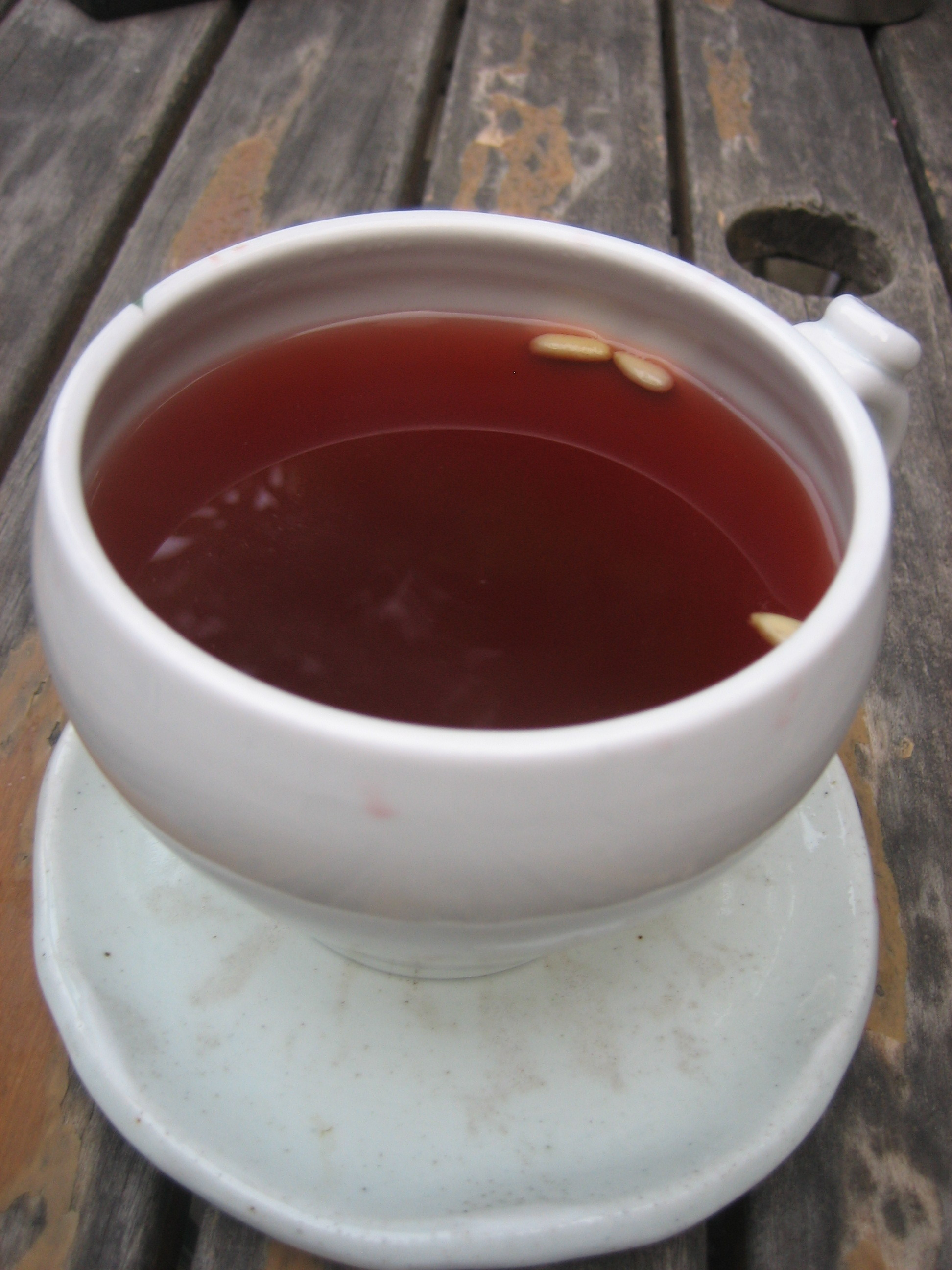
Sujeonggwa, persimmon punch

=== Gyeongsang province ===
Gyeongsang cuisine is based on Gyeongsang Province, consisting of the North and South Gyeongsang Provinces. The region has a similar climate to that of Jeolla Province because both geographically border two seas—Gyeongsang province borders the Sea of Japan (East Sea) to the east, and the East China Sea to the south. However, the types of fish harvested are different. Fish are regarded as the best foodstuff in Gyeongsang cuisine. Seafood is variously cooked in the cuisine, and especially hoe (raw sliced seafood, is considered the best delicacy. Soups made with fresh fish are common in Gyeongsang province, unlike other mountainous and landlocked regions. Myeolchi jeot (fermented salted anchovies) is the most commonly prepared jeotgal (fermented salted seafood); the number of jeotgal-type dishes placed on the table for a meal is second only to those prepared in Jeolla province. The style of Gyeongsang cuisine is simple with less decoration, while various seasonings are used heavily, so the taste is even more salty and hot and spicy than Jeolla's. Diverse grains can be grown in the province and noodles are the most enjoyed dish among the foods made with grains. The locals prefer noodles with a soft texture made by mixing raw soybean powder, cut by a kitchen knife. Andong, a city that was once the center of Korea's Confucianist traditions, has a wide variety of local delicacies. Along with Andong jjimdak, it is the birthplace of heotjesabap (fake jesa food), Andong soju, salted mackerel, and a spicy variety of sikhye (a fermented rice drink).

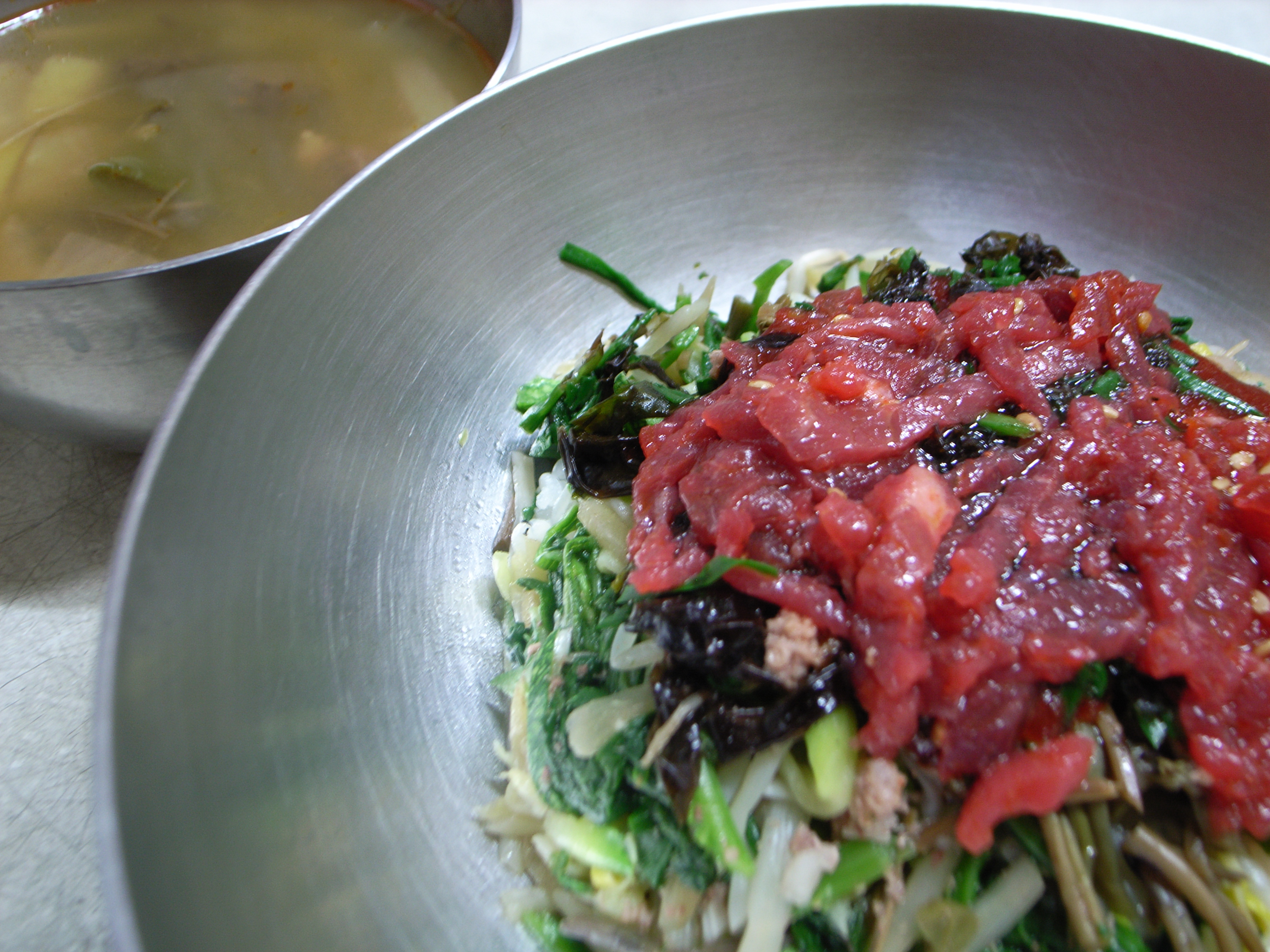
Jinju bibimbap, a variety of bibimbap originating in Jinju

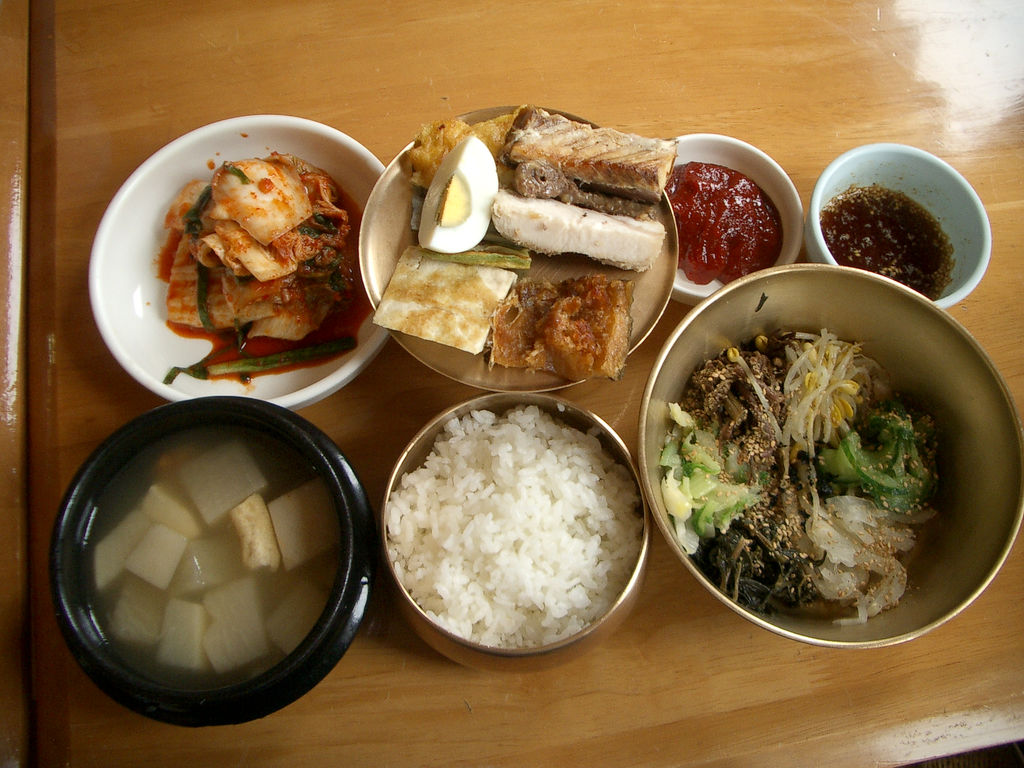
Heotjesabap, a variety of bibimbap originating in Andong

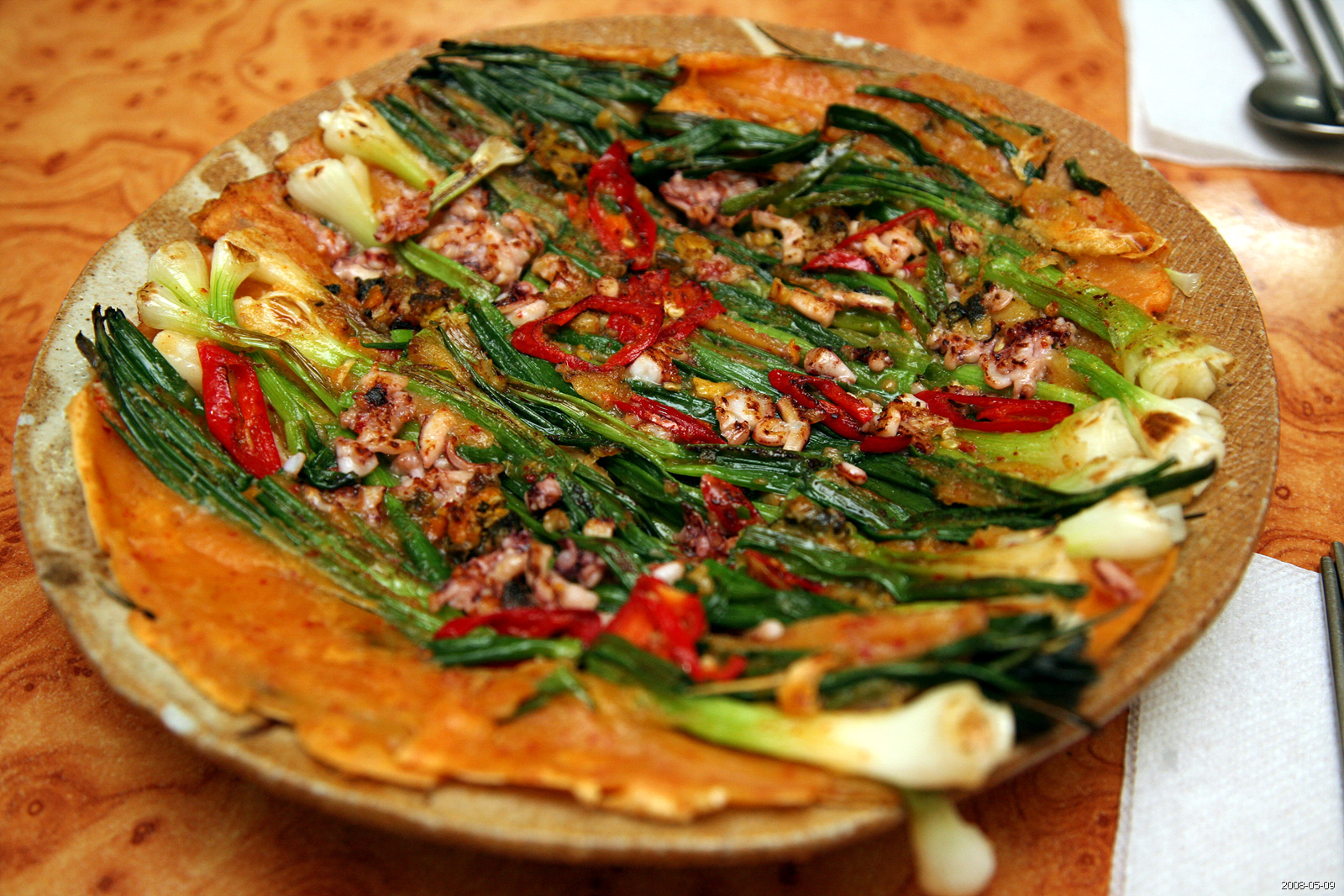
Dongnae pajeon, green scallion pancake, a local specialty of Busan.

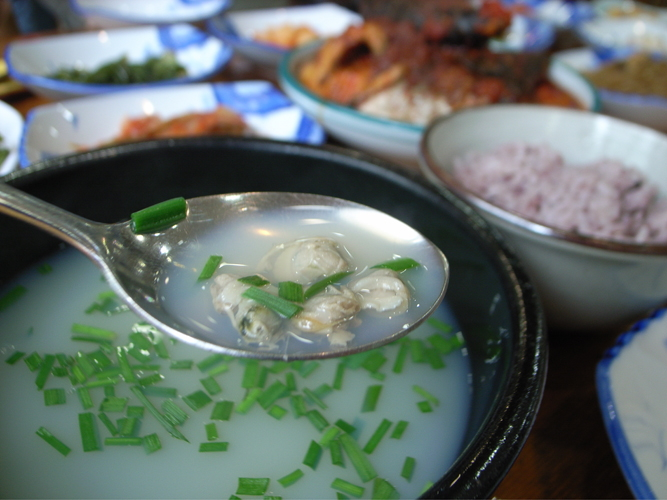
Jaecheopguk, a clear soup made with small freshwater clams called jaecheop (재첩, Corbicula fluminea)

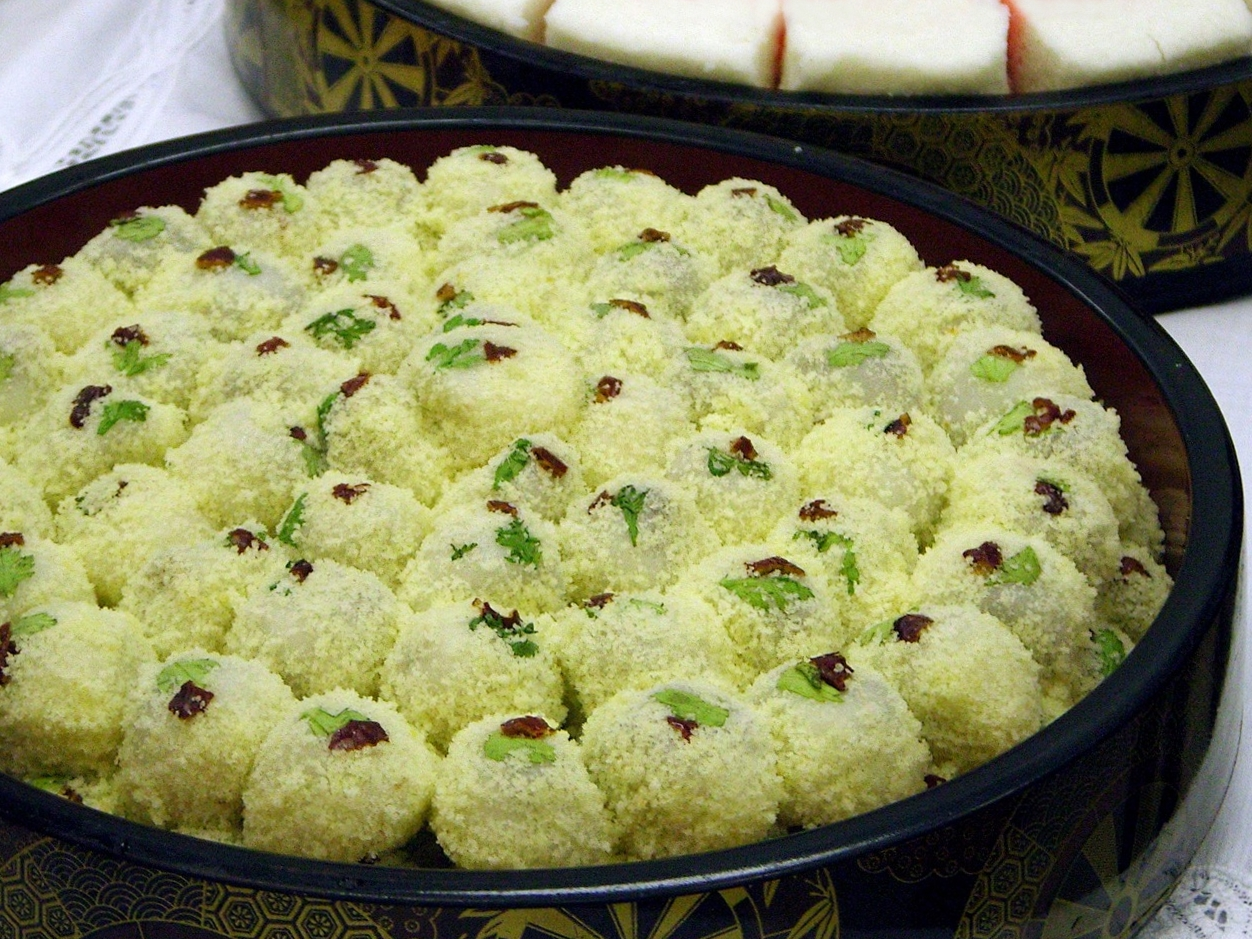
Bupyeon

=== Jeju Island ===
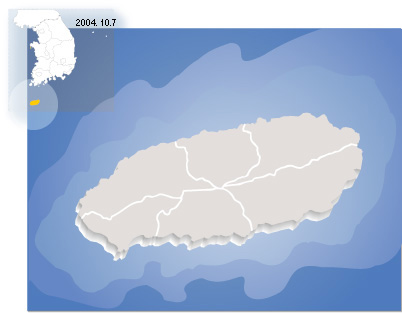
Map of Jeju Island

Jeju Island is the southernmost and largest island isolated from the Korean Peninsula. Due to its lack of fresh water, paddy farming is only done on a small scale on the island. The cultivation of cereal crops such as millet, barnyard millet, buckwheat, and barley is the main feature of the island's agriculture. As a result, the traditional Jeju meal generally consists of japgokbap, a bowl of steamed multiple grains as a main dish, with salted dried fish called jaban as banchan (side dishes), and a soup based on doenjang (soybean paste) such as baechuguk made with napa cabbage, kongnipguk made with soybean leaves, or muguk made with radish. Jeju dishes are made with simple ingredients, and the taste is generally salty. Raw seafood called hoe is commonly consumed as a part of the meal. The warm weather affects Jeju's cuisine in that gimjang, preparing kimchi in late autumn for winter consumption, is not necessary there unlike in the other provinces. Only a small amount of kimchi is pickled by Jeju's locals. Representative main dishes in Jeju cuisine are porridge made with fish, seafood, seaweeds, or mushrooms. Examples include jeonbokjuk made with abalone, okdomjuk made with red tilefish, gejuk made with crabs, gingijuk made with small crabs called bangge (Helice tridens), maeyeoksae juk made with young wakame, and chogijuk made with shiitake.

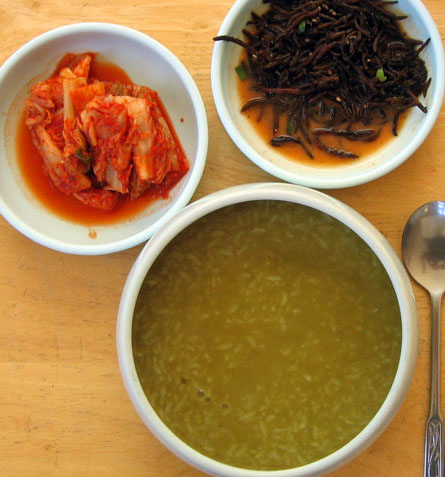
Jeonbokjuk, abalone porridge

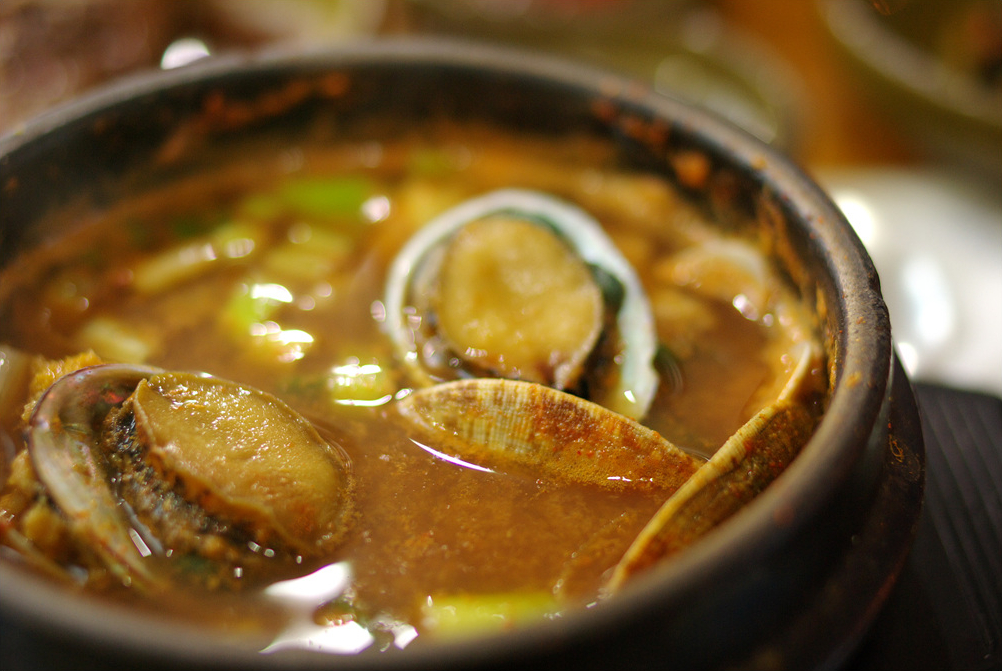
Obunjagi ttukbaegi, a stew made with colored abalone (Haliotis diversicolor) in a ttukbaegi pot

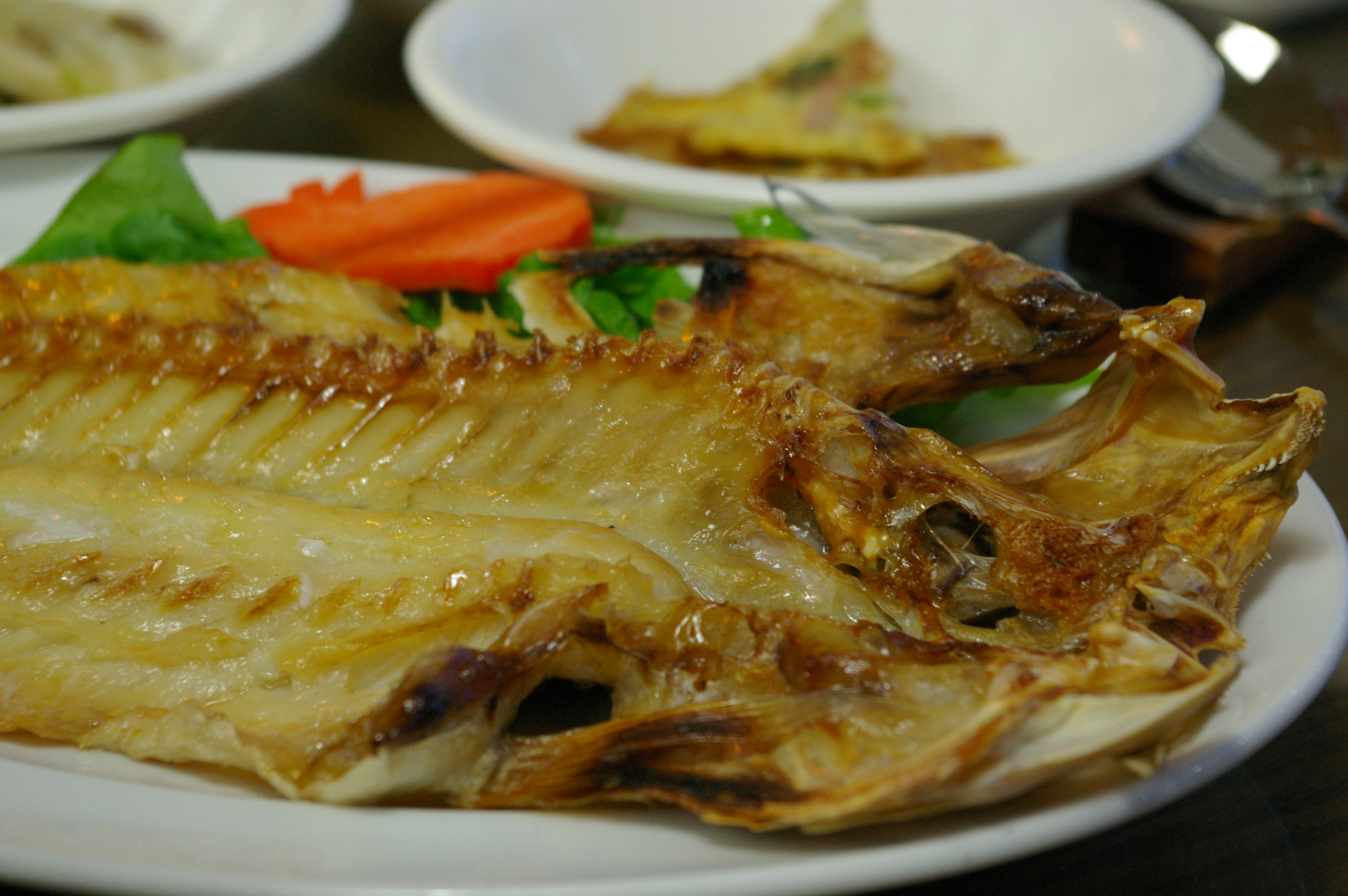
Okdom gui, grilled tilefish

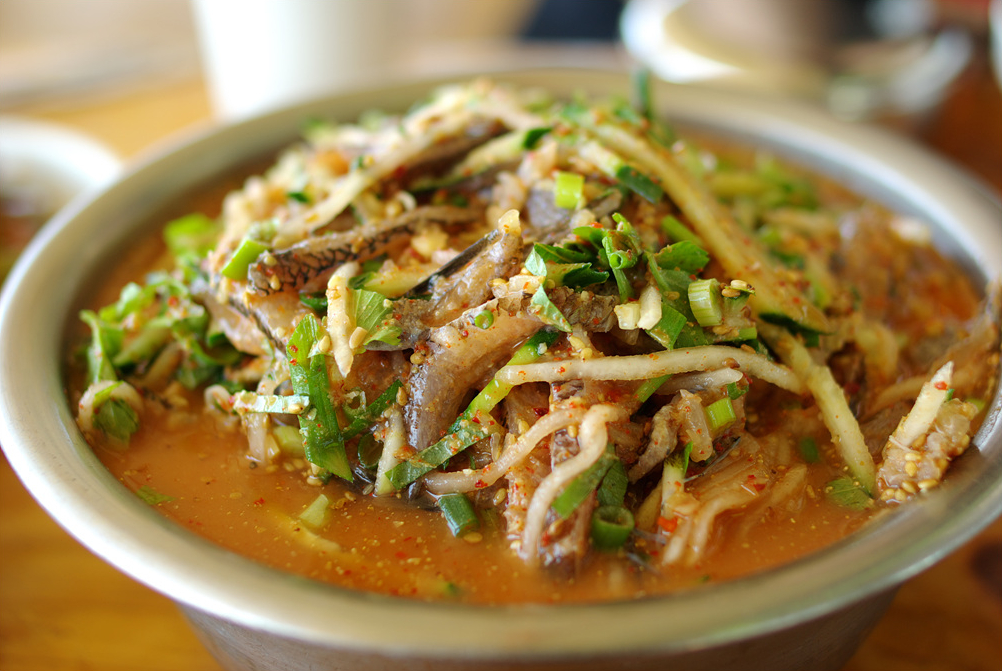
Jari mulhoe, mulhoe (sliced raw fish with a mixture of water and spice sauce), made with damselfish (Chromis notata).

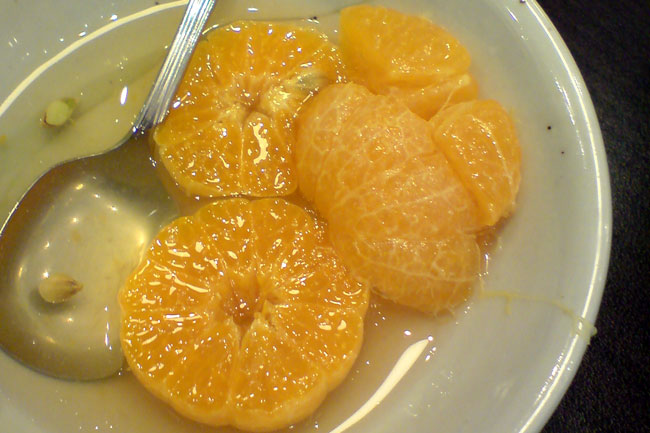
Milgam hwachae, mandarin orange punch.

== See also ==
- Korean cuisine
- Korean royal court cuisine
- Korean temple cuisine
- Koryo-saram cuisine
- List of Korean dishes
- List of North Korean dishes
