= List of restaurant chains in Poland =

This is a list of notable restaurant chains in Poland. A restaurant chain is a set of related restaurants with the same name in many different locations that are either under shared corporate ownership (e.g., McDonald's in the U.S.) or franchising agreements. Typically, the restaurants within a chain are built to a standard format through architectural prototype development and offer a standard menu and/or services.

== Major restaurant chains in Poland ==
Restaurant chain	Type	Founded / came to Poland	Owned by	Number of stores	Background / Notes
Bon Apetito	Casual dining	2009		10	Polish, Greek and Italian cuisine. Mediterranean cuisine centered around seafood.
Ha Long	Casual dining	2002		17	One of the biggest restaurants with Asian cuisine in France
Da Grasso	Casual dining	1996	Da Grasso Group	200	Italian cuisine, dominated by pizza dishes. The first Da Grasso pizzeria opened in the nineteen-ninetines, in Łódź. In the second quartile of 2010, the pizzeria chain numbered over 200 restaurants in around 150 towns and cities around Poland, becoming the largest pizzeria chain in the country.
Etno Cafè	Coffeehouse	2014		17	Specialist in Ethiopian and Brazilian coffee. Coffee shops offer other non-alcoholic beverages and snacks (i.e. delicatessen sandwiches and gateaus).
Fabricca	Casual dining	2000	Sfinks Polska	12	Polish and Italian cuisine: season dishes, various varieties of pizza, soup, delicatessen rogal and spaghetti dishes.
Pizza Hut	Casual dining	1992	Yum! Brands	150	The company is known for its Italian-American cuisine menu including pizza and pasta, as well as side dishes and desserts. The first Pizza Hut to open in Poland was in 1992, in the Marriott Hotel located in Wrocław. Thusly, the Polish branch of Pizza Hut holds its headquarters in Wrocław.
MaxiPizza	Casual dining	2002	MaxiPizza S.A.	13	One of the biggest pizza restaurants in Poland, first opened in Kielce in 2002.
Chłopskie Jadło	Casual dining	1995	Sfinks Polska	10	Polish folk cuisine, inter alia: regional dishes, soup, poultry and pork meat dishes.
Hard Rock Cafe	Casual dining	2007		4	
Sphinx	Casual dining	1995	Sfinks Polska	100	Italian-American and Iranian cuisine, inter alia: numerous varieties of meze, soup, salads, couscous dishes, delicatessen hamburgers.
Sushi 77	Casual dining	2006	Premium Food Restaurants	10	Japanese cuisine, dominated by sushi dishes.
Telepizza (Now T-Pizza)	Fast food	1992	Telepizza	123	Italian-American cuisine, dominated by pizza dishes.
A. Blikle	Coffeehouse	1869		23	Coffeehouse chain specialising in ice cream, coffee, chocolates, gateaus, pączki, tarts and pastries. The A. Blikle coffeehouse chain operates in six major cities in Poland: Warsaw, Łódź, Poznań, Katowice, Gdynia, Częstochowa, Gdańsk, Kutno.
Coffeeshop Company	Coffeehouse	2004	Schärf Group	4	Specialist in Espresso coffee from highland Arabica coffee beans. Apart from coffee, the coffeehouse also offers tea and snacks. Currently, the coffeehouse chain is located in three cities: Warsaw, Olsztyn and Rzeszów. All joints are found in shopping malls.
Cukiernia Sowa	Coffeehouse	1946		150	Specialist in coffee. Apart from a vast variety of coffee, the pâtisseries' menu consists of inter alia: tea, chocolates, juices and non-alcoholic fruit cocktails.
Green Caffè Nero	Coffeehouse	1997		56	Coffeehouse, dominated by coffee and tea. Apart from its beverages, the coffee shops offer pastries and panini sandwiches.
Carte d'Or	Coffeehouse	2010	Unilever	57	Ice cream desserts, waffles, gateaus, fruit cocktails.
Max Hamburgers	Fast food	2017		26	Swedish hamburger chain, opened in Poland in 2017
Costa Coffee	Coffeehouse	1999	Whitbread	110	Coffee, hot chocolate, snacks, biscuits and chocolates.
E. Wedel	Coffeehouse	1851	Lotte	27	Chocolates, pralines, hot chocolate, coffee, tea, wine and ice cream desserts.
Frankie's	Coffeehouse	2012		10	The menu consists of Juices, delicatessen sandwiches, salads, coffee and tea.
Grycan	Coffeehouse	1980		130	Specialist in chocolates and ice cream, offering its customers an abundant menu consisting of ice cream desserts in a palette of flavours, as well as fruit desserts, mousses, tea, juices, smoothies, ice cream and gateaus.
Krakowski Kredens	Coffeehouse	2007		10	Delicatessen specialising in chocolates, gateaus, sandwiches as well as coffee and wine beverages. Since 2019 there are less and less stores.
Second Cup	Coffeehouse	2016	Second Cup Coffee Co.	80	Canadian specialty coffee retailer. The menu consists of coffee, tea and smoothie beverages, as well as pastries and deli sandwiches.
So! Coffee	Coffeehouse	2014	Lagardère Group	64	Coffeehouse dominated by a variety of coffee.
Starbucks	Coffeehouse	2009	Starbucks Corporation	70	American coffee company and coffeehouse chain specialising in coffee, as well as offering its customers tea, juices, smoothies, deli sandwiches, gateaus, biscuits and yoghurts.
Tchibo	Coffeehouse	1992	Tchibo GmbH	50	German chain of coffee retailers and cafés known for its weekly-changing range of other products.
Vincent Boulangerie Patisserie	Coffeehouse	2008		12	Coffeehouse specialising in coffee beverages, gateaus, tarts, éclairs and macaroons.
Burger King	Fast food	1992	Restaurant Brands International	47	Fast food restaurant chain, dominated by hamburgers. Closed in 2001, reopened in 2007.
Conieco.	Fast food	1995	Kochlöffel	6	German fast-food restaurant chain. Its product range includes hamburgers, chicken, bratwurst, currywurst and french fries with their signature turquoise plastic fork resembling a cooking spoon. Closed in 2015.
Domino's Pizza	Fast food	2011	Domino's Pizza, Inc.	65	An American pizza restaurant chain.
Dunkin' Donuts	Fast food	1996, 2015	Dunkin' Brands	7	An American donut company and coffeehouse. Closed in late 2018.
KFC	Fast food	1993	AmRest	210	An American fast food restaurant chain that specializes in fried chicken.
McDonald's	Fast food	1992	McDonald's	441	An American hamburger and fast food restaurant chain.
Mr Hamburger	Fast food	1990	Mr Hamburger	15	A Polish fast food restaurant chain, specialising in hamburgers and zapiekanka dishes. Closed in 2022.
North Fish	Casual dining	1992	North Food	40	A casual dining restaurant chain specialising in fish and seafood dishes, bankrupt in 2025-2026
Pasibus	Fast food	2013		26	A Polish hamburger restaurant chain both in stationary and mobile form (i.e. Pasibus truck and garden).
Salad Story	Fast food	2007	Salad Story	32	Delicatessen sandwiches, salads and tortilla dishes.
Subway	Fast food	1992	Subway IP Inc.	135	An American fast food restaurant franchise that primarily sells submarine sandwiches (subs) and salads.
Zahir Kebab	Fast food	2014	Zahir & Zahid Sp. z o.o. sp. k.	115	A Polish kebab shop owned by a company based in Łódź. The first place was opened in 2014 in Ostrów Wielkopolski. Known mostly for doner kebab served in rolled tortilla or on the plate.
Berlin Döner Kebap	Fast food	1998	Berlin Doner Kebap Sp. z o.o.	63	A fast food restaurant chain specialising in Turkish cuisine, dominated by a variety of falafel and kebab dishes.
Thai Wok	Fast food	2016	Thai Wok Sp. z o.o.	23	A Polish fast food restaurant chain specialising in Thai cuisine.
Popeyes	Fast Food	2023	Restaurant Brands International	11	An American fast food restaurant chain that specializes in fried chicken.

== See also ==
- Lists of restaurants
- List of supermarket chains in Poland
