= Jindallae-hwachae =

Korean fruit punch variety

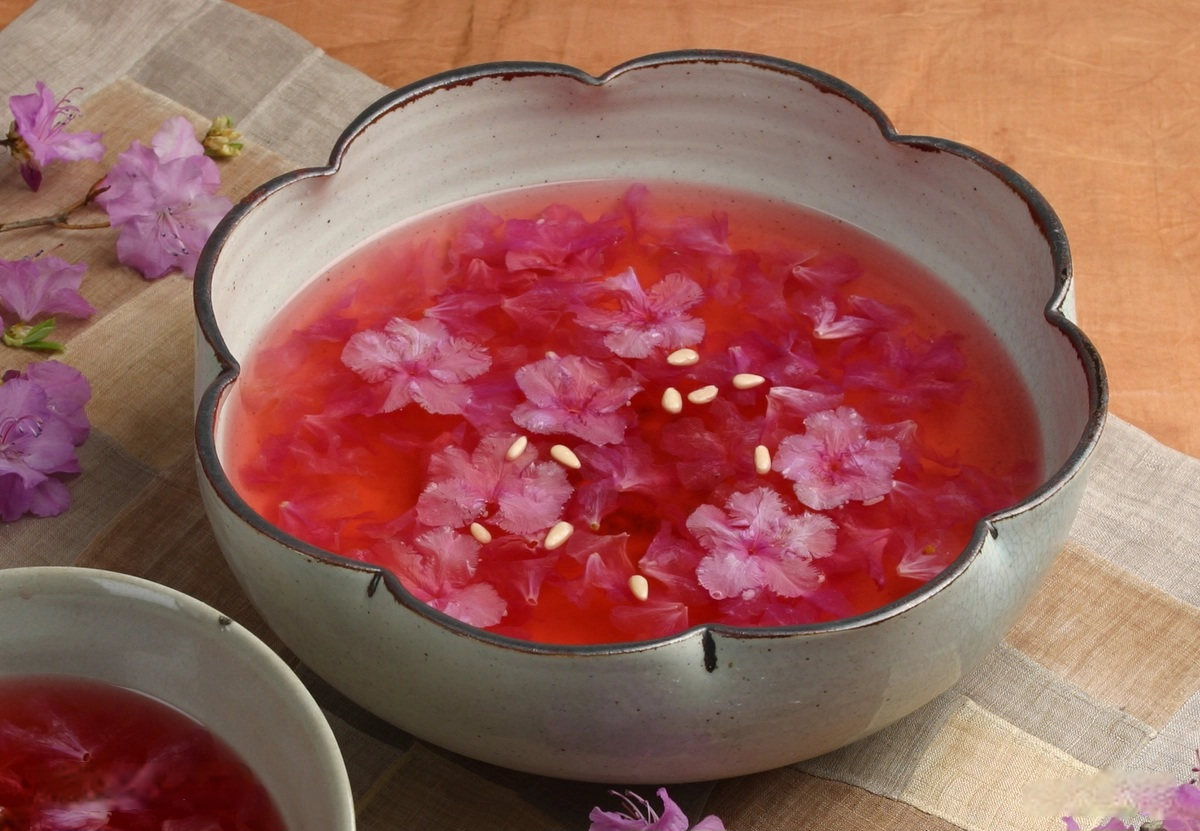
- Type: Hwachae
- Place of origin: Korea
- Associated cuisine: Korean cuisine
- Serving temperature: Cold

Korean name
- Hangul: 진달래화채
- Hanja: 진달래花菜
- RR: jindallaehwachae
- MR: chindallaehwach'ae
- IPA: [tɕin.dal.lɛ.ɦwa.tɕʰɛ]

Jindallae-hwachae (Korean: 진달래화채) is a variety of hwachae, or Korean traditional fruit punch, made with Korean rhododendron petals and mung bean starch. It is prepared for Samjinnal (삼짇날, a Korean traditional holiday which falls on the 3rd day of the 3rd month of the Korean calendar (lunisolar)).

== See also ==
- Hwajeon
- Hwachae
- List of Korean beverages
- Korean tea
