= Jeon (food) =

Korean pan-fried dish

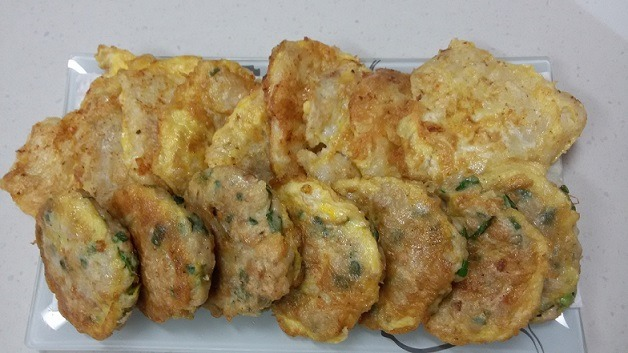
- Dongtae-jeon (pan-fried pollock) and donggeurang-ttaeng (pan-fried meatballs)
- Alternative names: Jeonya, jeonyu, jeonyueo, jeonyuhwa
- Type: Fritter
- Course: Appetizer, banchan, anju
- Place of origin: Korea
- Main ingredients: Fish, meat, poultry, seafood, vegetable, flour, egg

Korean name
- Hangul: 전
- Hanja: 煎
- RR: jeon
- MR: chŏn
- IPA: [tɕʌn]

Jeon (Korean: 전) is a fritter in Korean cuisine made by seasoning whole, sliced, or minced fish, meat, vegetables, and other ingredients, and coating them with wheat flour and egg wash before frying them in oil. Jeon can be served as an appetizer, a banchan (side dish), or an anju (food served and eaten with drinks). Some jeons are sweet desserts; one such variety is called hwajeon (literally "flower jeon").

== Names ==
Although jeon can be considered a type of buchimgae in a wider sense, buchimgae and jeons are different dishes. Jeons are smaller and made with fewer ingredients than buchimgae.

Jeon can also be called jeonya (저냐), especially in Korean royal court cuisine context. Jeonya is sometimes called jeonyueo (전유어) or jeonyuhwa (전유화).

The variety of jeon made for jesa (ancestral rite) are called gannap (간납). Gannap are usually made of beef liver, omasum, or fish.

== Types ==
Almost all jeons are seasoned, coated with wheat flour and egg wash, and then pan-fried.

=== Meat ===
Jeon made of red meat and poultry were used extensively in Korean royal court cuisine, while the food for ordinary folks tends to have some vegetable added to them. Yukjeon (육전, "meat jeon") is a generic term for a variety of jeon made of meat.

- Deunggol-jeon (등골전) – made of beef spinal cord.
- Donggeurang-ttaeng (동그랑땡) – little patties made of beef, pork, or fish with crumbled tofu, chopped scallions and namuls. Called don-jeonya (돈저냐, "coin jeonya") in Korean royal court cuisine.

==== Korean royal court cuisine ====
- Chamsae-jeonya (참새저냐) – made of sparrow meat.
- Cheonyeop-jeonya (처녑저냐) – made of beef omasum.
- Daechang-jeonya (대창저냐) – made of boiled beef intestine.
- Dak-jeonya (닭저냐) – made of chicken.
- Gan-jeonya (간저냐) – made of beef or pork liver.
- Gogi-jeonya (고기저냐) – made of thinly sliced or finely minced beef.
- Gol-jeonya (골저냐) – made of boiled and sliced beef brain or beef spinal cord.
- Jeyuk-jeonya (제육저냐) – made of thinly sliced lean pork.
- Mechuri-jeonya (메추리저냐) – made of thinly sliced quail meat.
- Nogyuk-jeonya (녹육저냐) – made of thinly sliced venison.
- Saengchi-jeonya (생치저냐) – made of pheasant meat.
- Satae-jeonya (사태저냐) – made of boiled and thinly sliced beef shank.
- Seonji-jeonya (선지저냐) – made of blanched and seasoned seonji (blood).
- Soeseo-jeonya (쇠서저냐) – made of thinly sliced beef tongue.
- Yang-jeonya (양저냐) – made of thinly sliced beef tripe.
- Yangyuk-jeonya (양육저냐) – made of thinly sliced lamb.

=== Seafood ===
Saengseon-jeon (생선전, "fish jeon") is a generic term for any jeon made of fish. White fish are usually preferred. Haemul-jeon (해물전, "seafood jeon") includes the jeon made of fish as well as shellfish, shrimps, and octopuses.

- Daeha-jeon (대하전) – made of fleshy prawn.
- Guljeon (굴전) – made of oysters. Called gul-jeonya (굴저냐) in Korean royal court cuisine.
- Haesam-jeon (해삼전) – made of dried and soaked sea cucumbers, usually with ground beef and crumbled tofu attached on them. Also called mwissam (뮈쌈).
- Saeu-jeon (새우전) – made of peeled shrimp. Called saeu-jeonya (새우저냐) in Korean royal court cuisine.
- Daegu-jeon (대구전) - made of codfish.

==== Korean royal court cuisine ====
- Baendaengi-jeonya (밴댕이저냐) – made of a whole sardinella.
- Baengeo-jeonya (뱅어저냐) – made of multiple halved whitebaits
- Bajirak-jeonya (바지락저냐) – made of Manila clam.
- Bangeo-jeonya (방어저냐) – made of salted and thinly sliced yellowtail
- Biut-jeonya (비웃저냐) – made of herring.
- Bok-jeonya (복저냐) – made of pufferfish.
- Bugeo-jeonya (북어저냐) – made of dried pollock.
- Bungeo-jeonya (붕어저냐) – made of thinly sliced carp.
- Bure-jeonya (부레저냐) – made by stuffing the swim bladder of a croaker with croaker flesh and ground beef, then sealing and boiling it, and slicing it before coating it with wheat flour and egg wash and pan-frying it.
- Daegu-jeonya (대구저냐) – made of thinly sliced cod.
- Domi-jeonya (도미저냐) – made of thinly sliced sea bream.
- Gajami-jeonya (가자미저냐) – made of flatfish flesh crushed with wheat flour and chopped scallions.
- Garimat-jeonya (가리맛저냐) – made of razor clam.
- Ge-jeonya (게저냐) – made of a whole crab.
- Godeungeo-jeonya (고등어저냐) – made of thinly sliced chub mackerel.
- Iri-jeonya (이리저냐) – made of salted milt.
- Jogae-jeonya (조개저냐) – made of shellfish.
- Junchi-jeonya (준치저냐) – made of elongate ilisha.
- Mikkuri-jeonya (미꾸리저냐) – made of salted pond loach.
- Mineo-jeonya (민어저냐) – made of thinly sliced croaker.
- Myeolchi-jeonya (멸치저냐) – made of salted anchovy.
- Nakji-jeonya (낙지저냐) – made of skinned and thinly sliced long-arm octopus.
- Neopchi-jeonya (넙치저냐) – made of thinly sliced olive flounder.
- Samchi-jeonya (삼치저냐) – made of thinly sliced and salted seerfish.
- Ssogari-jeonya (쏘가리저냐) – made of golden mandarin fish.
- Sungeo-jeonya (숭어저냐) – made of thinly sliced mullet.
- Yeoneo-jeonya (연어저냐) – made of thinly sliced salmon.

=== Vegetables and mushrooms ===
Chaeso-jeon (채소전, "vegetable jeon") is a generic term for any jeon made of vegetables.

- Gamja-jeon (감자전) – made of shredded potato. Also can be made of grated, squeezed potato with potato starch and vegetables added to it.
- Pajeon (파전) – made of scallions. Dongnae-pajeon is usually made of whole scallions. Seafood is added in haemul-pajeon (literally "seafood pajeon").
- Deodeok-jeon (더덕전), made of lance asiabell.
- Dubu-jeon (두부전) – made of sliced tofu. Called dubu-jeonya (두부저냐) in Korean royal court cuisine.
- Gaji-jeon (가지전) – made of thinly sliced eggplant.
- Gamnip-jeon (감잎전) – made from persimmon leaf
- Gochu-jeon (고추전) – made of deseeded green chili pepper, filled with ground meat and crumbled tofu.
- Gosari-jeon (고사리전), made with bracken.
- Gugyeop-jeon (국엽전) – made of leaves of chrysanths.
- Hobak-jeon (호박전), made of thinly sliced Korean zucchini
- Mukjeon (묵전) – made of thinly sliced and dried muk of three different colours. Called muk-jeonya (묵저냐) in Korean royal court cuisine.
- Pyogo-jeon (표고전), made of shiitake mushrooms and ground beef.
- Samsaekjeon (삼색전) – literally "three colour jeon". Made of mushrooms, green chili peppers, and onions.
- Ssukjeon (쑥전) – made of mugwort.
- Buchu-jeon (부추전) – made of garlic chives.

==== Korean royal court cuisine ====
- Baechu-jeonya (배추저냐) – made of the white part of napa cabbage or washed kimchi, with ground beef.
- Baekhap-jeonya (백합저냐) – made of sliced scaly bulbs of lily.
- Beoseot-jeonya (버섯저냐) – made of sliced mushrooms.
- Bibimbap-jeonya (비빔밥저냐) – made of a spoonful or two of bibimbap.
- Doraji-jeonya (도라지저냐) – made of soaked and shredded balloon flower roots.
- Gangnangkong-jeonya (강낭콩저냐) – made of unripe beans.
- Seogi-jeonya (석이저냐) – made of wide stone ear mushrooms.
- Songi-jeonya (송이저냐) – made of matsutake mushrooms.
- Yangpa-jeonya (양파저냐) – made of sliced onions.
- Yeongeun-jeonya (연근저냐) – made of grated and strained lotus root.

=== Flower ===
Hwajeon (화전, "flower jeon") is a generic term for any jeon made of edible flowers. Hwajeons are usually sweet, with honey as an ingredient. Jeon made of jujube is sometimes called hwajeon.

- Chijahwa-jeon (치자화전) – made of gardenia flowers.
- Gukhwa-jeon (국화전) – made of chrysanthemum flowers.
- Jangmi-hwajeon (장미화전) – made of roses.
- Jindallae-hwajeon (진달래화전) – made of rhododendron flowers. Jindallae-hwajeon is a special food item associated with Samjinnal.
- Okjamhwa-jeon (옥잠화전) – made of plantain lily buds.

== Gallery ==
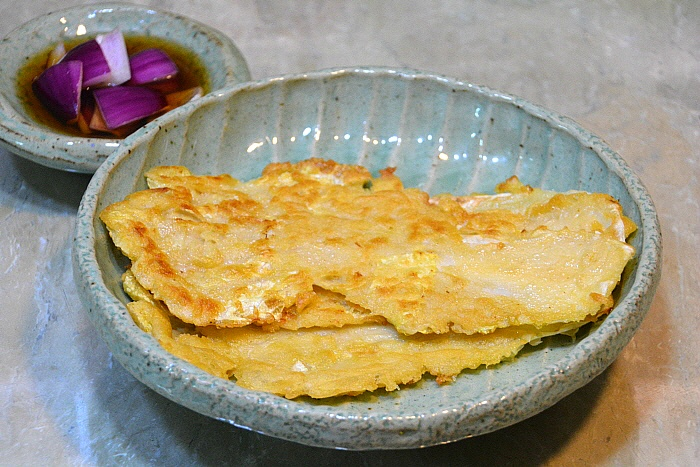
Baechu-jeon (pan-fried napa cabbage)

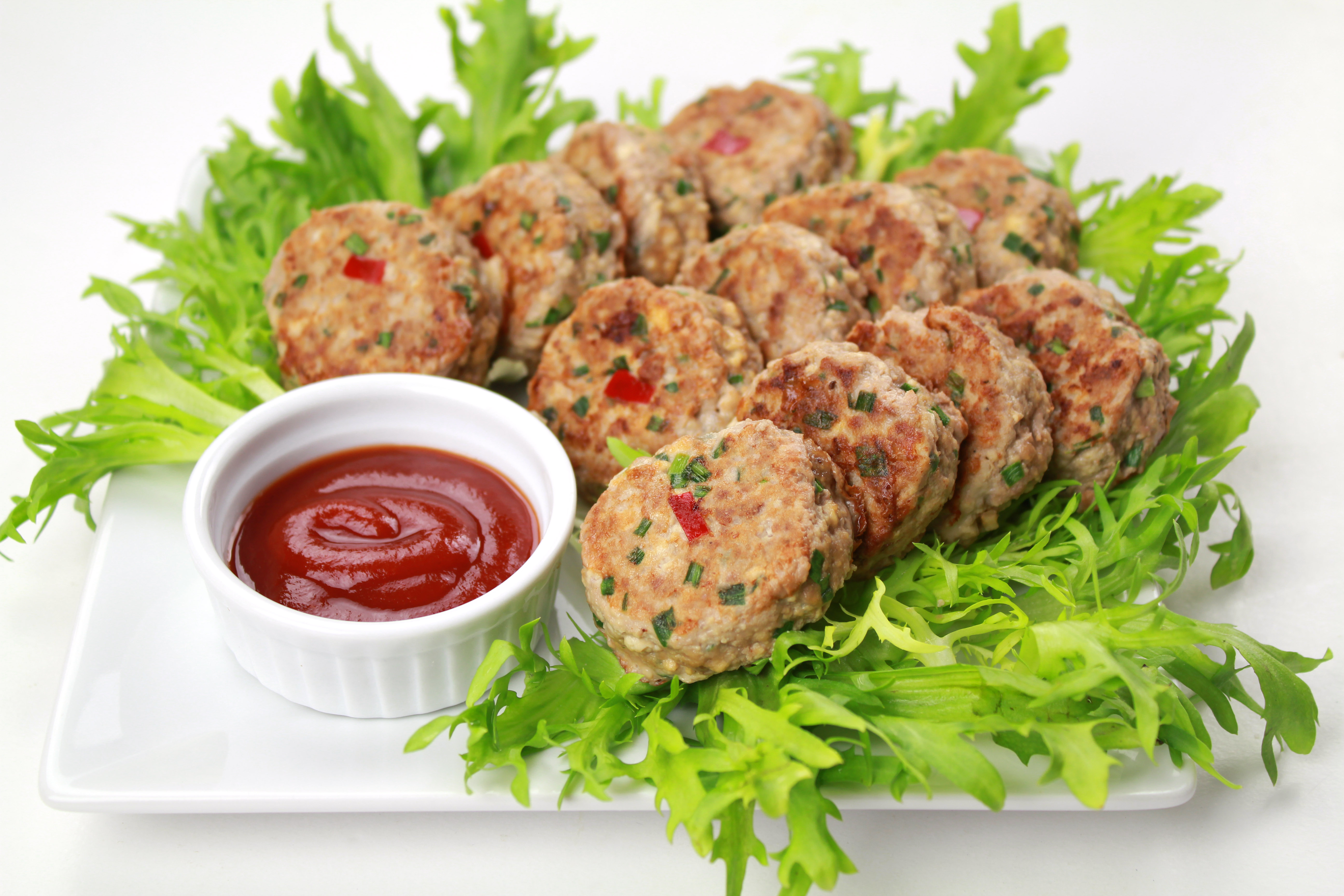
Donggeurang-ttaeng (pan-fried meatballs)

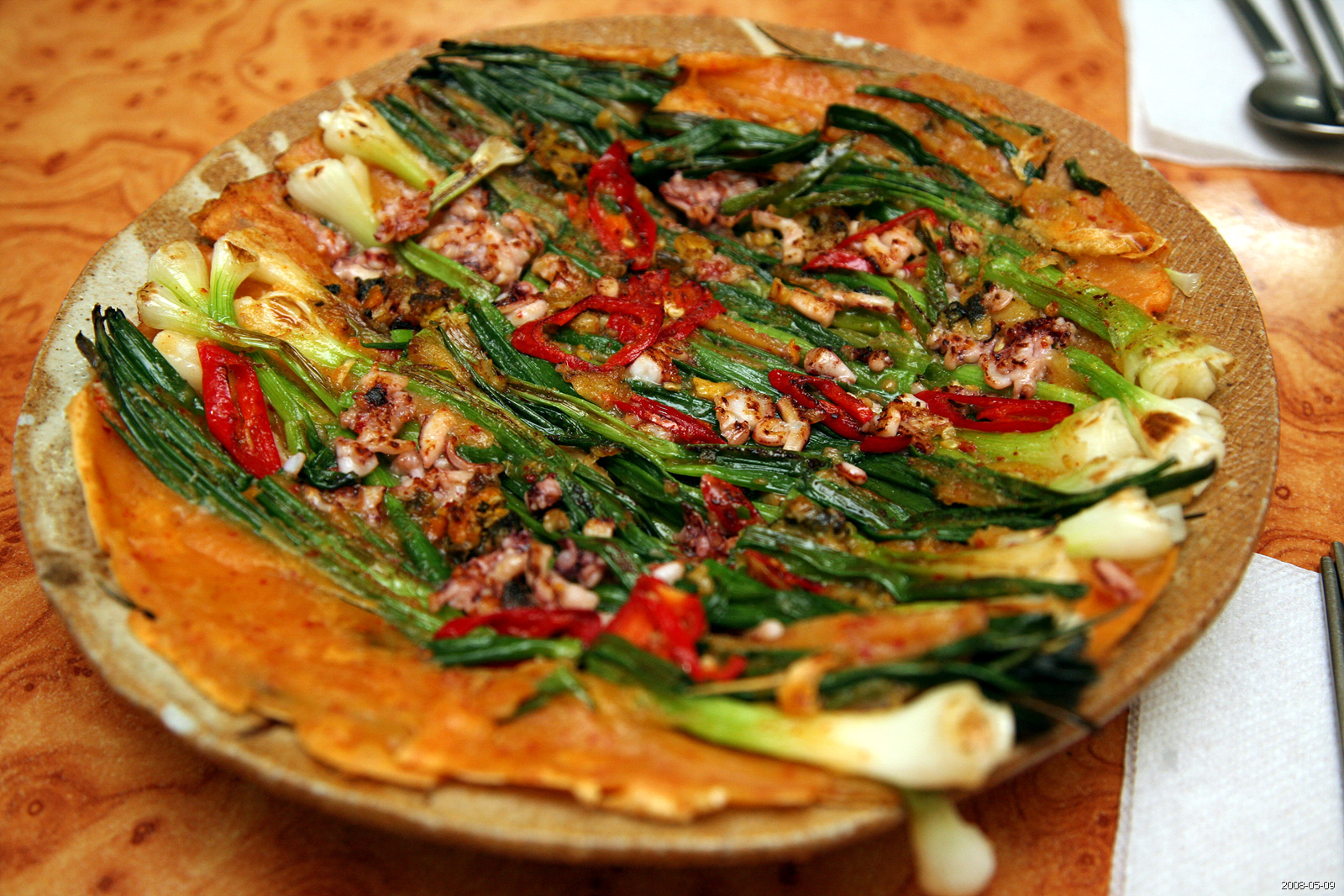
Dongnae-pajeon (scallion pancakes, of Dongnae District in Busan)

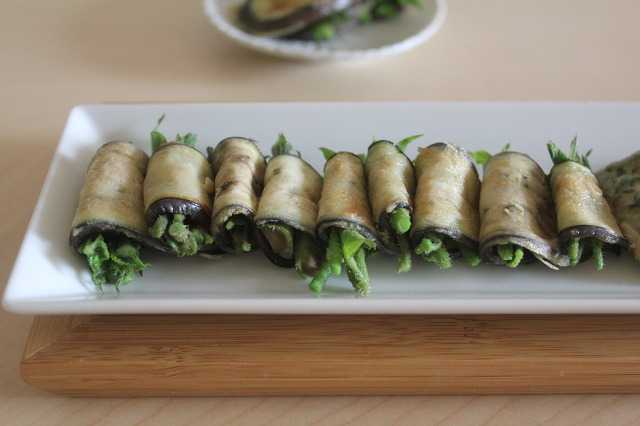
Dureup-gaji-jeon (pan-fried angelica-tree shoot)

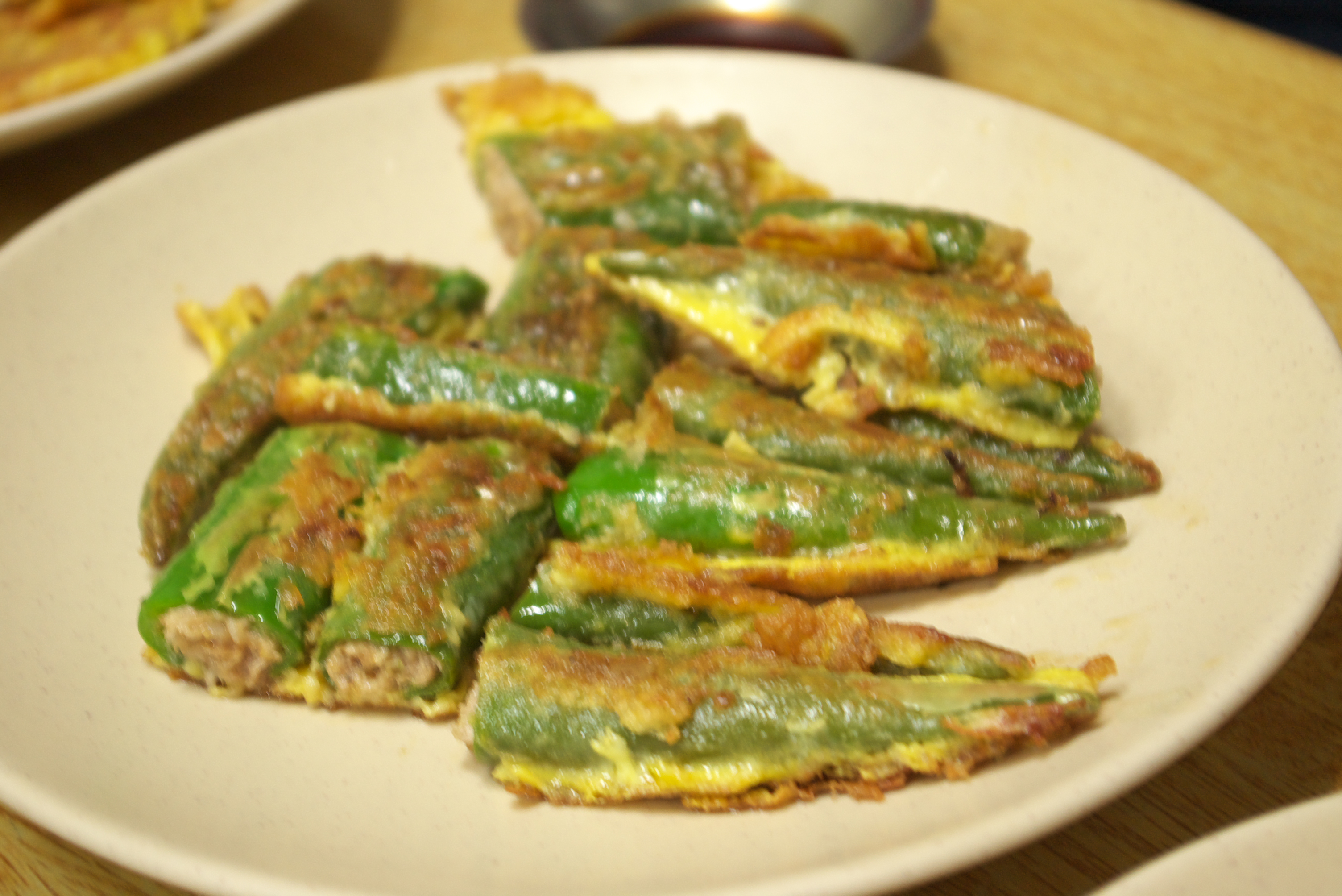
Gochu-jeon (pan-fried chili peppers)

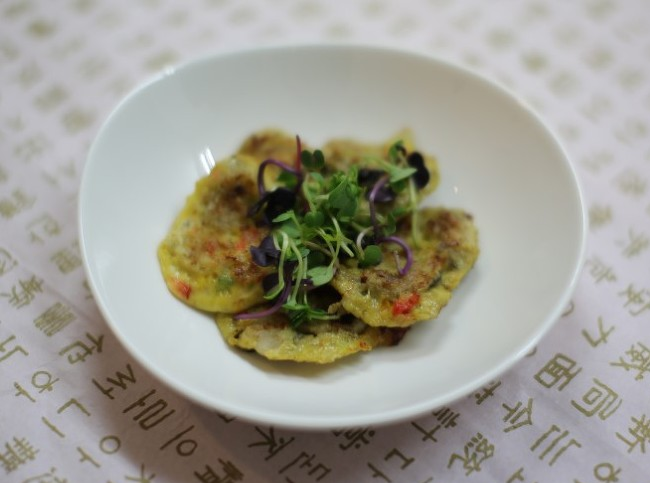
Guljeon (pan-fried oysters)

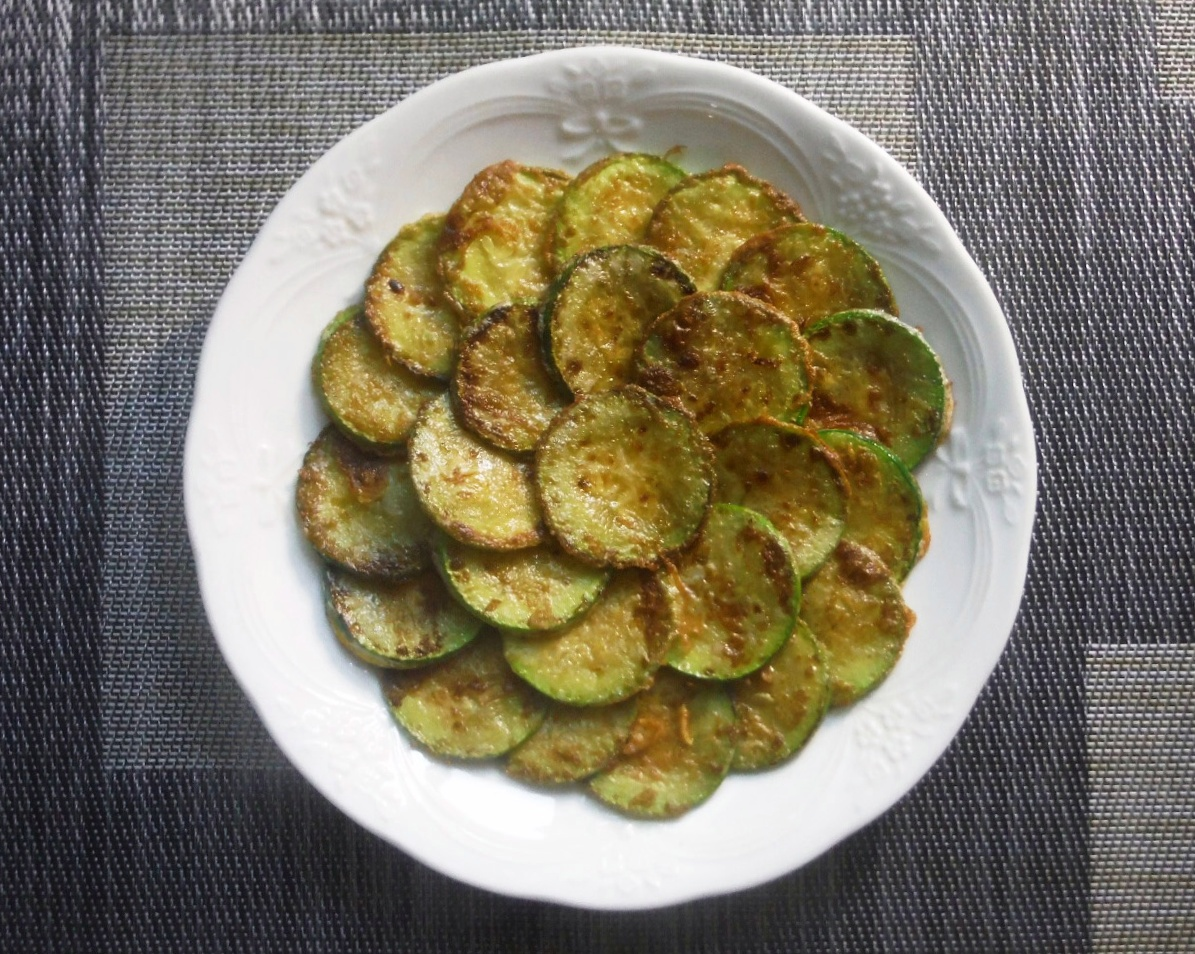
Hobak-jeon (pan-fried Korean zucchini)

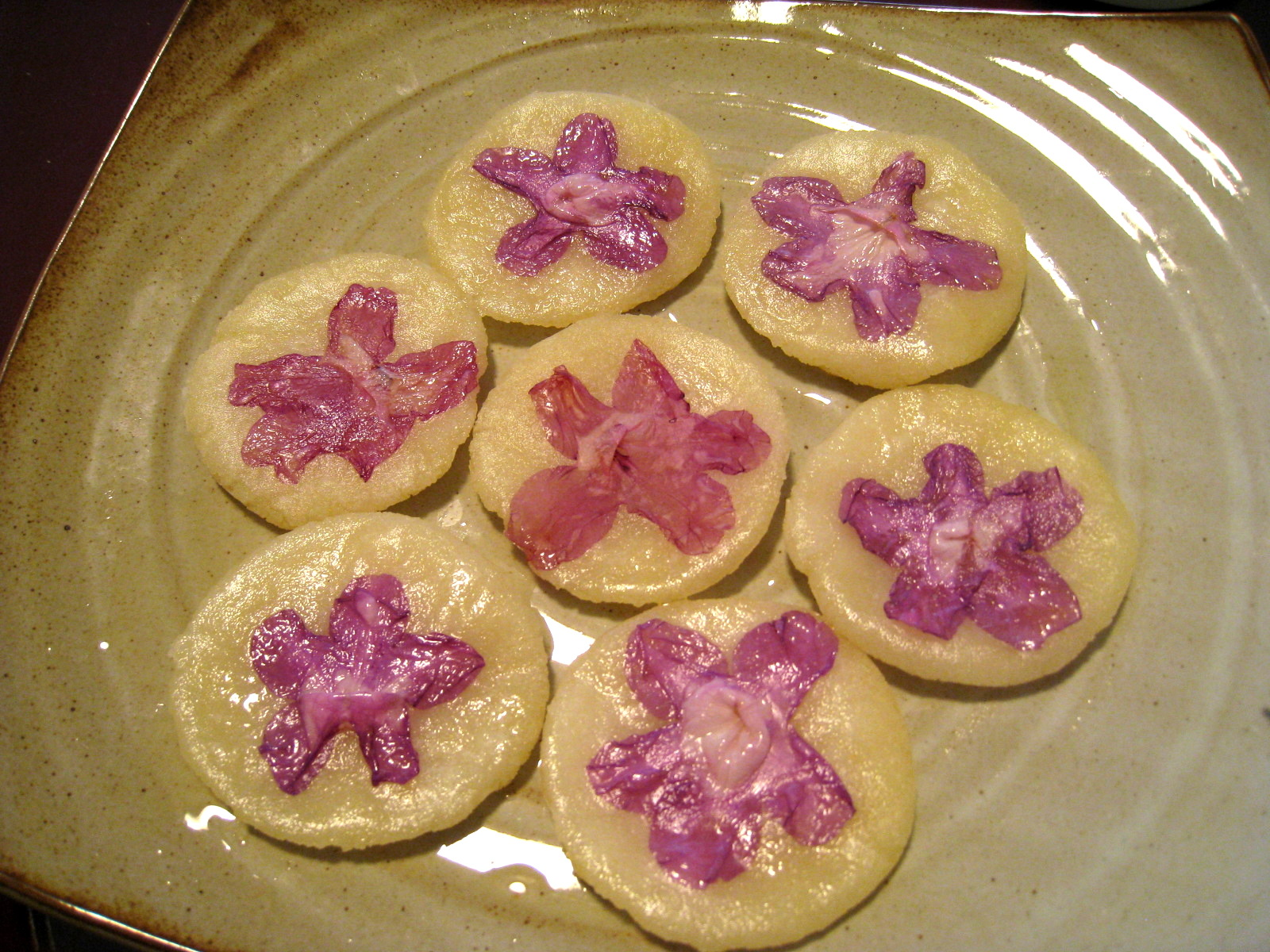
Hwajeon (flower pancakes)

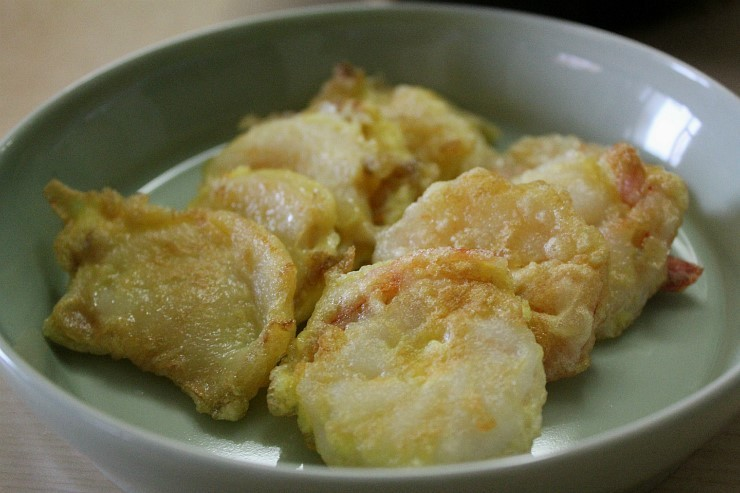
Jeonbok-jeon (pan-fried abalones)

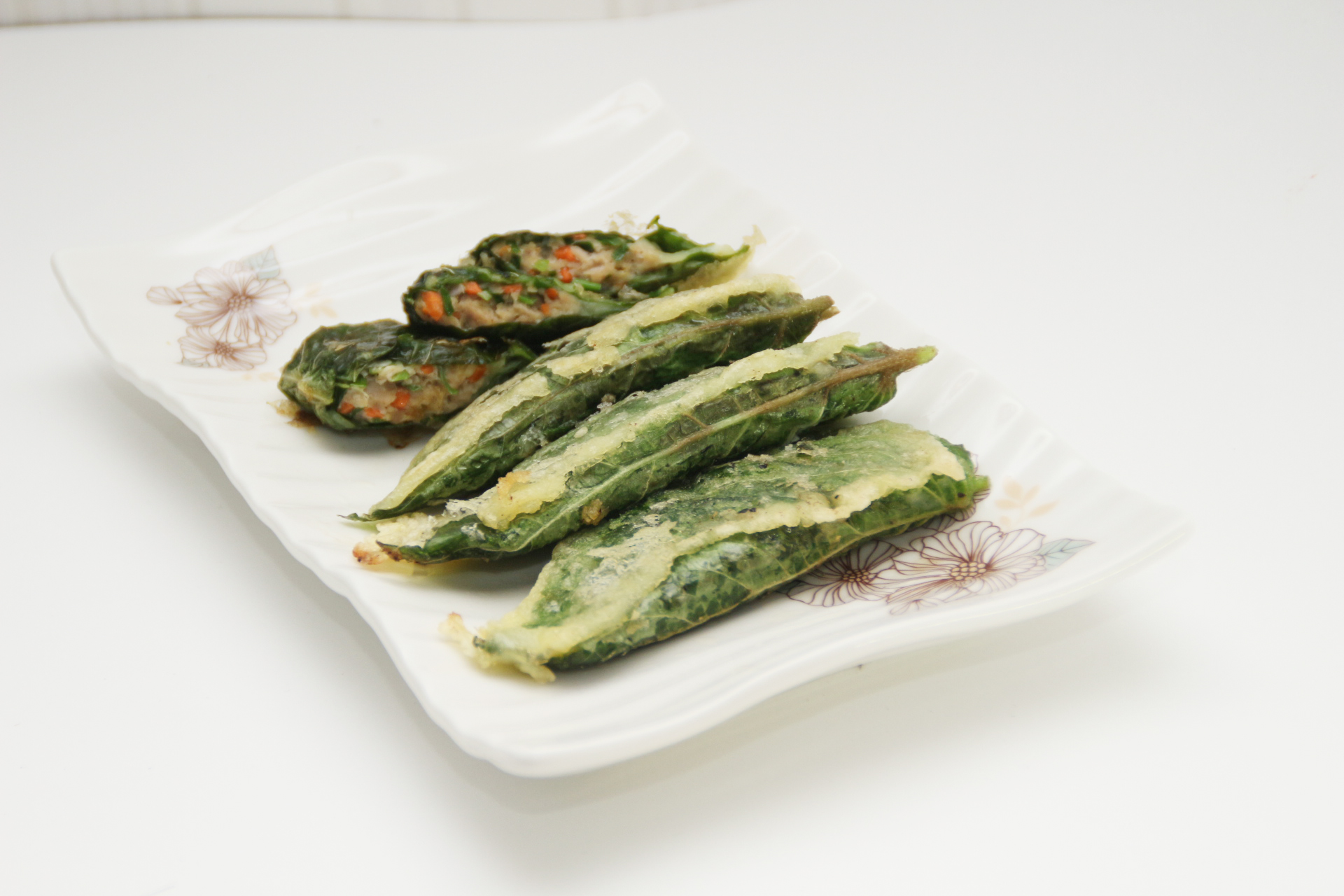
Kkaennip-jeon (pan-fried perilla leaves)

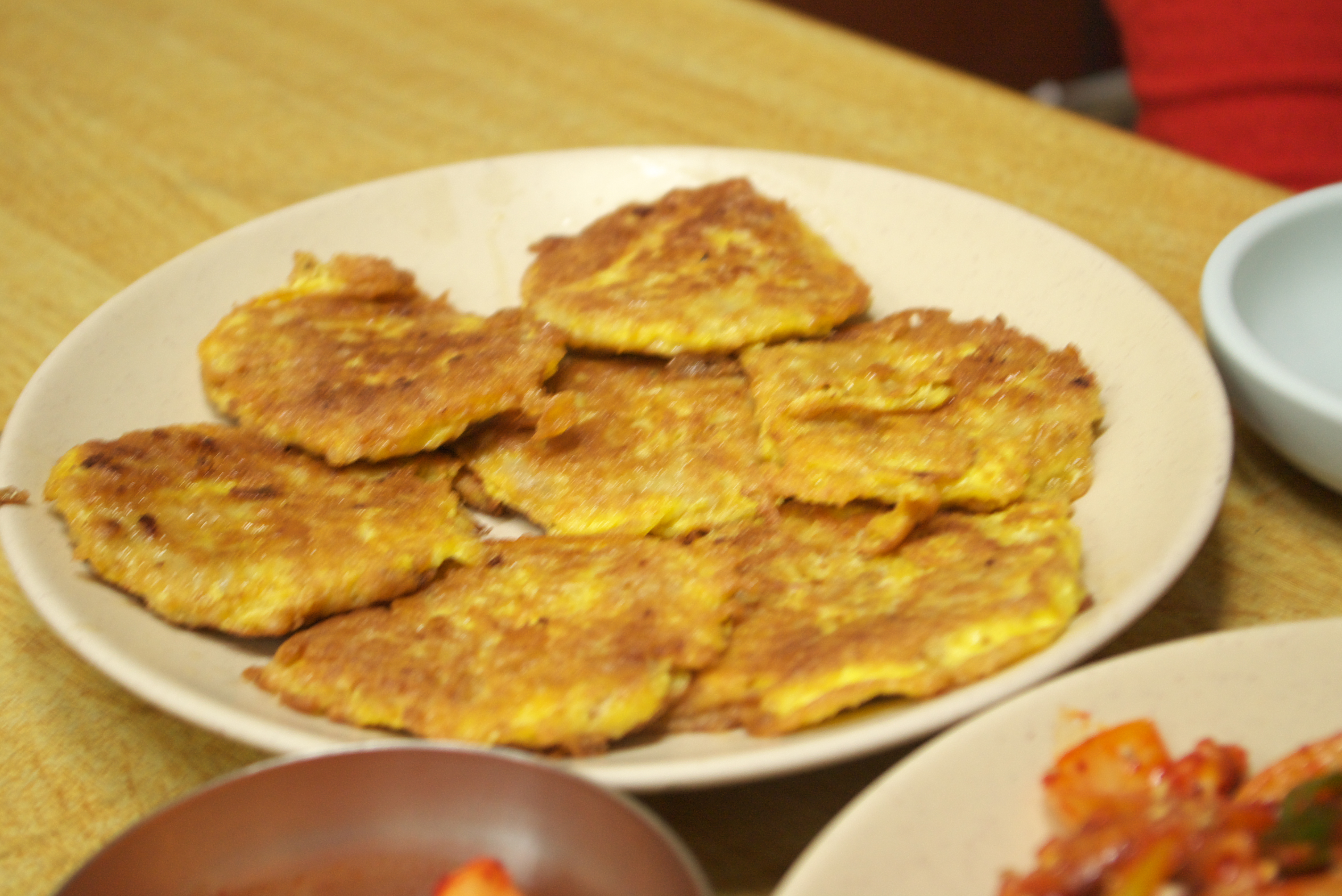
Saengseon-jeon (pan-fried fish)

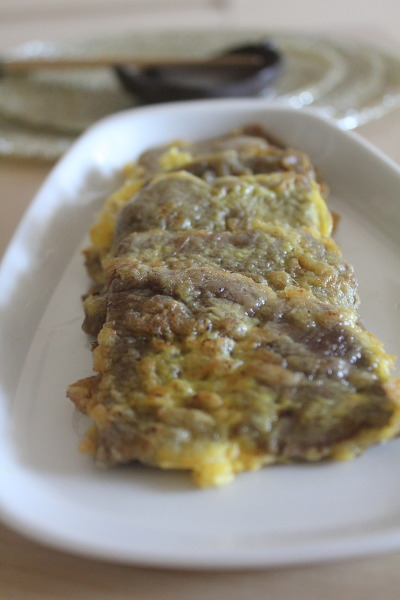
Yukjeon (literally 'meat jeon', although specifically referring to pan-fried beef slices)

== See also ==
- Bindaetteok – Korean fried mung bean pancake
- Buchimgae – Korean pan-fried dish
- Meat jun – Korean-Hawaiian fusion dish popular in Hawaii
