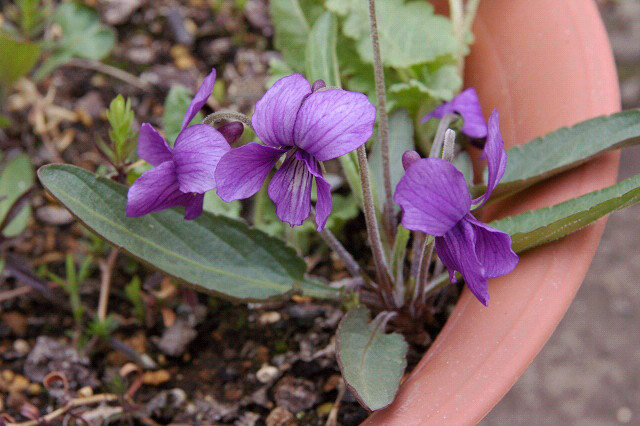

Scientific classification
- Kingdom: Plantae
- Clade: Tracheophytes
- Clade: Angiosperms
- Clade: Eudicots
- Clade: Rosids
- Order: Malpighiales
- Family: Violaceae
- Genus: Viola
- Species: V. mandshurica

Binomial name
- Viola mandshurica Wilhelm Becker

= Viola mandshurica =

Species of flowering plant

Viola mandshurica is a perennial species of violet known by the common names dōng běi jǐn cài (zh:东北堇菜) meaning 'northeastern violet' in China, jebikkot (ko:제비꽃) meaning 'sparrow flower' in Korea, and sumire (ja:菫, ja:スミレ) meaning 'violet' in Japan. In Japan, V. mandshurica is considered to be the basic species and other violet species have additional descriptors such as himesumire or nojisumire. Its specific name is derived from Manchuria, an area of its native habitat which has at different times in history included parts of modern China, Korea, Mongolia and the Russian Far East.

== Distribution ==
It is native to eastern Asia, being found as far west as eastern Siberia, throughout China, Taiwan and Korea, north into Russian North Asia (particularly in and around the Ussuri River Basin), and in much of Japan, including Okinawa. Across its range, this species occurs in a variety of habitats, from undisturbed woodlands to urban areas, and from low-lying plains to mountainous regions. A number of varieties have been developed by horticulturalists and are popular as garden plants. The wild form, and most named varieties and hybrids, prefer a semi-shaded location and humus-enriched soil that is not overly moist.

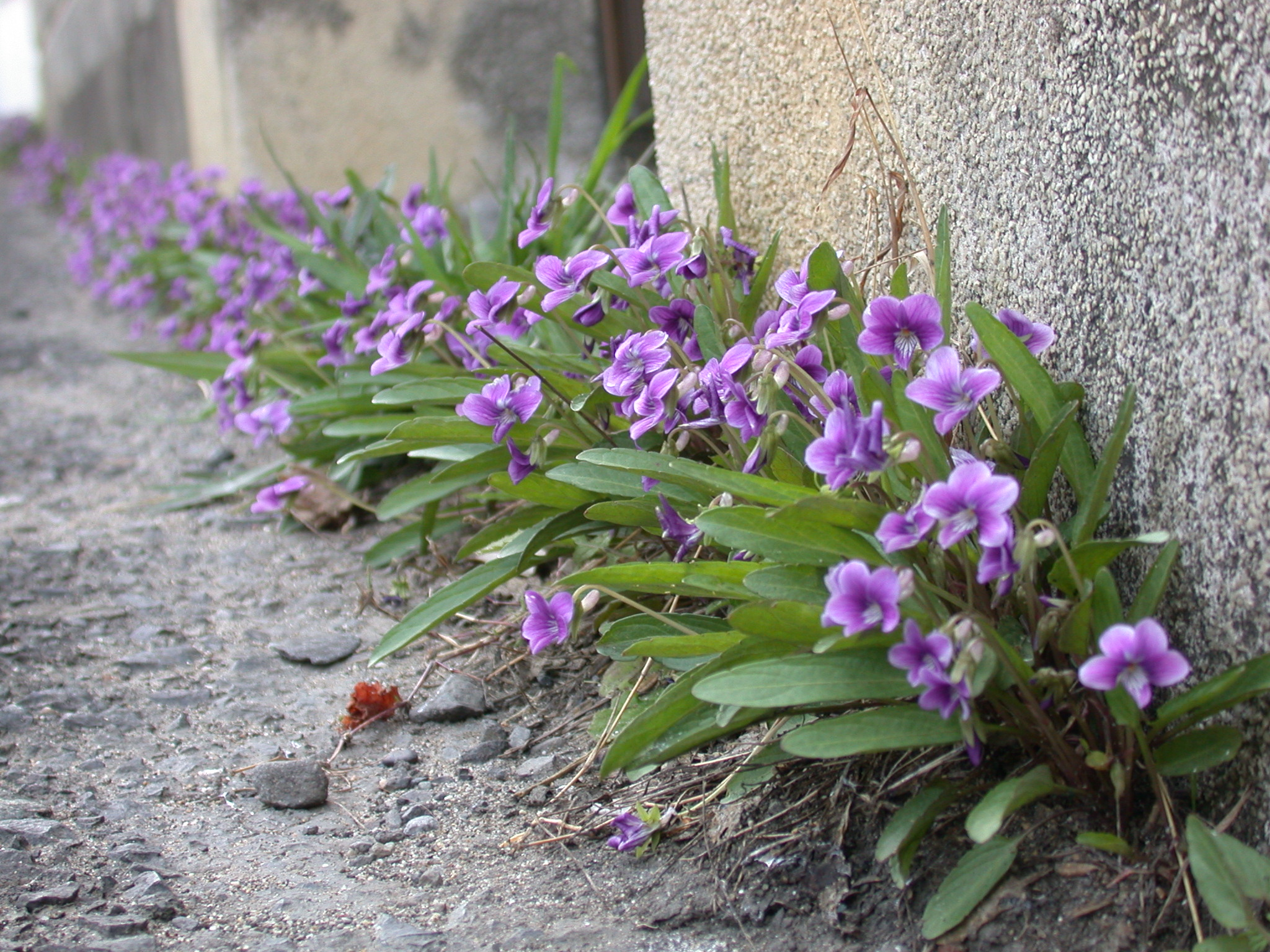
V. mandshurica along a roadside in Tanabe Wakayama, Japan

== Description ==
Viola mandshurica, like many other viola species, does not have a true stem, with leaves and flowers each emerging directly from the ground (actually from its underground rhizome), reaching a height of 6–18 centimeters (2–7 in). Its rhizomatous roots are short and thick. The leaves are typically oval-lanceolate to lanceolate, with both surfaces either glabrous or sparsely puberulous; while the color of the leaves is normally a medium green above and below, some cultivars, such as Fuji Dawn, have leaves variegated with white, yellow and/or pink spots, streaks or splotches.

As a violet, its trumpet-shaped flowers have five petals and bilateral symmetry. The lowermost petal is often the smallest, and all petals are typically a rich purple hue, though this can vary due to local conditions or localized mutations, and in some varieties deliberately bred for differing appearance. It blooms from April to May and the fruiting period is from May to September.

== Culinary uses ==
Flower pancakes, which may be made with the flowers of V. mandshurica among other species, are an essential part of the Korean Samjinnal festival celebrating the coming of spring.

== Cultivars, varieties and formae ==
Named subgroups of v. mandshurica include:

- V. mandshurica f. albo-variegata (also known under the commercial name "Fuji Dawn") features variegated leaves, with pale markings against the normal green, sometimes suffused with a pink tinge; these markings fade as the leaves age, and are typically gone by midsummer, but it remains a popular plant for home gardeners.
- V. mandshurica var. crassa is frequently seen in coastal areas, even on sandy beaches inhospitable to most Viola species; the name crassa comes from the Latin crassus, meaning thick, and refers to its shiny, coriaceous leaves which may be a factor in its ability to thrive in sandy soil and in full sun.
- V. mandshurica f. plena has double flowers, i.e., ten petals per bloom instead of the usual five, and may be found in a variety of shades of purple.
- V. mandshurica var. triangularis is also well-adapted to beaches, and similarly to var. crassa can thrive in full sun. This variety's name refers to its leaves, in this case to their shape, which are more pointed than other varieties of V. mandshurica, coming to a point, but still significantly longer than they are wide; like those of var. crassa, the leaves are quite glossy.
