= Seasonal food =

Produce that is in season

Seasonal food refers to the times of the year when the harvest or the flavour of a given type of food is at its peak. This is usually the time when the item is harvested, with some exceptions; an example being sweet potatoes which are best eaten several weeks after harvest. Seasonal food reduces the greenhouse gas emissions resulting from food consumption and is integral in a low carbon diet. Macrobiotic diets emphasize eating locally grown foods that are in season.

== History ==
The seasonal food of Korea were formed against the backdrop of a natural environment where changes in farming life and four seasons were evident, and different depending on the failure, influenced by various geographical environments. In contrast, summer diet consisted of green beans radish, lettuces, chicories, aubergine, carrots, cucumber, gherkins, watercress, marrow, courgettes, and rice. The meat accompanied these vegetables consisted mainly of poultry, ostrich and beef products.[source needed] Fruity desserts included fruits such as lemon, lime quinces, nectarines, mulberry, cherries, plums, apricot, grapes, pomegranates, watermelon, pears, apple, and melon. Meanwhile, the drinks involved syrups and jams. Fruit pastels, lemon, rose, jasmine, ginger and fennel.

In autumn, meals included cabbage, cauliflower, carrots, celery, gourd, wheat, barley, millet, turnips, parsnips, onions, acorns, peanuts, pulses, and olive oil. Drinks incorporated aromatic herbs and flower distillations of essential oils.

In the digital age, apps and websites track in-season food.

== Climate impact ==
Use of food according to its seasonal availability can reduce the greenhouse gas emissions resulting from food consumption (food miles). According to a 2021 study backed by the United Nations, more than a third of global greenhouse gas emissions come from food production, processing, and packaging.

== Gallery of seasonal food ==
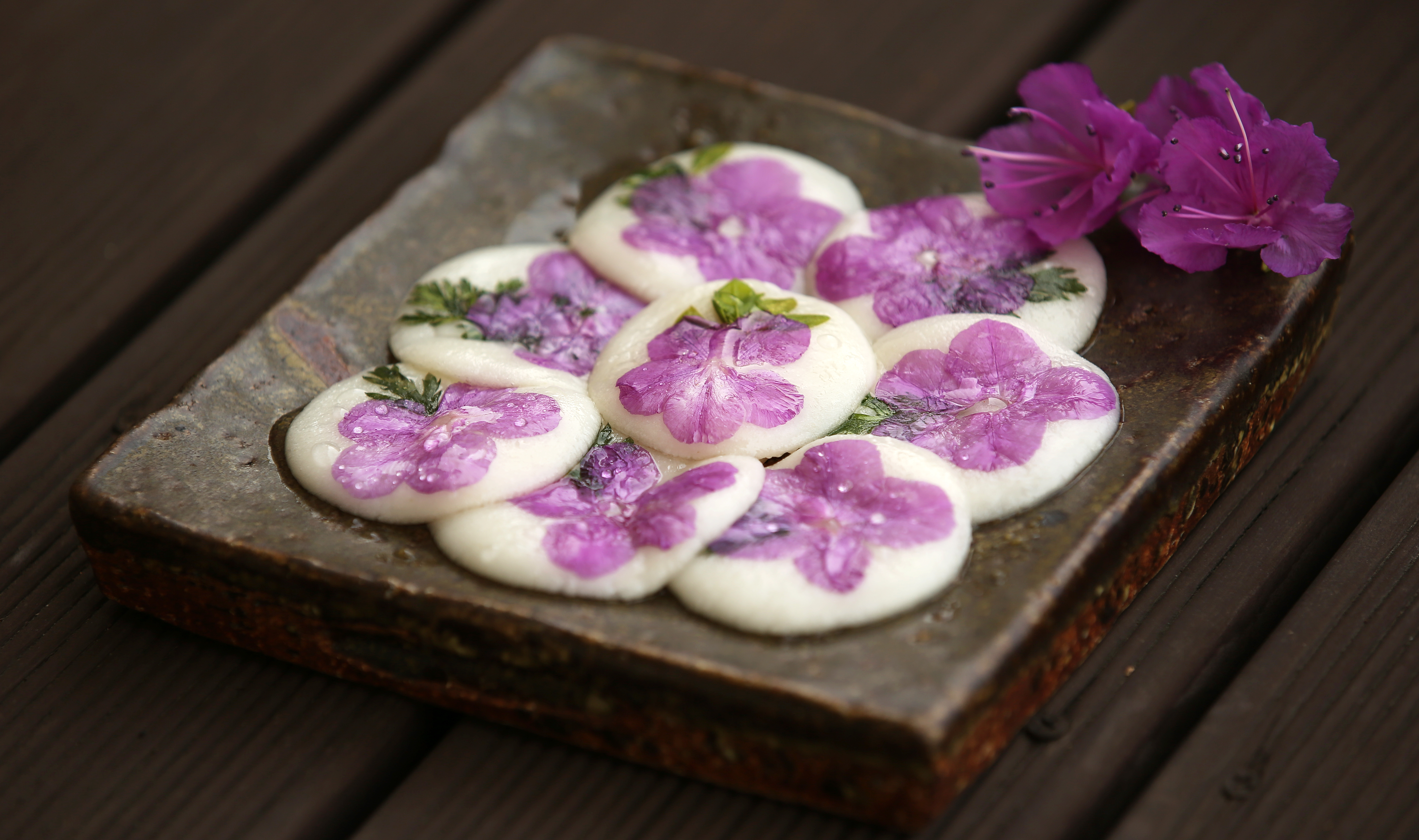
Hwajeon (flower cakes), made in spring using rhododendron petals

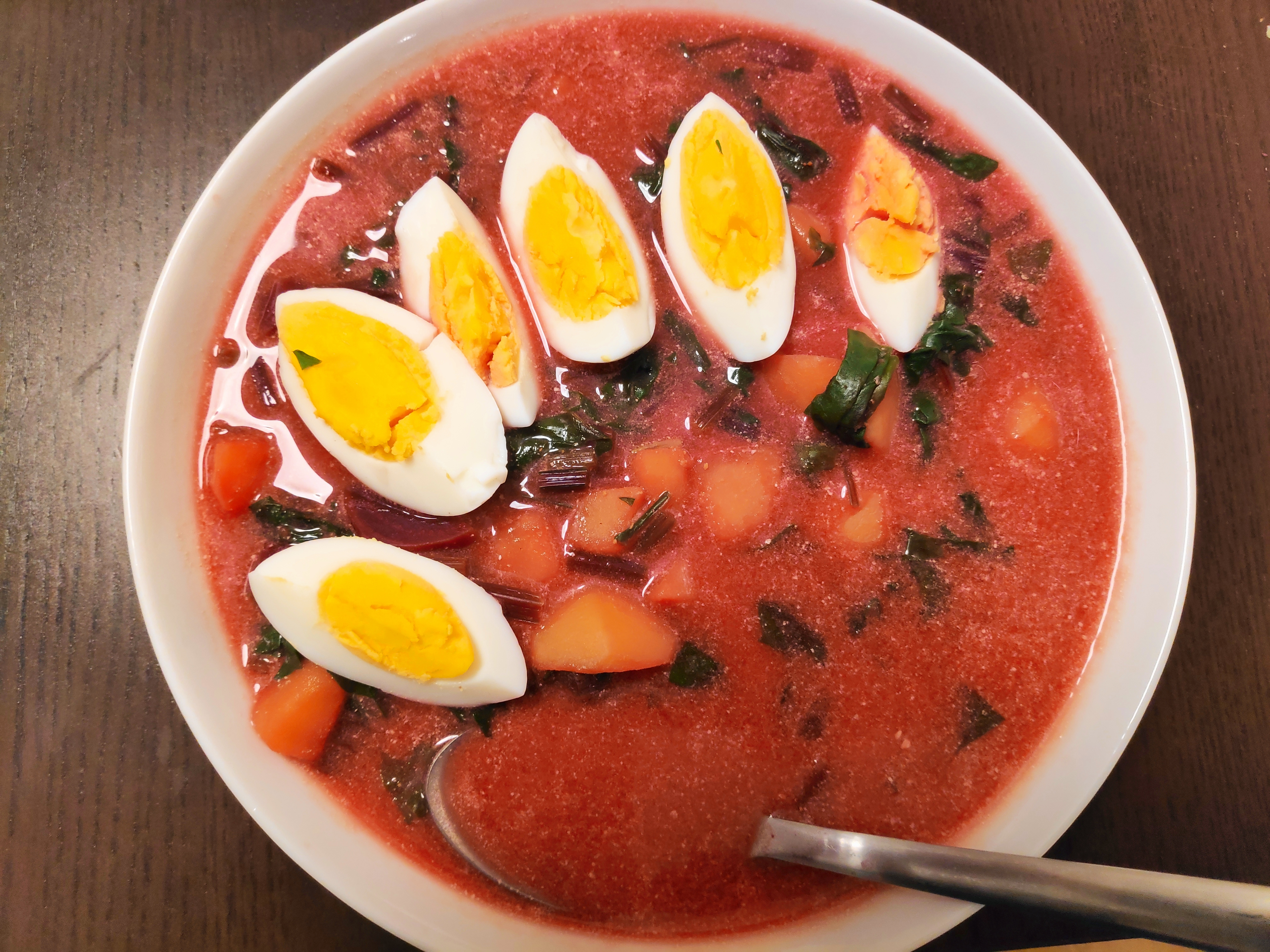
Botwinka, beet leaves soup typical for late spring in Polish cuisine

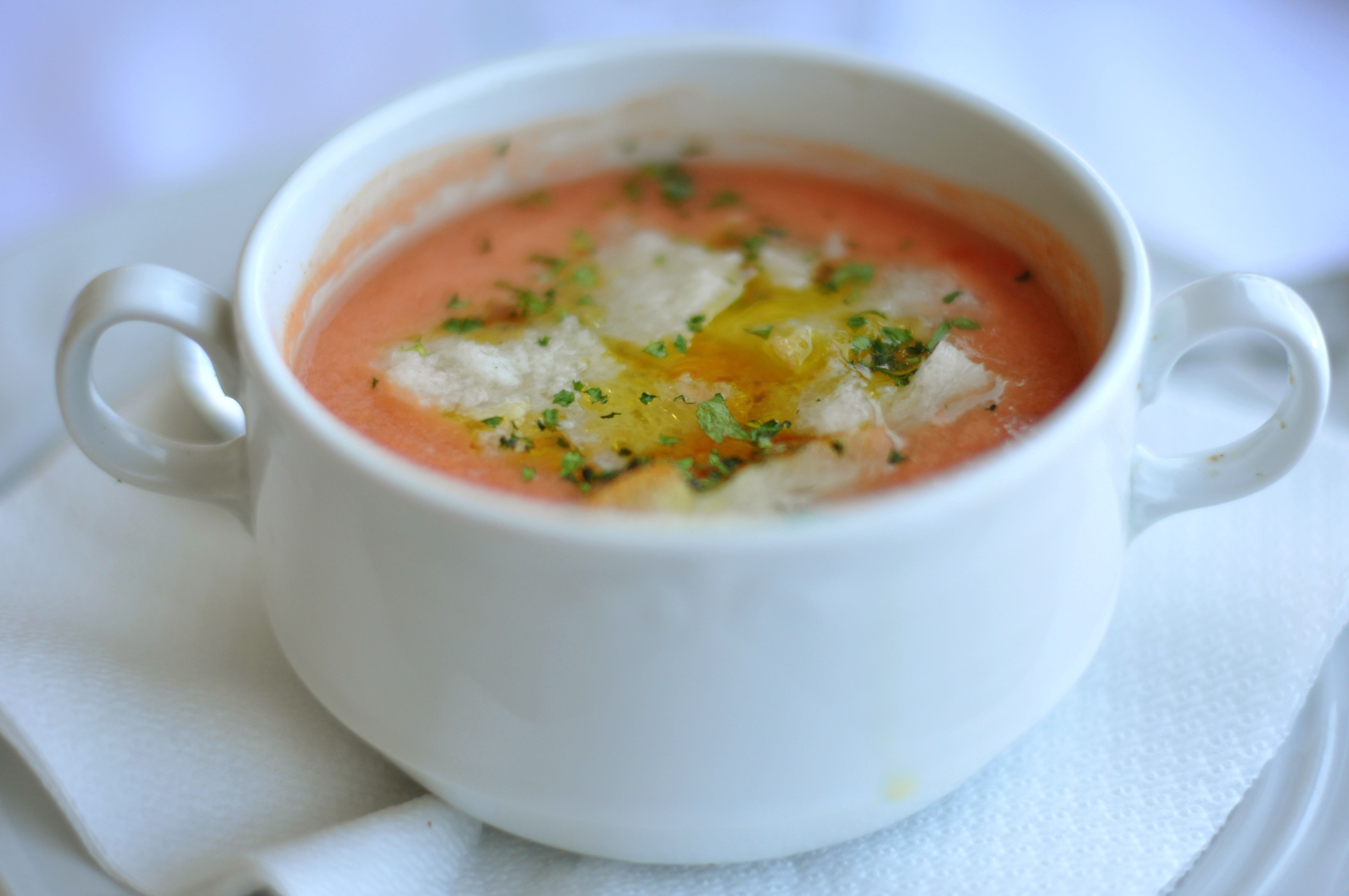
Gazpacho, a summer soup made of raw blended vegetables and served cold

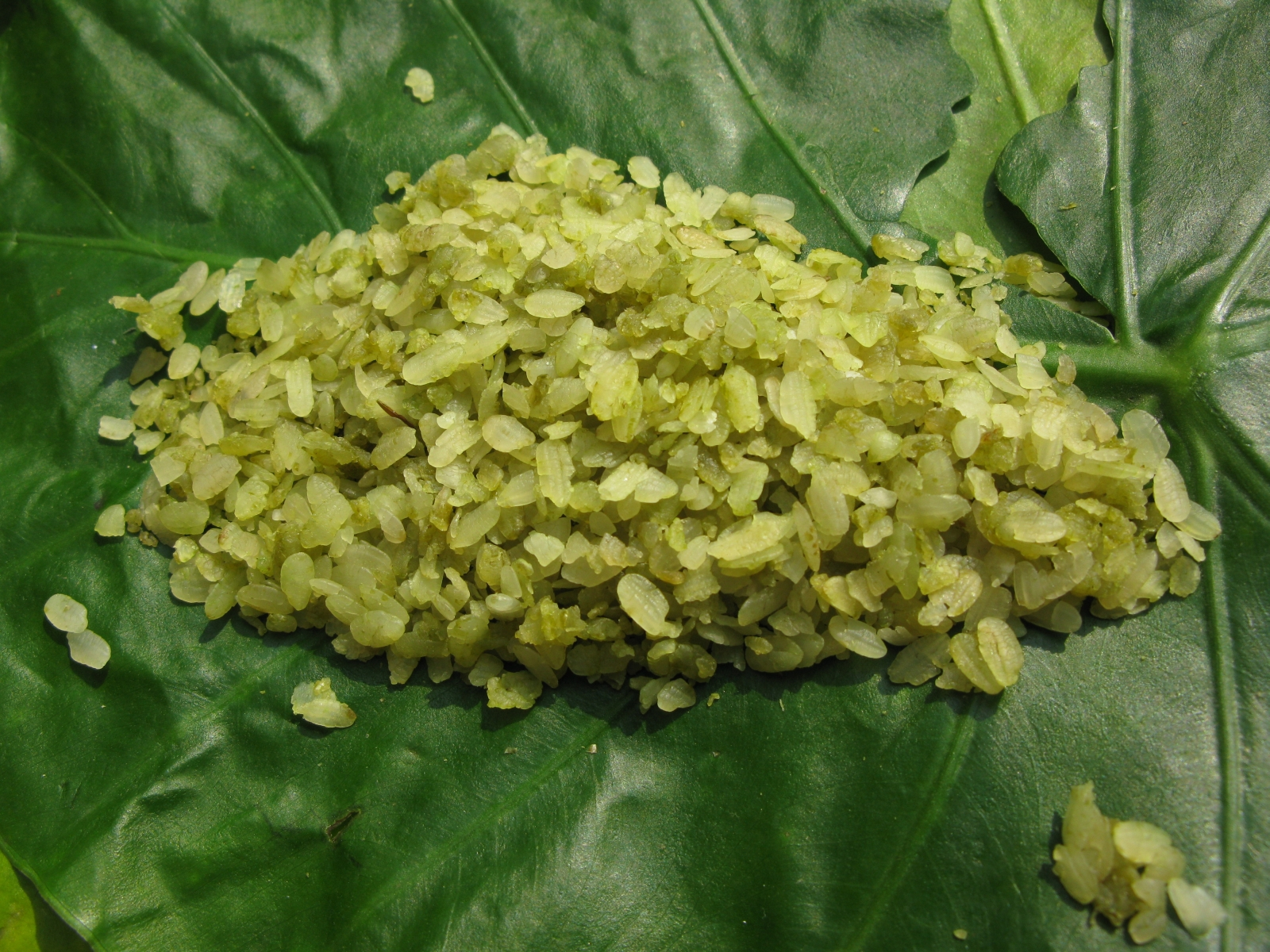
Cốm (green rice), a dish traditionally associated with autumn

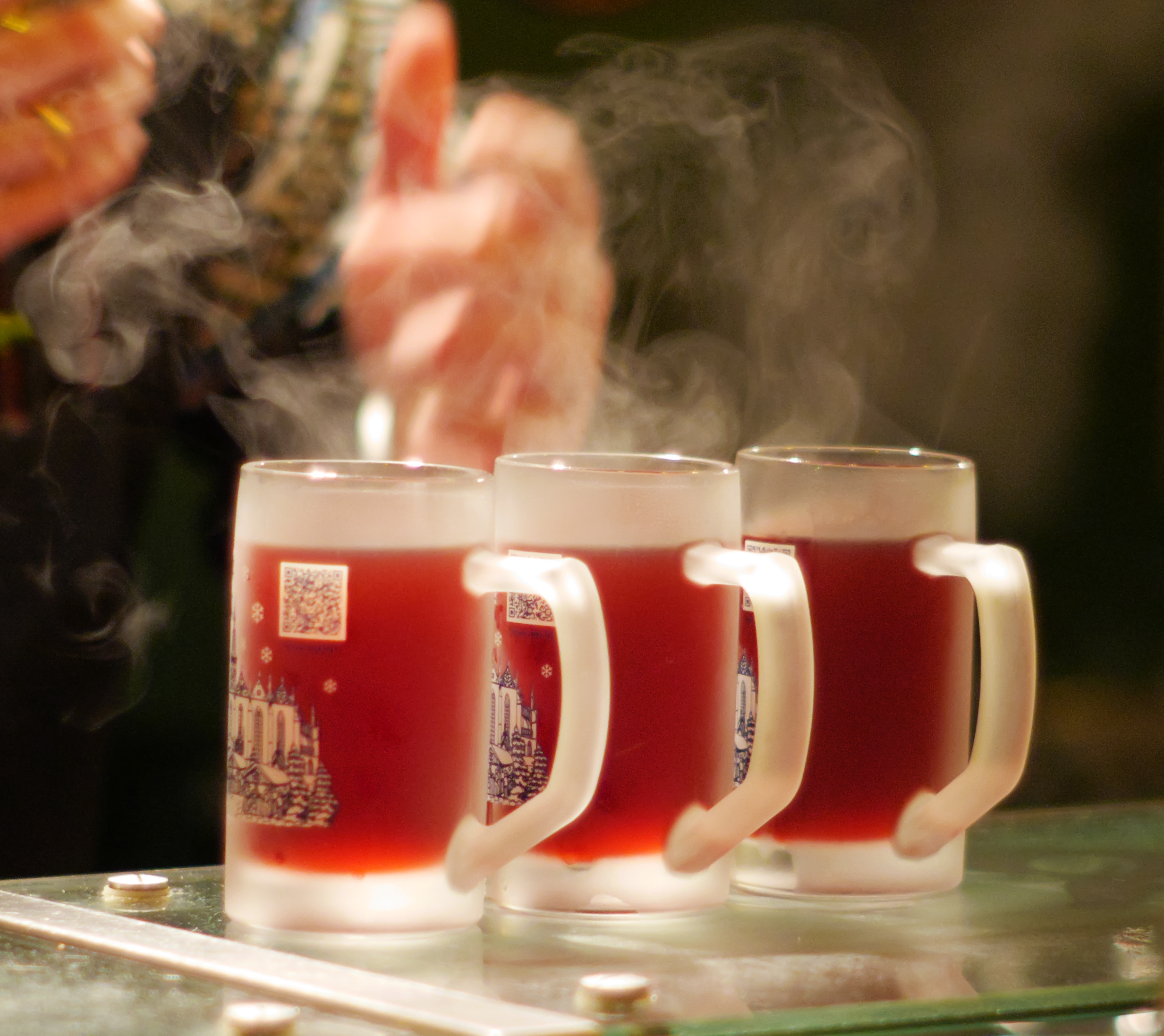
Glühwein (mulled wine), a hot wine drink made in winter

== See also ==
- Slow Food
