= North Food (company) =

Polish fast-food restaurant company

North Food Polska S.A.
- Company type: Joint-stock company
- Industry: Restaurants
- Founded: 2002; 24 years ago
- Headquarters: Kielce, Poland
- Area served: Poland, United Kingdom
- Number of employees: 1000
- Parent: Columbus
- Divisions: North Fish S.A.
- Website: northfood.pl/en/

North Food S.A. is a joint-stock company operating the North Fish S.A. and John Burg restaurant chains in Poland. Founded in 2002, the company headquarters are located in Kielce, Świętokrzyskie Voivodeship.

== Brands ==
- North Fish S.A. is a fast food restaurant chain specialising in fish and seafood dishes. As of November 2017, the restaurant chain operates 40 joints nationwide.

The first North Fish restaurant was opened in the Galeria Echo shopping mall in Kielce, Świętokrzyskie Voivodeship. The restaurant chain operates in the largest settlements in Poland, with the largest concentration of joints found in Warsaw. The restaurant chain operates throughout Poland. The restaurants are generally located in shopping malls as well as major main streets. The first high street restaurant opened in early 2014 by Nowy Świat Street in Warsaw. The broad menu consists of inter alia: fish, Italian-styled sandwiches, wraps, soup and prepared smoothies. The restaurant chain is operated by North Food S.A. with its headquarters located in Kielce.

As of 2015, the restaurant chain additionally operates in the North Fish Plus formula, with the first restaurant having opened in the Wola Park shopping mall in Warsaw. The concept differentiates itself from the main North Fish branding via its wider selection of fish and seafood, i.e. halibut, zander and octopus. The restaurant chain also offers its customers an ice cream parlour. Presently, North Fish Plus is located in eight shopping malls: two in Warsaw and Bydgoszcz, one in Kielce, Kraków, Lublin and Wrocław.

Since 2014, the North Fish S.A. restaurant chain has undergone a brand transformation, including the renovation of its joints with "Norwegian inspired" Scandinavian design interiors, in cooperation with the architecture firm Lorien Group.

- John Burg (stylised as JOHN BURG) is a burger and steak house restaurant chain brand specialising in Black Angus steak. As of November 2017, the concept operates one restaurant in Galeria Echo shopping mall, Kielce. The restaurant chain was founded in 2015.

== Bankruptcy ==
In the early months of 2026, the company declared bankruptcy. The north fish app and social media accounts were suspended on the 26th of march, 2026.
