= Hwajeon =

Korean pan-fried rice cake

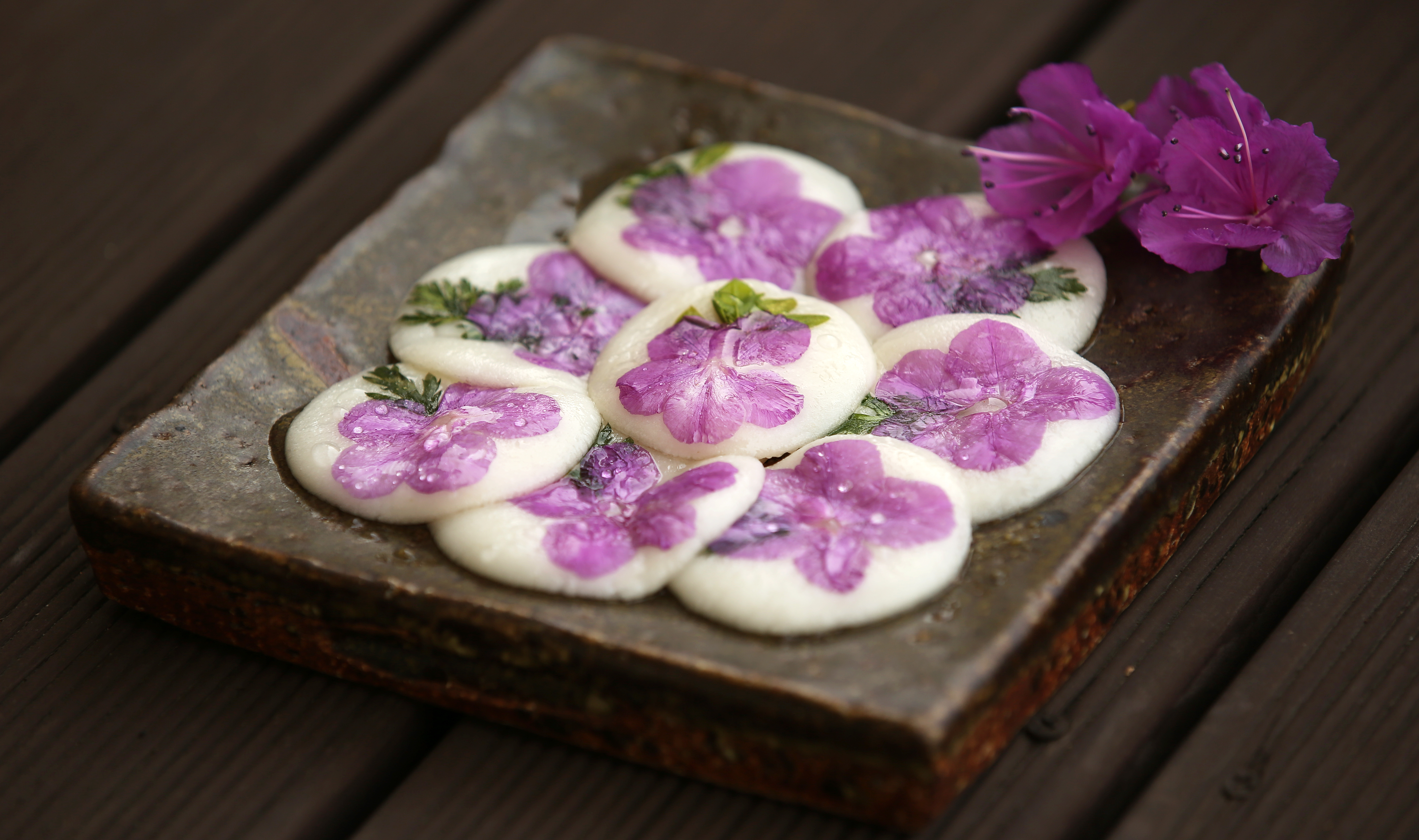
- Jindallae-hwajeon (pan-fried Korean rhododendron rice cakes)
- Type: Jeon, tteok
- Place of origin: Korea
- Associated cuisine: Korean cuisine
- Main ingredients: Edible flowers, glutinous rice flour, honey

Korean name
- Hangul: 화전
- Hanja: 花煎
- RR: hwajeon
- MR: hwajŏn
- IPA: [hwa.dʑʌn]

Other names
- Hangul: 꽃부꾸미; 꽃지지미
- RR: kkotbukkumi; kkotjijimi
- MR: kkotpukkumi; kkotchijimi
- IPA: [k͈ot̚.p͈u.k͈u.mi]; [k͈ot̚.t͈ɕi.dʑi.mi]

Hwajeon, kkotbukkumi, kkotjijimi, (Korean: 화전) or flower cake is a small Korean pan-fried rice cake. It is made out of glutinous rice flour, honey and edible petals from seasonal flowers, such as rhododendron. It is eaten during the festivals of Samjinnal and Buddha's Birthday.

== Etymology ==
The word hwajeon (화전; 花煎) is a compound noun made of the hanja character hwa (화; 花), meaning "flower", and the character jeon (전; 煎), meaning "a pan-fry". The synonyms kkot-bukkumi (꽃부꾸미) and kkot-jijimi (꽃지지미) are also compounds of the native Korean word kkot (꽃), meaning "flower", and bukkumi (부꾸미), meaning a "pan-fried rice cake"; or kkot (꽃) and jijimi (지지미), meaning "pancake".

== Varieties and preparation ==
Hwajeon is made of edible petals from seasonal flowers. Typically, rhododendron, pear flower, goldenbell flower, cherry blossom, and violet are used in spring; rose is used in summer; and chrysanthemum and cockscomb are used in autumn. In winter when flowers are scarce in Korea, alternatives like mugwort leaves, waterdropwort leaves, rock tripe, or jujubes are cut into flower shapes and used instead.

- Beotkkot-hwajeon (벚꽃화전) – cherry blossom
- Gaenari-hwajeon (개나리화전) – goldenbell flower
- Gukhwa-jeon (국화전; 菊花煎) – chrysanthemum
- Ihwa-jeon (이화전; 梨花煎) or
  Baekkot-hwajeon (배꽃화전) – pear flower
- Jangmi-hwajeon (장미화전; 薔薇花煎) – rose
- Jebikkot-hwajeon (제비꽃화전) – violet
- Jindallae-hwajeon (진달래화전) or
  Dugyeonhwa-jeon (두견화전; 杜鵑花煎) – rhododendron
- Maendeurami-hwajeon (맨드라미화전) – cockscomb

There are two main ways of preparing hwajeon:

- Glutinous rice is seasoned with salt, pounded into fine flour, and kneaded with boiling water. The dough is made into a small, round, flat shape and pan-fried in sesame oil. Flower petals are placed and lightly pressed on the dough while frying on the griddle.
- Fine glutinous rice flour is kneaded into thick dough and rolled into 5 mm (0.20 in) thick sheets. Flower petals are then placed onto the dough, lightly pressed, and the sheets are cut with hwajeon-tong, a utensil similar to cookie cutter, with 5 cm (2.0 in) diameter. The flower cakes are fried in sesame oil. This method was used in Korean royal court cuisine.

Fried flower cakes are soaked in honey to add sweetness and sprinkled with cinnamon powder.

== Hwajeon nori ==
Hwajeon nori, which literally translates to "flower cake play", is a tradition of going on a picnic in the mountains to watch the seasonal flowers during spring and autumn.

In spring, women used to go on a picnic, carrying a glutinous rice flour and griddle near a stream on Samjinnal which falls on every third day of the third lunar month in the Korean calendar. They picked edible spring blossoms and made hwajeon. The variety made with rhododendron is regarded as the most representative hwajeon. It is traditionally eaten with rhododendron punch consisting of the same flower floating in honeyed or magnolia berry water.

Similarly, people enjoyed hwajeon nori in autumn, with hwajeon which is made with chrysanthemum flowers and leaves. It was consumed with chrysanthemum wine or yuja punch. The custom is closely related to the Junggu, the traditional holiday falls on every ninth day of the ninth lunar month in the Korean calendar.

These customs date back to the Three Kingdoms era (57 BCE ‒ 668 AD) and originated in Silla.

== See also ==
- Hwachae
