= Kochlöffel =

German fast food restaurant chain

Kochlöffel GmbH
- Industry: Restaurants
- Founded: 1961; 65 years ago in Lingen, Germany
- Founders: Martha and Clemens van den Berg
- Area served: Germany, Poland (as Conieco) and Turkey
- Key people: Martha van den Berg (managing director)
- Products: fast food
- Revenue: 43.0 million euros (2012, sum GmbH and franchise partners)
- Total assets: €8.6 million (December 31, 2012)
- Website: kochloeffel.de

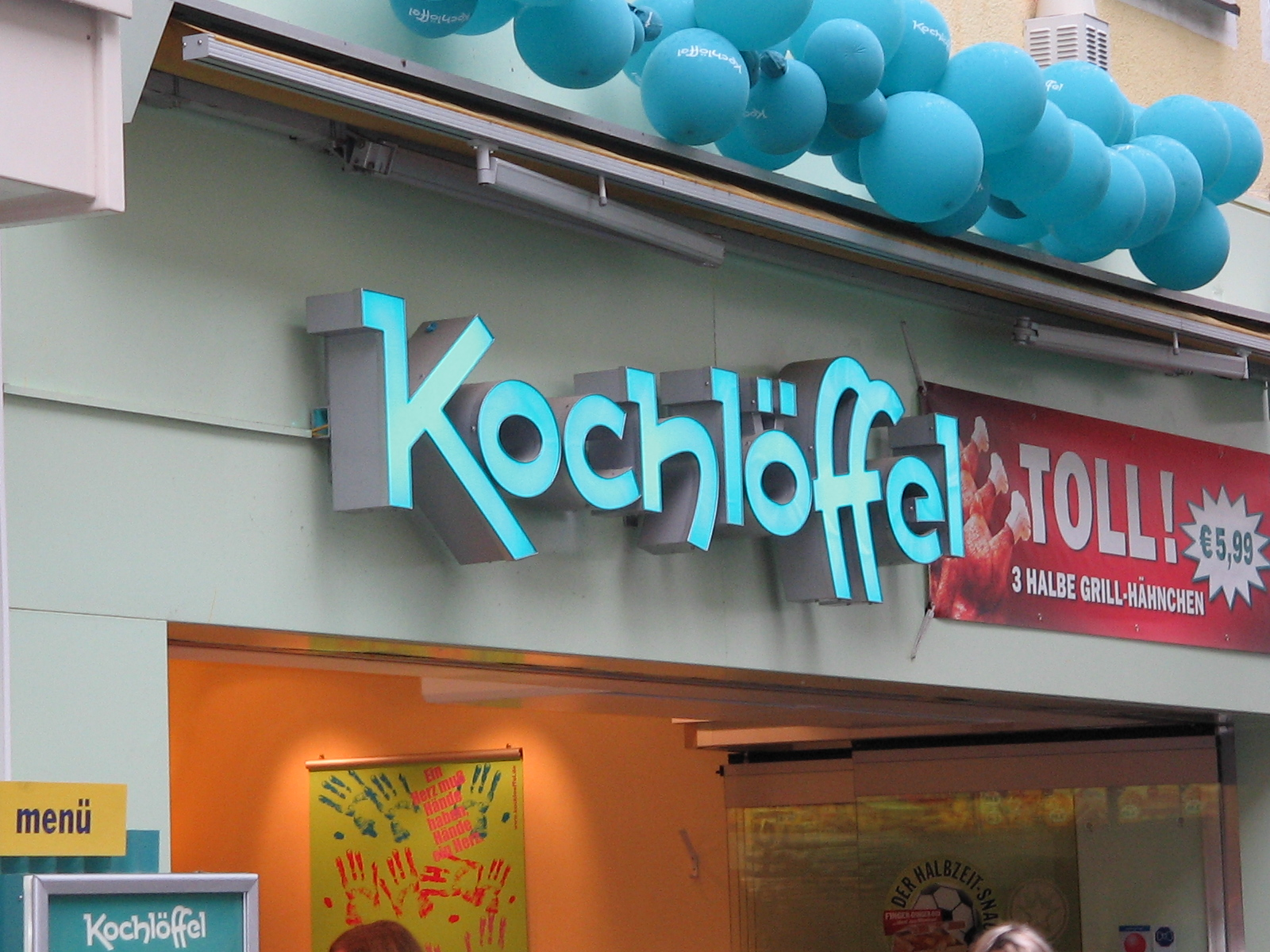
Neon sign above the entrance to a Kochlöffel restaurant.

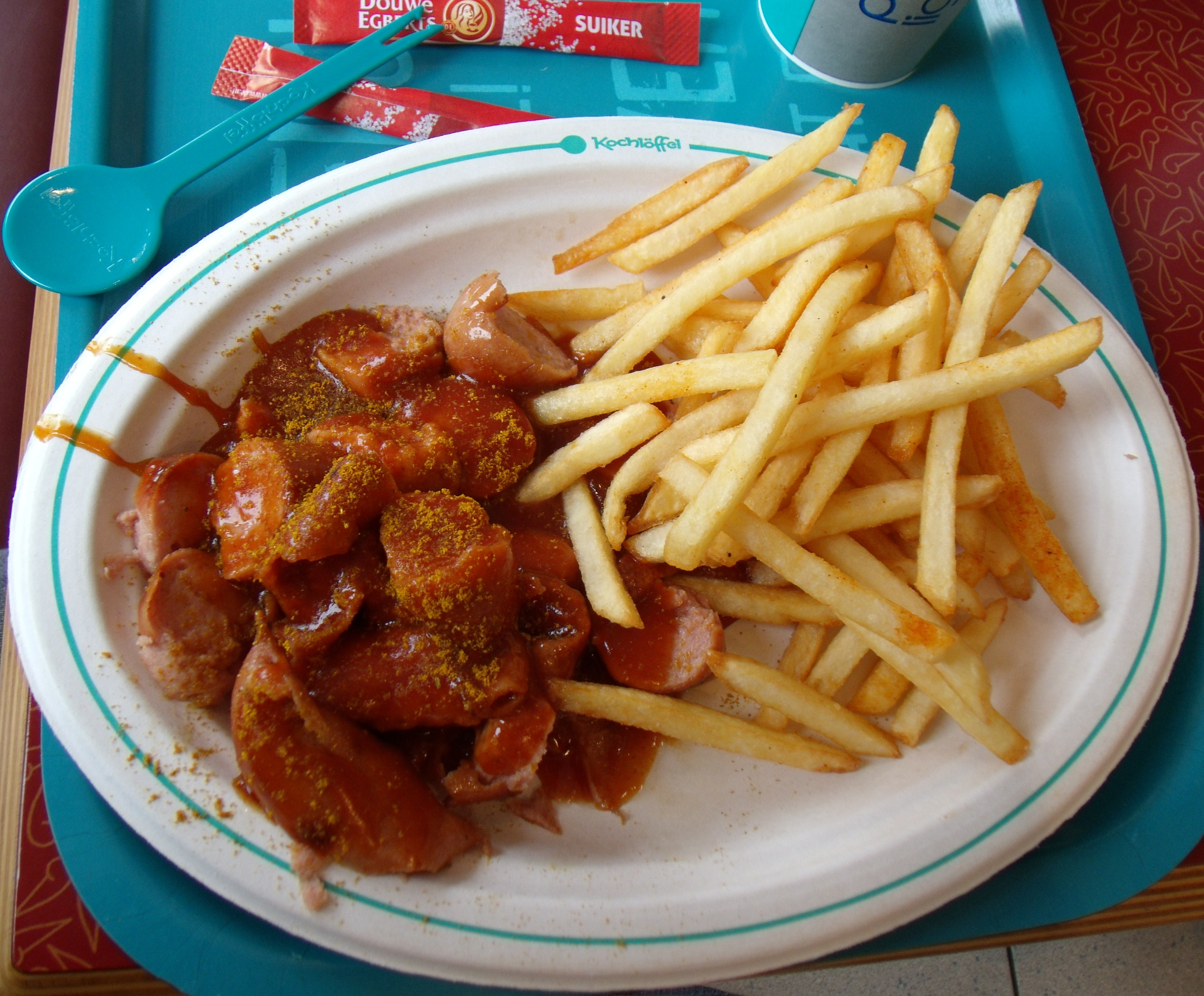
Currywurst meal served at Kochlöffel in 2012. The chain's signature spoon can be seen on the top left.

Kochlöffel (literal English translation: "cooking spoon") is a German fast-food restaurant chain. Its product range includes hamburgers, chicken, bratwurst, currywurst and french fries with their signature turquoise plastic fork resembling a cooking spoon.

== Sales ==
In 2012 the company sold 3 million grilled half chickens, 6.7 million Hamburgers, 1.4 million sausages, 0.4 million servings of salad, some 1,000 tons of French fries and 1.4 million liters of drinks. The restaurant chain had approximately 11.5 million customers in 2012 hosted in its roughly 90 restaurants.

== History ==
The first Kochlöffel restaurant was opened in 1961. Martha and Clemens van den Berg drove expansion in the 1970s and 80s. Their daughter Julia and her husband Torsten Hessler took over in 2010, together with Mrs van den Berg is the manager of the restaurant chain. In the 1990s the previous red logo was replaced with the current turquoise.

== Expansion ==
Kochlöffel have traded in Poland since 1995, under the name "Conieco." In addition, Kochlöffel exported its concept in cooperation with a master licensee in Turkey. Since 1995 the company parts of restaurants operates under franchise.
