= Galeria Echo =

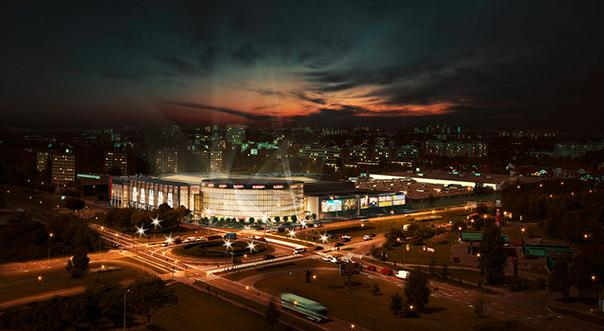
- Location: Kielce, Świętokrzyskie Voivodeship, Poland
- Coordinates: 50°52′47″N 20°38′40″E
- Address: 20 Świętokrzyska Street
- Opened: 30 November 2002
- Developer: Echo Investment
- Owner: Echo Investment
- Num. of stores: 300
- Num. of anchor tenants: 1
- Floor area: 66,000 m^{2} (710,000 sq ft)
- Floors: 4
- Parking: 2300
- Website: galeriaecho.pl

Galeria Echo is a shopping centre in Kielce in Southern Poland. Developed by Echo Investment, Galeria Echo opened on 30 November 2002. From 2009 to 2011, it underwent a remodeling project designed by the local architectural studio Detan, while the facade and interior design were by the Warsaw-based architectural studio Open Architekci.
