= Sowa Patisserie =

Patisserie company, 1946, Bydgoszcz, Poland

Coordinates: 53°06′52″N 17°57′27″E

Cukiernia Sowa
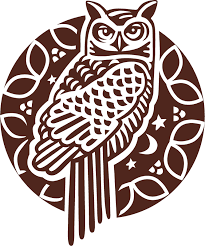
- Cukiernia Sowa
- Type: Firm
- Industry: Pâtisserie
- Founded: 1946 in Bydgoszcz, Poland
- Founder: Stanisława and Feliks Sowa
- Headquarters: Bydgoszcz, Poland
- Number of locations: 160 selling points
- Area served: Poland, Berlin (Germany) & London (England)
- Key people: Sowa family
- Products: Pastries, sweets
- Owner: Sowa family
- Website: cukierniasowa.pl

The Sowa Company is a family-run patisserie firm created in 1946, in Bydgoszcz, Poland. In May 2022, the enterprise had 160 shops and selling points in Poland, Germany (Berlin) and England (London).

== History ==
=== PRL Period (1946–1989) ===
In 1946, Feliks and Stanisława Sowa opened a bakery at 55 Pomorska Street in Bydgoszcz. The shop is still operating to this day. They were both originating from a village between Grudziądz and Brodnica.

At the time, the political regime was far from being propitious to such a venture. Not only all enterprises with more than 50 employees were nationalized, but also the post-war communist economic system hindered private initiatives. In addition, raw materials were scarce and the workforce limited.

The post-war period and the growing communist rule turned out to be very unfavorable for taking up self-employment business. Stanisława Sowa remembered in an interview: Supply standards were then so low that we had to buy precious flour or sugar in a store, and because such purchases were subject to numerous restrictions, we combined all kinds of ways. Everyone helped: family, friends, and sometimes even complete strangers, kind people. [...] that was something! Like other bakers in the city, the success stemmed from their selling fresh bread which was not available everywhere, just after the war.

The bakery operated so efficiently that Feliks and Stanisława hired in 1952 their first employees: one at the production plant, the other at the selling point. Soon, however, it appeared they were short in workforce, regarding the fast growing load of daily duties: students were hired together with the first apprentice.

In the early 1960s, Feliks Sowa graduated with a degree as "Confectionery Master". Then, based on traditional family recipes, he created his first, unique cake: a sponge cake filled with fruit jam and covered with thick, milk chocolate. It soon proved to be a best seller as it singled out from the then industrial company cakes stuffed with a lot of very sweet cream.

As recalled Stanisława Sowa (1921–2021), We were very lucky. We had a relatively little activity. The state allowed it, because strategic hopes were placed in us, small but resilient producers. As a result, we were a bit protected since at that time most of private initiatives were either closed immediately or taken over by the authorities. Their thinking was simple: if, in the event of a nationwide armed threat, a large centralized plant was destroyed, the damage would have been considerable and far-reaching, whereas small bakeries scattered around the country provided a much greater security. Such tensions stemmed from the post-tensions lasted for a very long time.

In 1982, Adam Sowa, Feliks and Stanisława's younger son, left his studies in construction and joined the family business. A year later, he got his Master of Confectionery's diploma, following his father's footsteps.

The success of the products in conjunction with the word of mouth in the city prompted the opening in 1988 of the first store, detached from the factory. This new selling point was located downtown, near the Zbożowy Rynek (Grain Market).

=== Cukiernia i Piekarnia Adam Sowa (from 1989) ===
Adam Sowa and his wife Małgorzata set up in 1989 a new company.

In parallel with the economic transition of Poland, the company grew and employed more and more personnel while expanding the panel of its products. Hence in 1991, the first Adam Sowa Café was unveiled on Dworcowa Street.

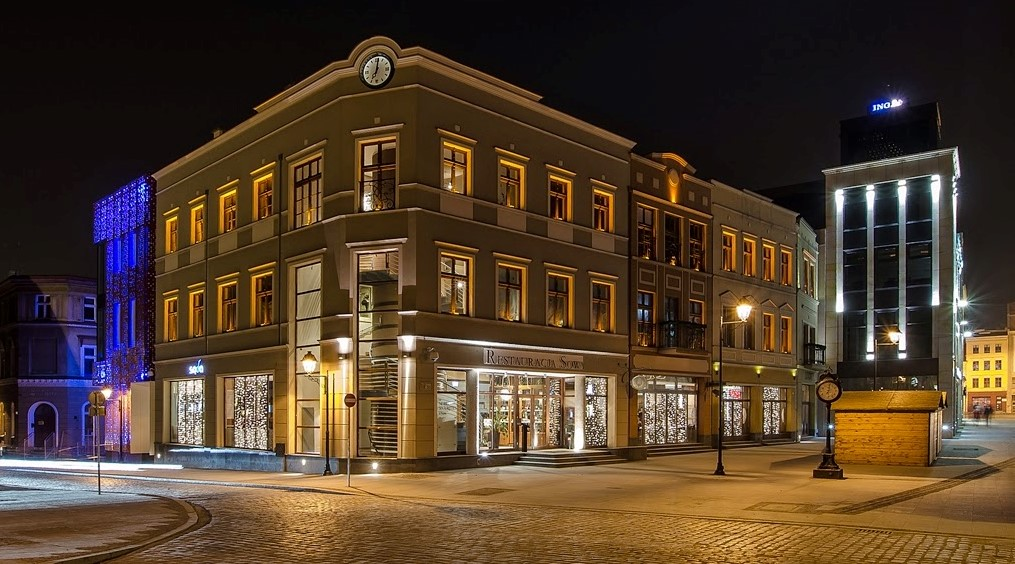
Sowa restaurant, 4 Mostowa, by night

At the end of 1997, to cope with the accrued success, it was decided to plan for the construction of a larger production plant. A plot in the south east area of Bydgoszcz, on Józef Schulz street, was then purchased. The modern factory was opened a year later: today it houses also the company's headquarters.

In 2003, the first Sowa Restaurant was unveiled, at the heart of Bydgoszcz, on Mostowa Street. Still operative today, it displays the "Sowa design" and comprises a wine bar. The original menu proposes international cuisine with a home-made Polish accent.

In addition to Polish openings, the first international restaurant was inaugurated in 2005, in London on High Street. Four years later, a dine-in patisserie was unveiled in Berlin on Westfälische Strasse. At the same time, the first point in Warsaw opened: in 2022, the company had 22 selling points in the Polish capital.

Cukiernia i Piekarnia Adam Sowa celebrated the fiftieth anniversary of its initial foundation in 2006. A year later, the firm took up an impressive challenge: to re-construct an entire block at the corner of Mostowa and Grodzka streets, with its pre-war features. The project was completed in 2009 and comprised a restaurant, a bistro, a cafe and a fashionable night club.

Adam Sowa unveiled in 2007 a plaque with its signature in "Bydgoszcz's Autograph Avenue", Długa street.

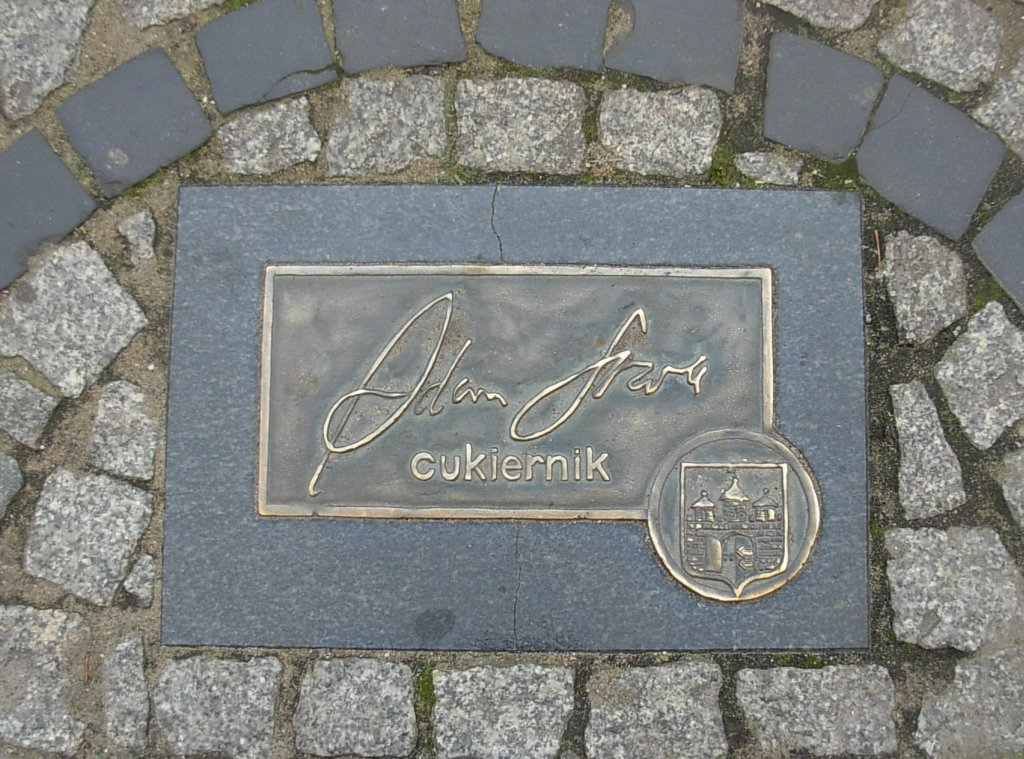
Adam Sowa's signature plaque on Długa street

As soon as 2010, Adam's children joined the company, reinforcing its family tradition: Aleksandra, a Confectionery Master, on the creative side and Michał in sales and marketing.

In 2022, more than 160 Sowa selling points are open in more than 60 cities in Poland and in Europe. Its main plant in Bydgoszcz employ over a thousand personnel.

== Restaurants, flats and hotel ==
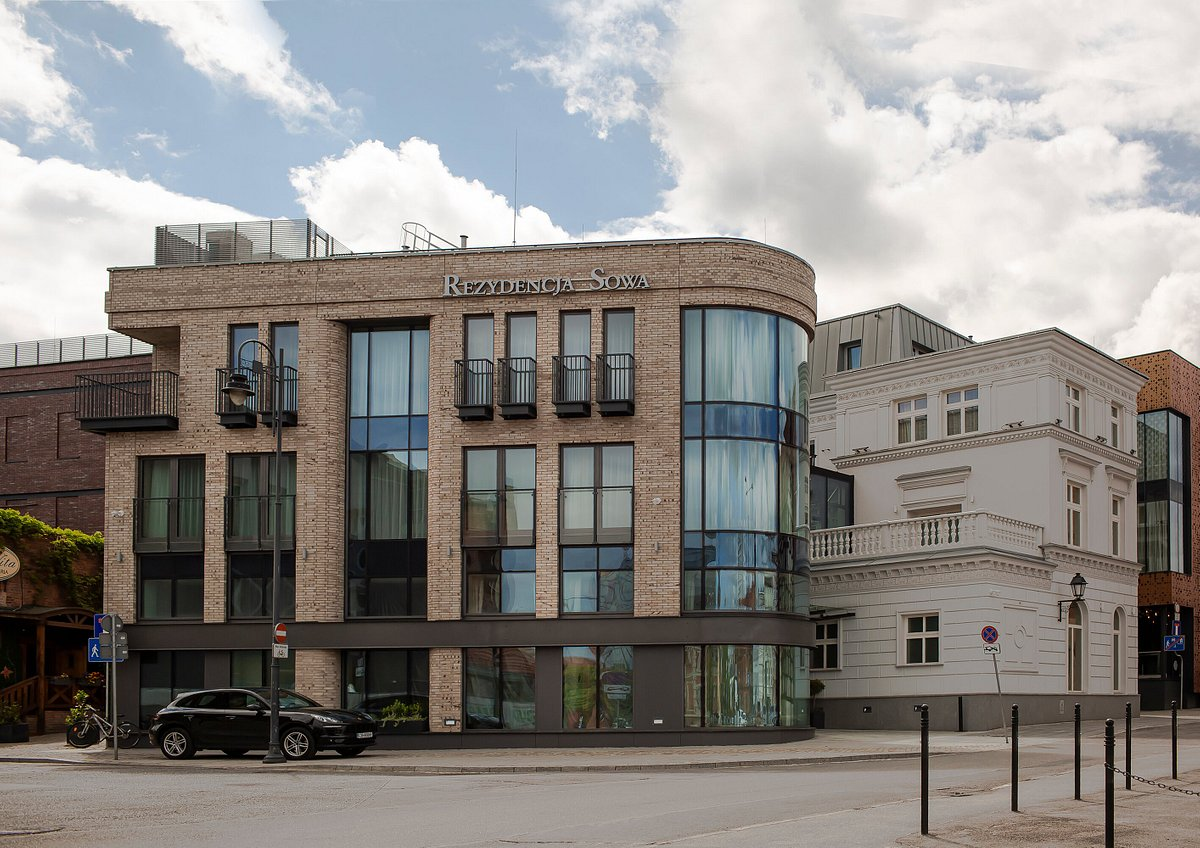
"Rezydencja Sowa" in Bydgoszcz

In 2022, three "Sowa Restauracja" have been operating: two in Bydgoszcz and one in Toruń.

The company has been offering apartments for renting:

- in Toruń, at 4 Staromiejska street. The building is a historic tenement house, which used to be site of the Royal Pharmacy since 1389;
- in historic downtown Gdańsk, at 13–15 Długa street;
- in Bydgoszcz, at 57 Długa street, since August 2019.

In Bydgoszcz, "Rezydencja Sowa", a hotel, opened at 12 Grodzka street in 2022. The premises along the Brda river, dating from 1549, are located in the former city baths. They have been thoroughly restored in 2020–2022.

== Commemorations and Social actions ==
In 2018, the Polish newspaper Gazeta Wyborcza, as part of the 100th anniversary of Polish Independence (Sto Firm na stulecie – 100 firms for 100 years), included the "Cukiernia Sowa" in a list of 100 Polish companies, iconic of the nation together with other entreprises like E. Wedel, Inglot Cosmetics, Wawel, Platige Image or Comarch.

In 2021, Sowa company was rated as the "most-recommended brand in Poland" by the firm YouGov, ahead of other famous brands such as Allegro or 4F.

The same year, on 14 December, Stanisława Sowa died, aged 100.

Sowa company pursues a policy of active social involvement, financially supporting, among others, the Pomeranian Philharmonic, the Polish Theater in Bydgoszcz, the Opera Nova, the Toruń Symphony Orchestra, Bydgoszcz Music Schools, sports club (Polonia Bydgoszcz.)

Furthermore, it helps the Polish branch of Sue Ryder Association and every year, the company prepares Christmas packages for children and sponsors concerts for children.

== See also ==
- Bydgoszcz
- Grodzka Street in Bydgoszcz
- Pâtisserie

== Bibliography ==
- (in Polish) "70. urodziny Cukierni Sowa. Rodzina to siła bydgoskiej marki". plus.pomorska.pl. Polska Press Sp. z o. o. 2009.
