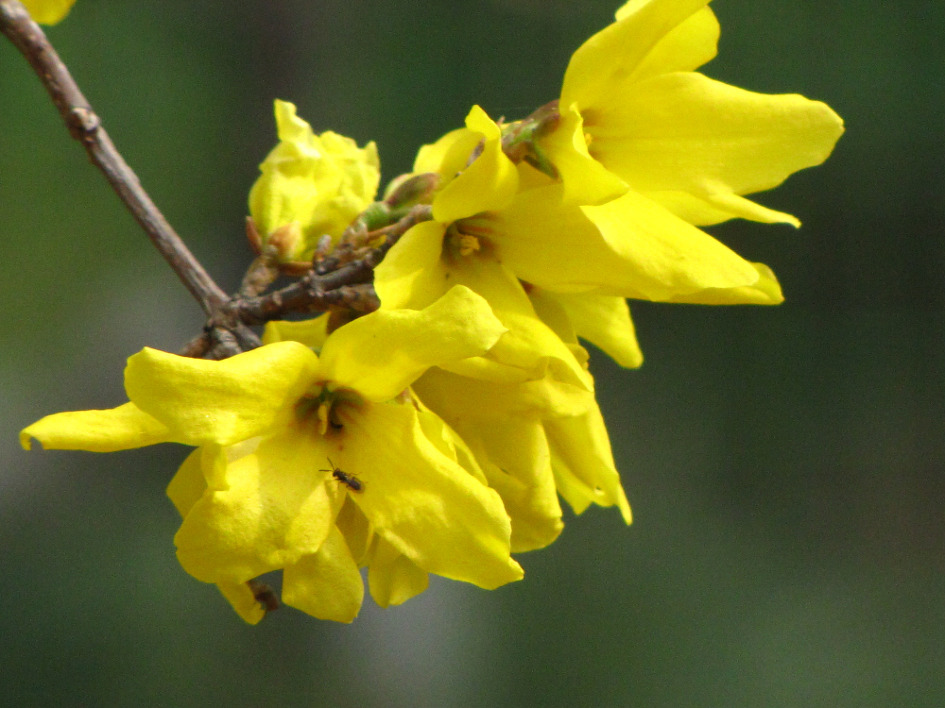

Scientific classification
- Kingdom: Plantae
- Clade: Embryophytes
- Clade: Tracheophytes
- Clade: Spermatophytes
- Clade: Angiosperms
- Clade: Eudicots
- Clade: Asterids
- Order: Lamiales
- Family: Oleaceae
- Genus: Forsythia
- Species: F. koreana

Binomial name
- Forsythia koreana (Rehder) Nakai

Synonyms
- Forsythia koreana var. autumnalis Uyeki; Forsythia koreana f. autumnalis (Uyeki) Nakai; Forsythia koreana var. pilosa (U.C.La & Chae G.Chen) U.C.La; Forsythia pilosa U.C.La & Chae G.Chen; Forsythia viridissima var. koreana Rehder; Rangium koreanum (Rehder) Ohwi; Rangium koreanum var. autumnalis (Uyeki) Uyeki

= Forsythia koreana =

Species of flowering plant in the olive family

Forsythia koreana, commonly called gaenari (Hangul: 개나리) or Korean goldenbell tree, is a species in the olive family, Oleaceae. It grows to about 3 m (9.8 ft). The leaves are oval in shape, have teeth, and are 3–12 cm (1.2–4.7 in) long. The front of the leaf is dark green and the back is dark blue, but both sides are hairless.
