= Double Third Festival =

East Asian spring festival

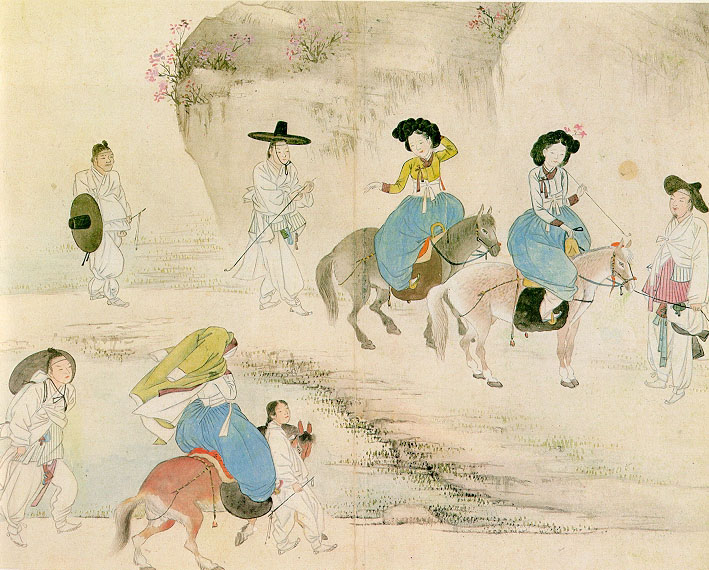
- "Yeonso dapcheong" drawn by Hyewon which depicts an outing in spring.
- Also called: Third-month Third
- Observed by: Chinese, Koreans, Japanese
- Type: Cultural
- Significance: Marks arrival of spring
- Date: 3rd day of the 3rd lunar month
- 2025 date: 31 March
- 2026 date: 19 April
- 2027 date: 9 April
- 2028 date: 28 March
- Frequency: Annual
- Related to: Shangsi Festival, Samjinnal, Hinamatsuri

Key Holiday
- Chinese: 三月三日
- Literal meaning: Third-month Third(-day)
Transcriptions
Standard Mandarin
- Hanyu Pinyin: Sānyuèsān
- Wade–Giles: San^{1}-yüeh^{4}-san^{1}

Shangsi Festival
- Traditional Chinese: 上巳節紀念日
- Simplified Chinese: 上巳节紀念节
Transcriptions
Standard Mandarin
- Hanyu Pinyin: Shàngsìjié
- Wade–Giles: Shang^{4}-ssŭ^{4}-chieh^{2}

The Double Third Festival (Chinese: 三月三; pinyin: sānyuèsān) sometimes also called the Washing Festival is a traditional holiday originating from China, and is celebrated in multiple East Asian countries, including China and Korea.

== China ==
The Double Third Festival (Chinese: 三月三; pinyin: sānyuèsān) or Shangsi Festival (traditional Chinese: 上巳節; simplified Chinese: 上巳节), sometimes translated as the Washing Festival, is a Chinese holiday celebrated on the third day of the third month of the Chinese calendar.

It is said that the origin of this festival comes from the Dinner Party at the Qushui River during the Zhou Dynasty (about 1100–221 BC). Others say its origins come from the ceremonial custom of getting rid of evils by bathing in the river. On this day, people would hold a sacrificing ceremony on a riverside to honor their ancestors, and then take a bath in the river with herbs to cleanse their bodies of filth. Following that, young men and women would then go for a spring outing in which many of these scenes were described in Shi Jing (The Book of Songs).

The Shangsi Festival activities have changed over the course of subsequent dynasties. The entertainment feast and praying for descendants along the riverside were added in the Han Dynasty (206 BC-220 AD). It was after the Wei and Jin dynasties (220–420 AD) that the festival developed into the Double-Third (Shangsi) Festival that is fixed on the third day of the third lunar month.

In modern times, to observe this festival, people would go for an outing by the water, have picnics, and pluck orchids. It is also a day for invoking cleansing rituals to prevent disease and get rid of bad luck. The day is also traditionally considered to be a possible birthday of the Yellow Emperor.

The ancient traditions of Shangsi are mostly celebrated by several communities spread out among the provinces today, such as the ancient village of Xinye which holds elaborate ancestor worship ceremonies on this day.

The great calligrapher Wang Xizhi mentions this festival in his famous work Preface to the Orchid Pavilion Poems, written in regard to the Orchid Pavilion Gathering during the Six Dynasties era.

In Zhuang Culture, the festival has higher prominence and is celebrated with songs and dance performances as well as a variety of games and foods.

== Japan ==
In Japan, the Double Third festival is celebrated as Hinamatsuri.

== Korea ==
Samjinnal is one of sesi pungsok (세시풍속) or Korean traditional customs by season, which falls on the third day of the third month in the Chinese calendar. It was called samjil (삼질) in old Korean language and referred to as sangsa, wonsa (원사, 元巳), sungsam (중삼, 重三), sangje (상제, 上除) or dapcheongjeol (답청절, 踏靑節) in hanja. Samjinnal implies the overlapping of Sam (three). According to Choi Namseon, samjil was derived from the consonants of Samil, and Sangsa is defined as the first snake day of the 3rd lunar month.

=== Customs ===
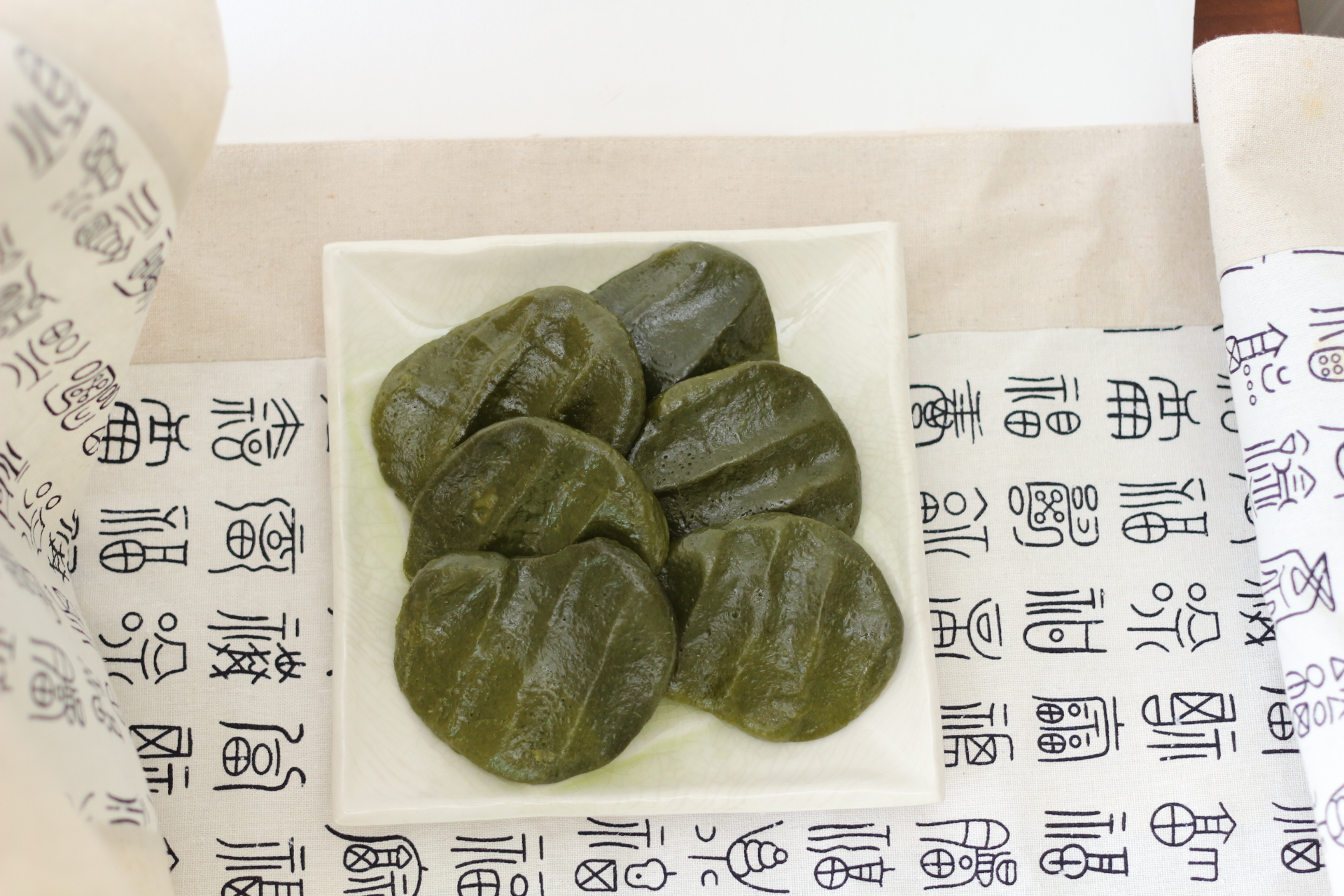
ssuktteok, mugwort rice cakes

During Samjinnal, people traditionally picked out jindallae (Korean azalea blossoms) to decorate kneaded glutinous rice dough to make Hwajeon, a Korean traditional rice cake. Mung bean powder is used to make mung bean noodles, and is also occasionally decorated with the jindallae. By dyeing the mung bean powder with red water, a seasonal dish called Sumyeon can be prepared. Additionally, white bubble rice cakes made with red bean paste called Santteok; Goritteok made from glutinous rice, pine endodermis and mugwort; and Ssuktteok, made from glutinous rice and mugwort leaves, are eaten this day.

=== Nori (Folk games) ===
- Pulssaum (풀싸움)
- Pulgaksi noleum (풀각시놀음)
- Fortunetelling
- Hwajeon nori (화전놀이, 花煎--) – It literally means "flower pancake play".

== See also ==
- Dragon Boat Festival
- Mid-autumn Festival
- Lantern Festival
- Qingming Festival
- Chuseok
- Dano
