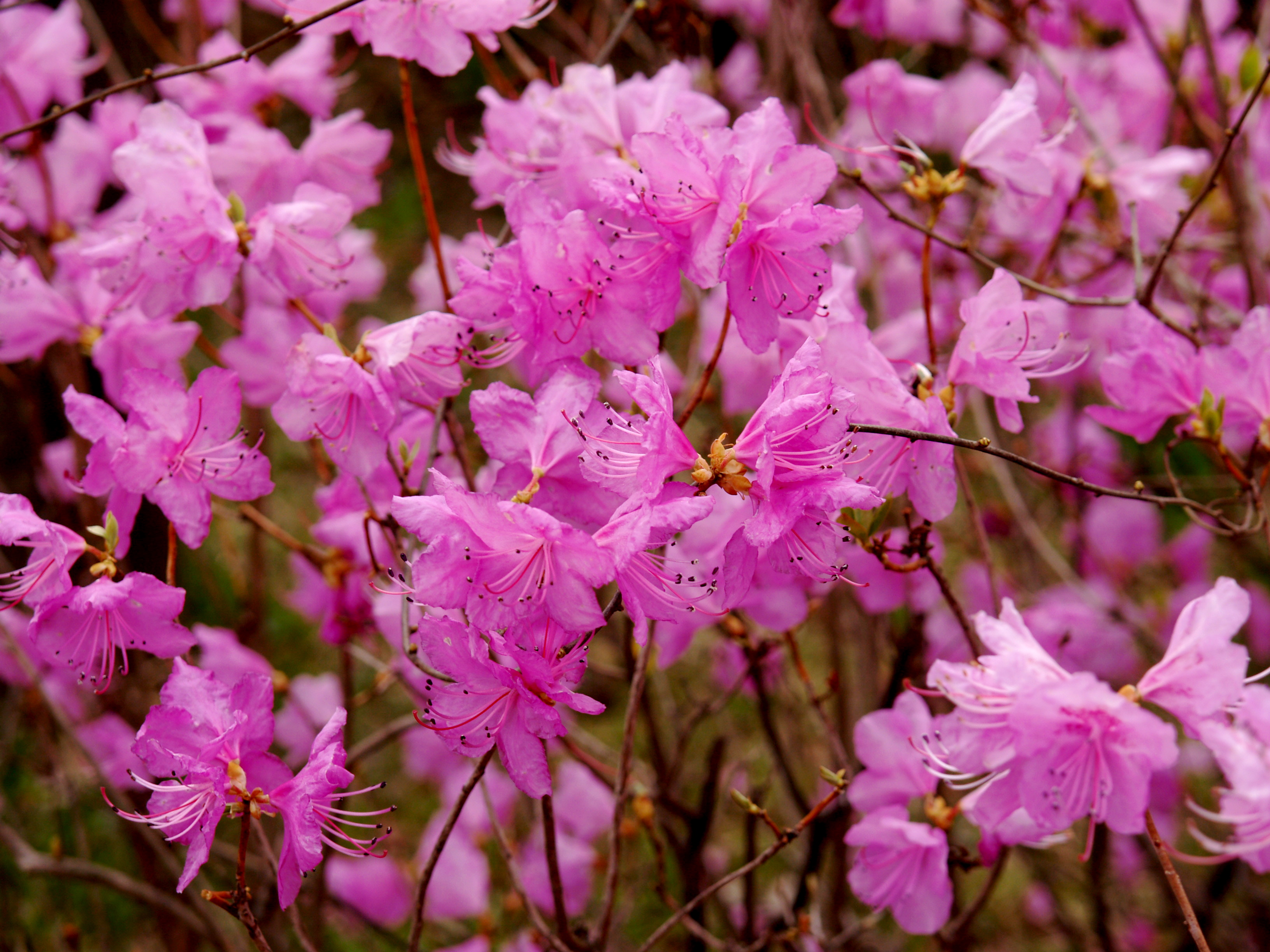
- In a park in Goyang, in Gyeonggi Province, South Korea

Scientific classification
- Kingdom: Plantae
- Clade: Embryophytes
- Clade: Tracheophytes
- Clade: Spermatophytes
- Clade: Angiosperms
- Clade: Eudicots
- Clade: Asterids
- Order: Ericales
- Family: Ericaceae
- Genus: Rhododendron
- Species: R. mucronulatum

Binomial name
- Rhododendron mucronulatum Turcz.

Synonyms
- Rhododendron dauricum subsp. mucronulatum (Turcz.) Vorosch.; Rhododendron mucronulatum var. chejuense Davidian; Rhododendron mucronulatum var. lucidum Nakai; Rhododendron mucronulatum f. ciliatum (Nakai) Kitag.; Rhododendron mucronulatum f. leucanthum T.Yamaz.; Rhododendron mucronulatum f. lucidum (Nakai) M.Kim; Rhododendron taquetii H.Lév.

= Rhododendron mucronulatum =

Species of flowering plant

Rhododendron mucronulatum, the Korean rhododendron or Korean rosebay (Korean: 진달래; RR: Jindallae), is a rhododendron species native to Korea, Mongolia, Russia, and parts of northern China. It is a deciduous shrub that grows to 1–2 m (3.3–6.6 ft) in height, with elliptic or elliptic-lanceolate leaves, 3–7 cm (1 1/4–2 3/4 in) long by 1–3.5 cm (3/8–1 3/8 in) wide. The reddish-purple flowers appear in late winter or early spring, often on the bare branches before the foliage unfurls. It inhabits forested regions at 1,600–2,300 m (5,200–7,500 ft).

The Latin specific epithet mucronulatum means "sharply pointed", referring to the leaf shape.

== Cultivation ==
The cultivar 'Cornell Pink' has light pink flowers, and has gained the Royal Horticultural Society's Award of Garden Merit. It is hardy down to −20 °C (−4 °F) but like most rhododendron species requires a sheltered position in dappled shade with acid soil that has been enriched with leaf mould.

== Culinary use ==
In Korea, the flowers are used in pan-fried flower cakes called hwajeon, which are traditional for Samjinnal, a spring festival. It is also used in infused liquor.

== Gallery ==
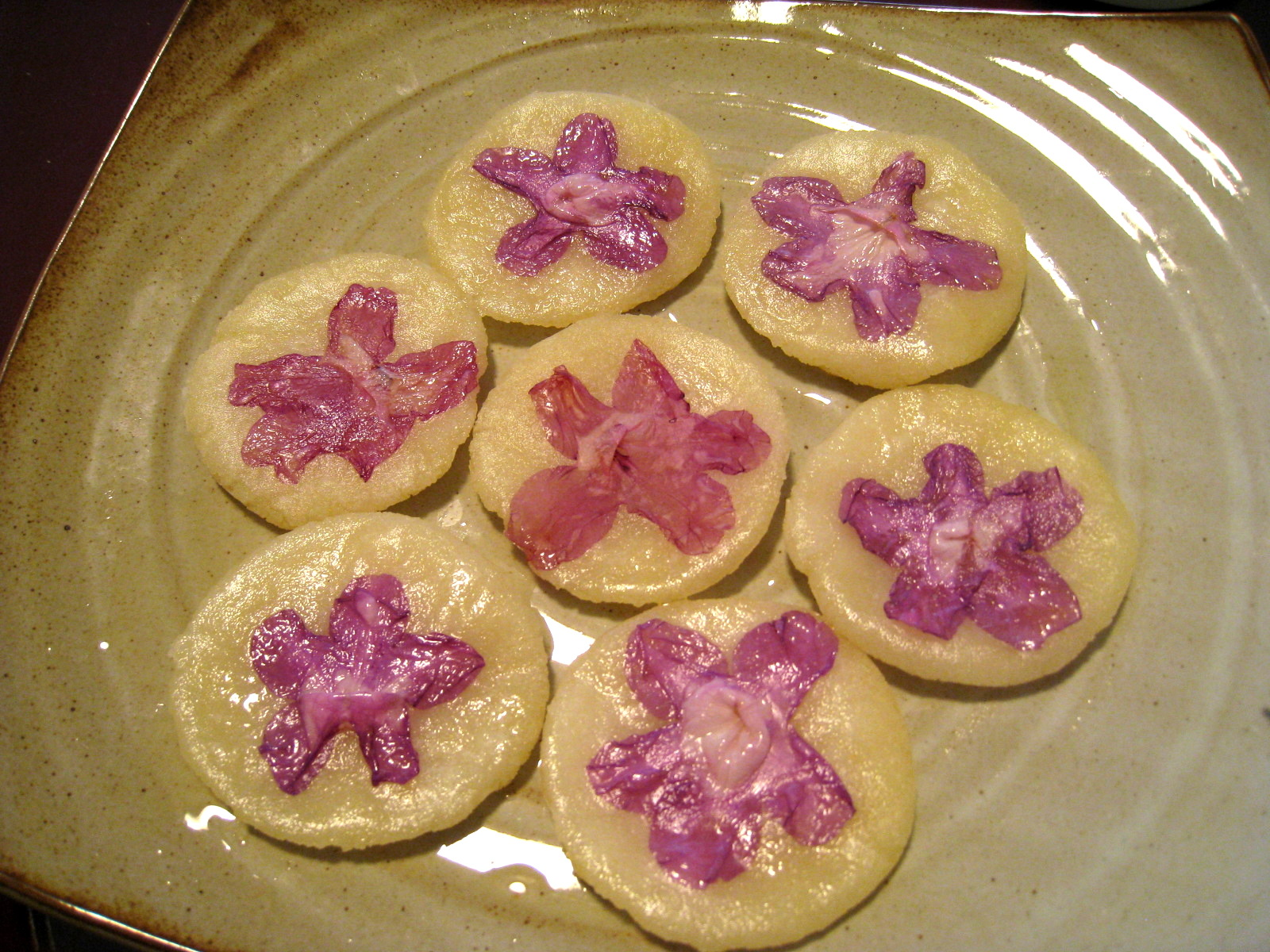
Jindallae-hwajeon (pan-fried rhododendron flower cake)

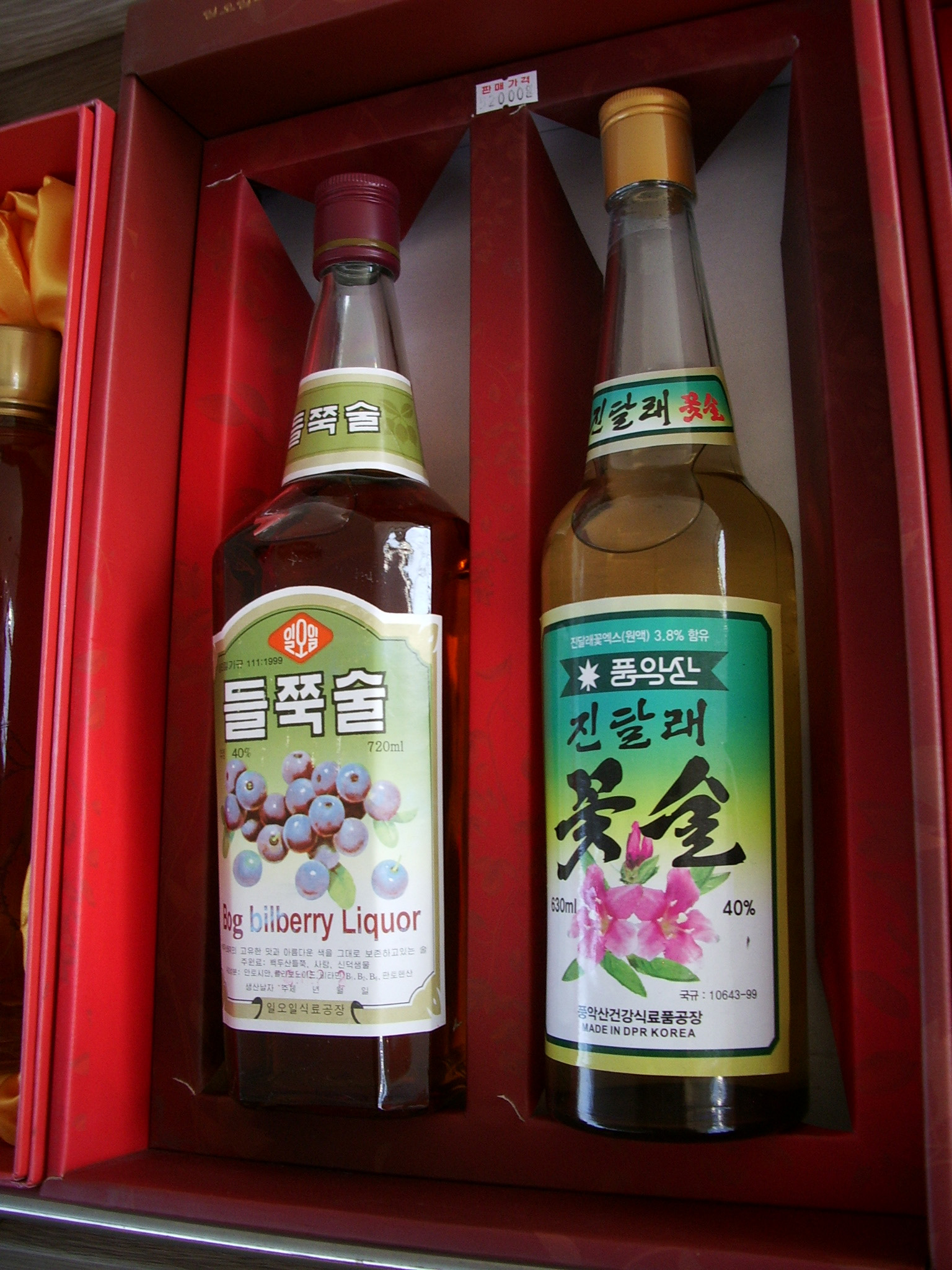
Deuljjuk-sul (bog bilberry liquor) and jindallae-sul (Korean rhododendron liquor) produced in North Korea

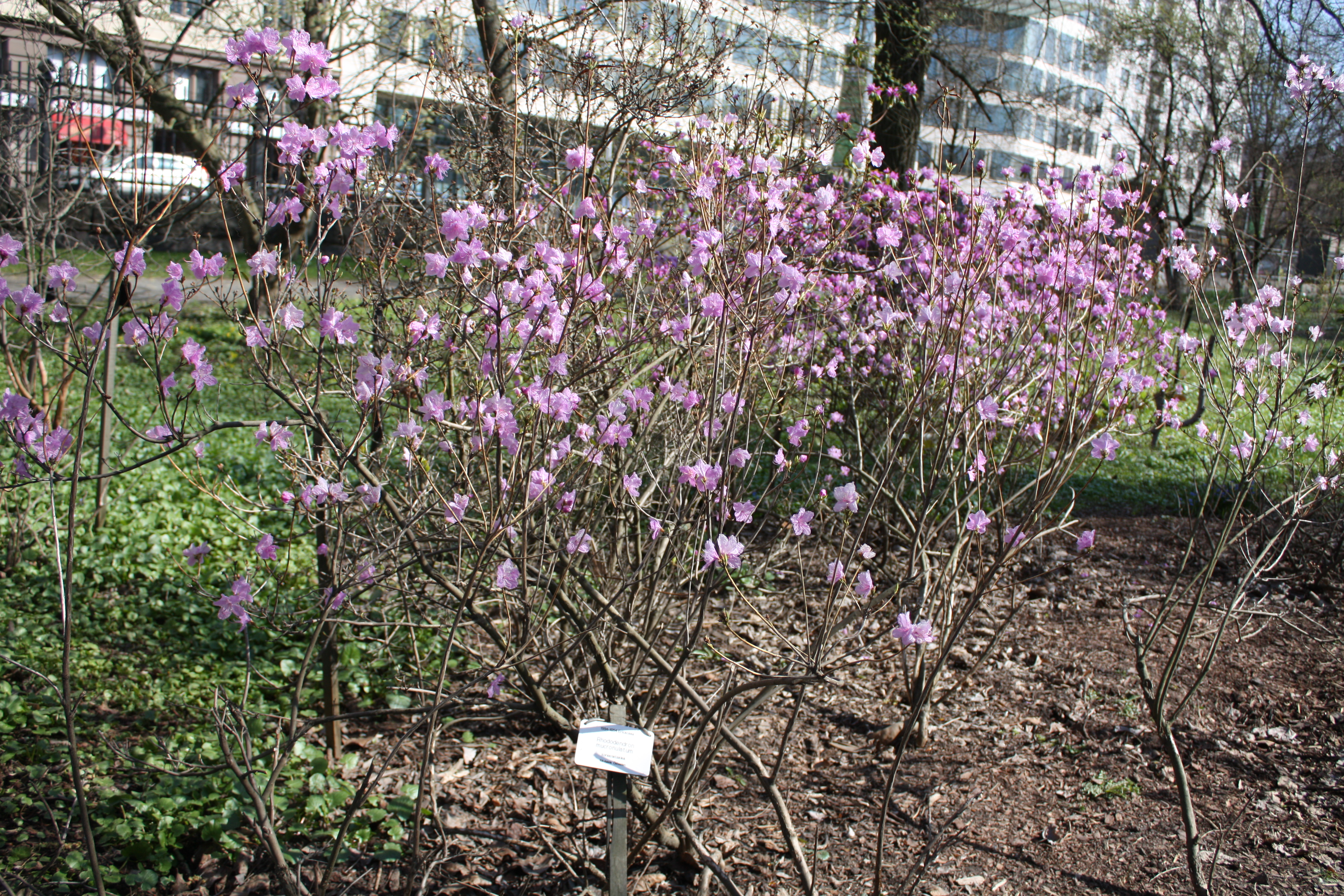
Helsinki University Botanical Garden

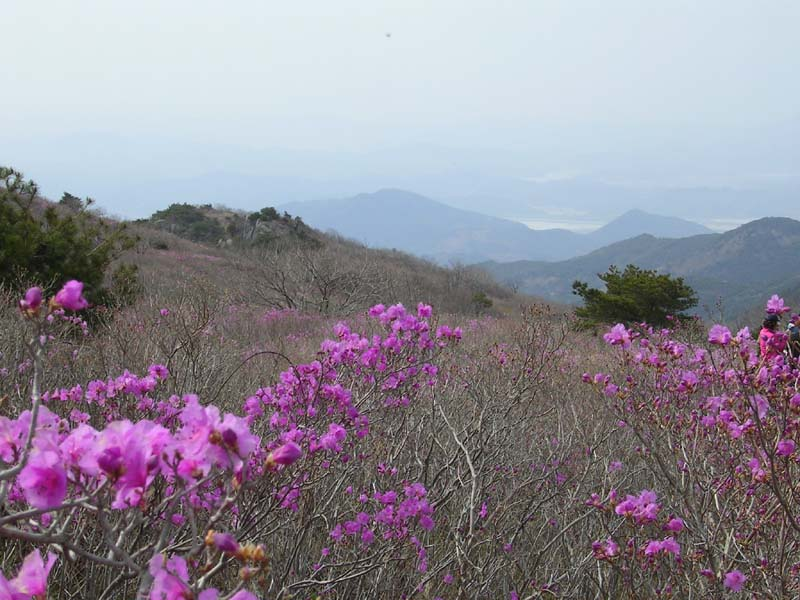
Azalea Valley, Mt. Biseul, Korea
