= Yuja-hwachae =

Variety of tradional Korean fruit punch

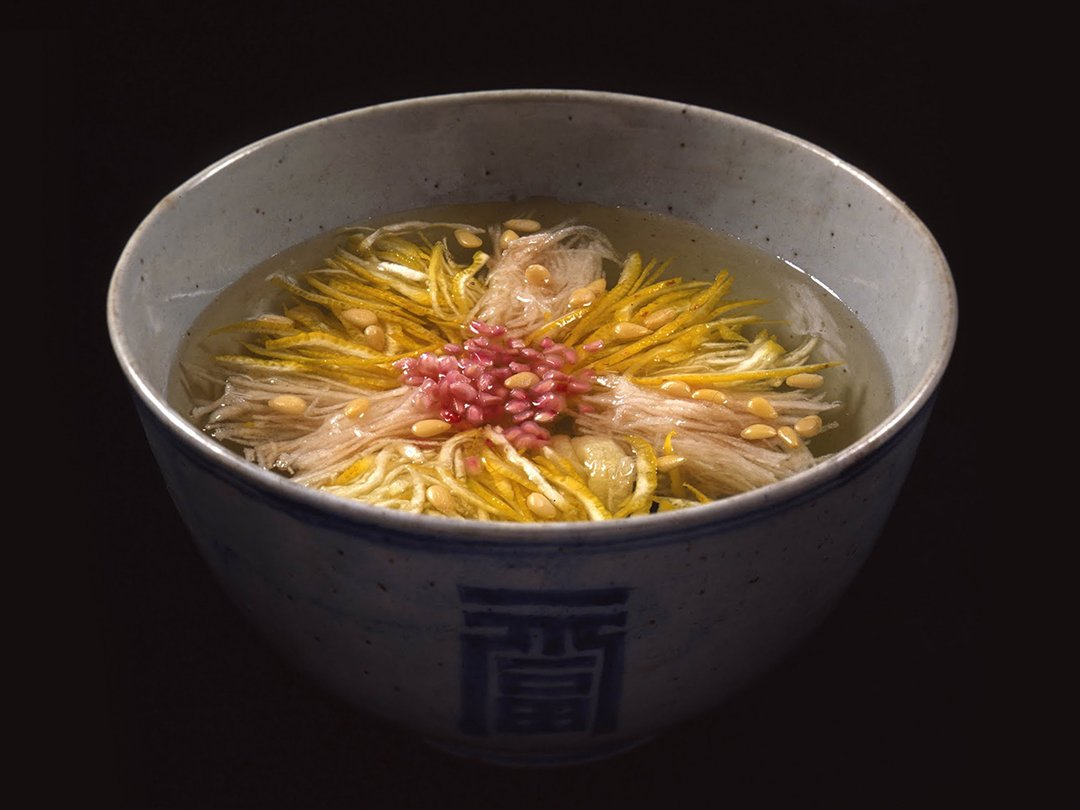
- Type: Hwachae
- Origin: Korea
- Ingredients: Yuja, Korean pear

Korean name
- Hangul: 유자화채
- Hanja: 柚子花菜
- RR: yujahwachae
- MR: yujahwach'ae
- IPA: [ju.dʑa.ɦwa.tɕʰɛ̝]

Yuja-hwachae (Korean: 유자화채; Hanja: 柚子花菜) is a variety of hwachae, Korean traditional fruit punch made with finely shredded yuja, Korean pear, and honey or sugar. In Korea, yuja are largely cultivated in the southern part of the Korean Peninsula such as Goheung and Wando, Geoje, and Namhae. Therefore, yuja hwachae has been a local specialty of the Jeolla Province and Gyeongsang Province.

== Preparation ==
One yuja is slit down into a quarter to peel off its rind to carefully keep the inner flesh intact. The peeled fruit is divided into its segments from which the endocarp, central column and seeds are taken out. Each piece of the rinds is placed on a cutting board and the zest is finely shredded after the white membrane are removed. A peeled Korean pear is thinly shredded and placed alongside the array of the zest. The yuja flesh is squeezed to produce the juice that is mixed with prepared and chilled syrup made of water and sugar.

The shredded zest and pear are arranged in a large glass bowl for hwachae by the yellow and white array. After the sugar water is poured over them, the punch is placed for about 30 minutes to allow the yuja's flavor and scent to emerge. Several pomegranate arils and pine nuts are place on the center of the yuja hwachae as garnishes. The prepared hwachae is served in a small individual bowl.

== In Korean culture ==
Yuja hwachae was often served as a part of Korean royal court cuisine during the Joseon period. It is considered not only good for thirst quenching but also known for its decoration. Yuja hwachae is traditionally drunk in autumn, and is closely related to the Korean traditional festival called Junggu (중구 重九) or Juyangjeol (중양절). It falls on every 9th day of the 9th month of the Korean calendar (lunisolar) and is said that two yang (positive cosmic forces) is overlapped on the date. It was a custom for Korea people to eat yuja hwachae along with gukhwajeon (국화전), flower pancake made with chrysanthemum and gukhwaju (국화주), rice wine made with the flower on the date.

== See also ==
- Hwajeon
- Samjitnal
- Yuja-cha
- Korean tea
- List of Korean beverages
