= Hwachae =

Korean traditional fruit or flower drinks

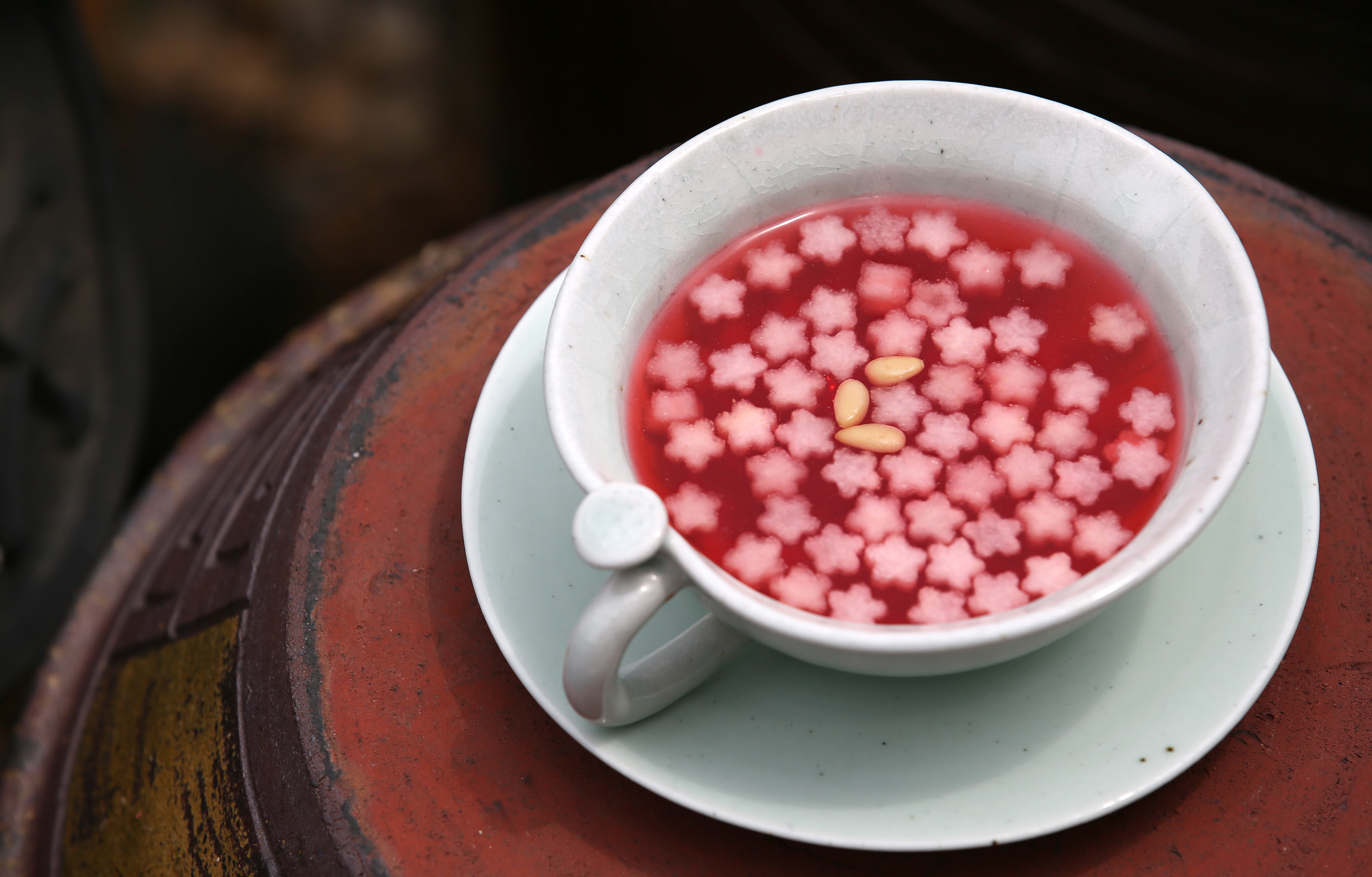
- Omija-hwachae (magnolia berry punch)
- Type: Punch
- Place of origin: Korea
- Associated cuisine: Korean cuisine
- Main ingredients: Magnolia berries, Honey
- Similar dishes: Sudan

Korean name
- Hangul: 화채
- Hanja: 花菜
- RR: hwachae
- MR: hwach'ae
- IPA: [hwa.tɕʰɛ]

Hwachae (Korean: 화채) is a general term for traditional Korean punches, made with various fruits or edible flower petals. The fruits and flowers are soaked in honeyed water or honeyed magnolia berry juice. In modern South Korea, carbonated drinks and fruit juices are also commonly added to hwachae. Hwachae is often garnished with pine nuts before it is served.

== Types ==
It is said that there are around thirty types of traditional hwachae.

=== Fruit ===
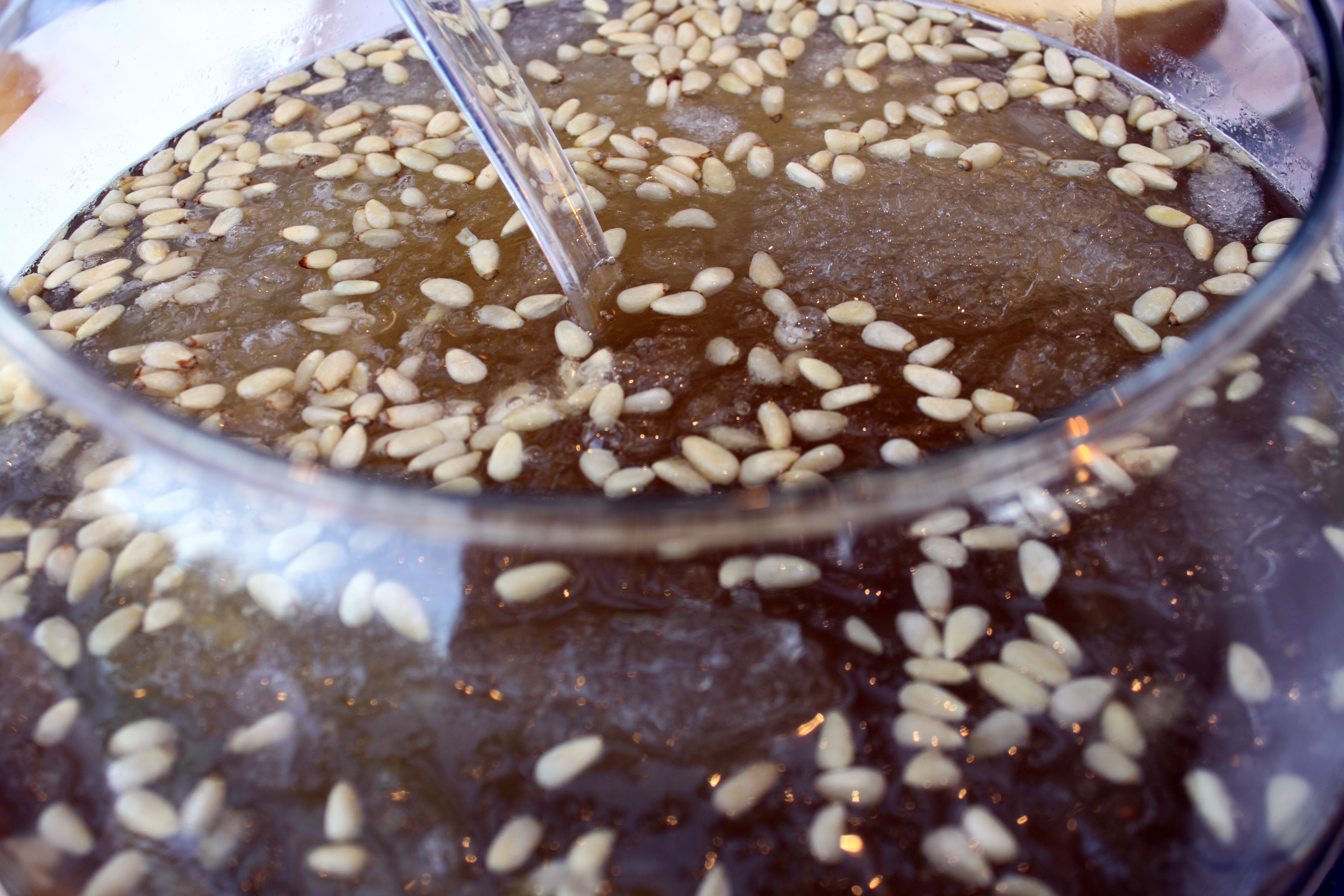
Bae-hwachae (pear punch)

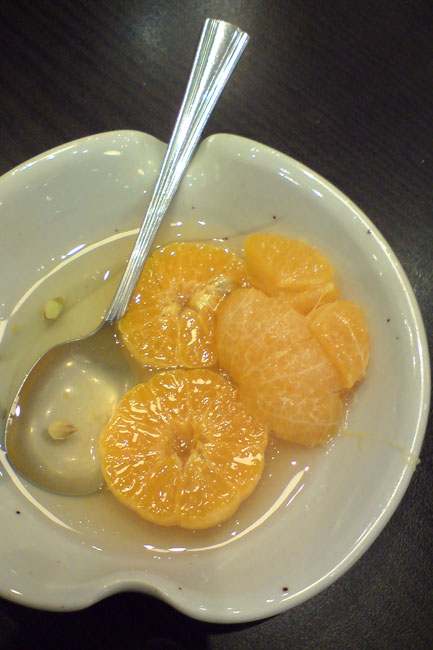
Milgam-hwachae (citrus punch)

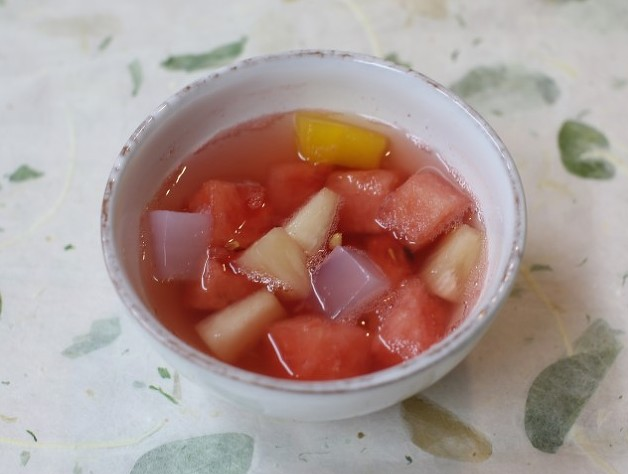
Subak-hwachae (watermelon punch)

- Aengdu-hwachae (앵두화채; lit. 'cherry punch') – made with Korean cherries and honeyed water. It is associated with Dano, the fifth day of the fifth lunar month.
- Bae-hwachae (배화채; lit. 'pear punch') – made with flower-shaped pieces of Korean pear and honeyed magnolia berry juice.
- Baesuk (배숙) – boiled pear punch.
- Boksunga-hwachae (복숭아화채; lit. 'peach punch') – made with peach preserved in honey and sugared water.
- Chamoe-hwachae (참외화채; lit. 'melon punch') – made with Korean melon slices, cherries, celery slices, and honeyed magnolia berry juice.
- Cheondoboksunga-hwachae (천도복숭아화채; lit. 'nectarine punch') – made with nectarine preserved in honey and sugared water.
- Milgam-hwachae (밀감화채; lit. 'citrus punch') – also called gyul-hwachae (귤화채); made with citrus fruit—usually summer orange— pieces, in the fruit's juice mixed with lemon juice, sugar, and water. It is a local specialty of Jeju Island, where summer oranges and most other citrus fruits are cultivated.
- Mogwa-hwachae (모과화채; lit. 'quince punch') – made with Chinese quince slices preserved with hardy mandarin slices in sugar and honeyed water, consumed after 20 days.
- Omija-hwachae (오미자화채; lit. 'magnolia berry punch') – made with honeyed magnolia berry juice and decorative slices of Korean pear.
- Podo-hwachae (포도화채; lit. 'grape punch') – made with peeled grape boiled in sugared water, cherries, and honeyed water.
- Sagwa-hwachae (사과화채; lit. 'apple punch') – made with flower-shaped pieces of apple and honeyed magnolia berry juice.
- Sansa-hwachae (산사화채; lit. 'hawthorn punch') – made with jellied mountain hawthorn, called sansa-pyeon, sliced and floated in honeyed water.
- Sanddalgi-hwachae (산딸기화채; lit. 'raspberry punch') – made with Korean raspberries and honeyed water. It is associated with Yudu, the fifteenth day of the sixth lunar month.
- Subak-hwachae (수박화채; lit. 'watermelon punch') – made with scooped or sliced watermelon pieces, bits of other fruits, ice cubes, and honeyed watermelon juice. It is a popular summertime refreshment.
- Ddalgi-hwachae (딸기화채; lit. 'strawberry punch') – made with strawberries.
- Yuja-hwachae (유자화채; lit. 'yuja punch') – made with yuja and Korean pear, both thinly julienned, and pomegranate and honeyed water.

=== Flower ===
Flower petals are coated with mung bean starch and blanched, cooled in ice water, and drained before being put in hwachae. Flower hwachae is usually topped with pine nuts.

- Jangmi-hwachae (장미화채; lit. 'rose punch') – made with rose petals and honeyed magnolia berry juice.
- Jindallae-hwachae (진달래화채; lit. 'rhododendron punch') – made with Korean rhododendron petals and honeyed magnolia berry juice. It is associated with Samjinnal, the third day of the third lunar month.
- Songhwa-hwachae (송화화채; lit. 'pine pollen punch') – also called songhwa-su (송화수) or songhwa-milsu (송화밀수); made with dried pollen of Korean red pine and honeyed water. It is a local specialty of Gangwon Province.
- Songhwa-milsu (송화밀수) – traditional drink made of pine flower pollen (songhwa) and honey.
- Sunchae-hwachae (순채화채; lit. 'water-shield punch') – made with water-shield leaves and honeyed water or honeyed magnolia berry juice.

=== Noodle ===
- Changmyeon (창면; lit. 'smooth noodle') – cool dessert for summer, consisting of noodles made with mung bean starch and omija juice.
- Hwamyeon (화면; lit. 'flower noodle') – cool noodle soup almost similar to changmyeon except the addition of edible flower petals.

=== Grain ===
- Sudan – (수단) – grain cake punch.
