= Subak-hwachae =

Korean watermelon punch

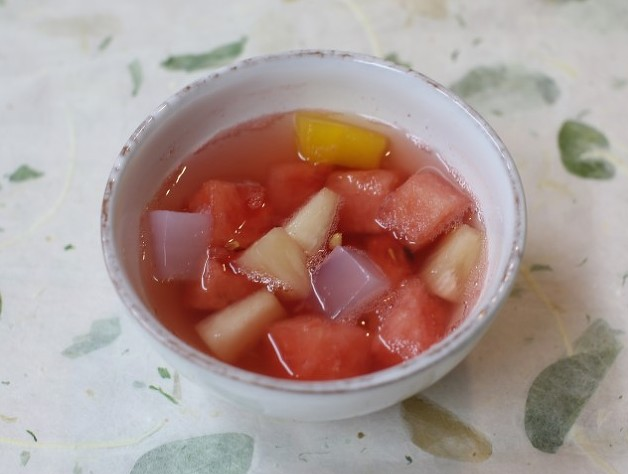
- Type: Hwachae
- Place of origin: Korea
- Associated cuisine: Korean cuisine
- Main ingredients: Watermelon

Korean name
- Hangul: 수박화채
- Hanja: 수박花菜
- RR: subakhwachae
- MR: subakhwach'ae
- IPA: [su.ba.kʰwa.tɕʰɛ]

Subak-hwachae (Korean: 수박화채) or watermelon punch is a variety of hwachae (traditional Korean punch) in which watermelon is a primary ingredient. It is widely consumed during summer throughout Korea to keep cool in hot temperatures.

== Preparation ==
Watermelon is cut in half, and the interior flesh is either scooped out using a melon baller or cut into small pieces with a knife. Then, the seeds are removed. The hollowed watermelon rind may be cut decoratively and used as the serving bowl for the finished hwachae. Watermelon juice, sweeteners like sugar and honey and sometimes water is also added to the punch. To complete the preparation, scooped or sliced watermelon pieces, bits of other fruits, and ice cubes are put in the bowl. Occasionally, soju is thrown in the mix as well for an alcoholic punch.

== See also ==
- Omija-hwachae
- List of Korean beverages
- List of melon dishes
