= Penicillium daejeonium =

Scientific classification
- Domain: Eukaryota
- Kingdom: Fungi
- Division: Ascomycota
- Class: Eurotiomycetes
- Order: Eurotiales
- Family: Aspergillaceae
- Genus: Penicillium
- Species: P. daejeonium

Binomial name
- Penicillium daejeonium S.H. Yu & H.K. Sang 2013

Species of fungus

Penicillium daejeonium is a species of the genus of Penicillium which was isolated from grape and schisandra fruit in Korea.

== See also ==
- List of Penicillium species
