= Baesuk =

Korean pear fruit punch

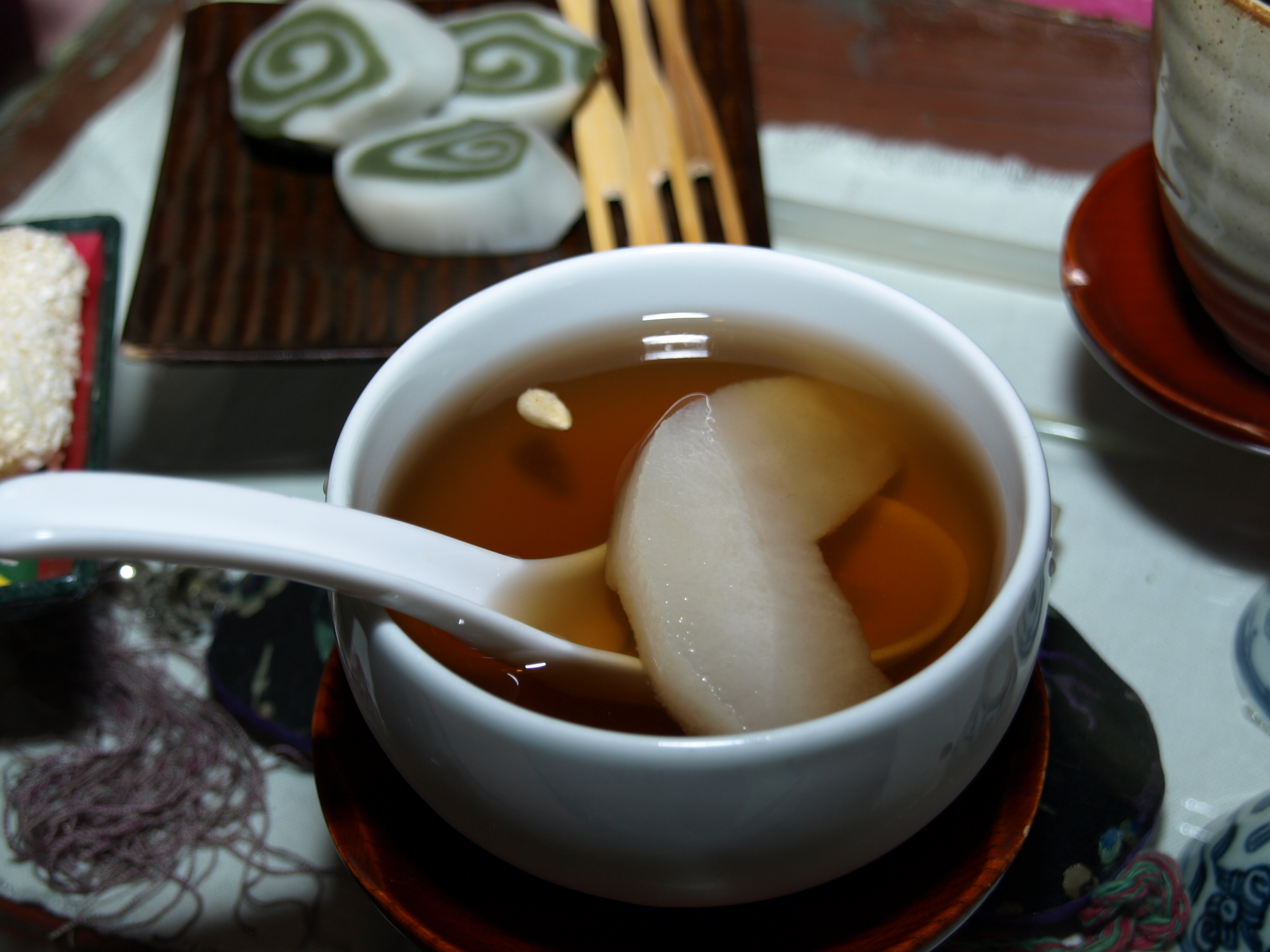
- Baesuk being served with a variety of tteok, Korean rice cake

Korean name
- Hangul: 배숙; 이숙
- Hanja: 배熟; 梨熟
- RR: baesuk; isuk
- MR: paesuk; isuk

Baesuk (Korean: 배숙; pronounced [pɛ.suk]) is a variety of hwachae, Korean traditional fruit punch made with bae (배: Korean pear), black peppercorns, ginger, honey or sugar, and water.

== History ==
Originally, baesuk was served in Korean royal court cuisine, so that it was not spread to the public until the mid-20th century. Baesuk is also called isuk, and both terms literally mean "cooked pear" in Korean. A peeled pear is cut into several pieces easily to be eaten or prepared as a whole and then generally three black peppercorns are stuck onto the surface of each piece. In case of cooking Korean pear a whole pear without slicing, it is called hyangseolgo (향설고, 香雪膏) and sour and hard munbae (문배, Pyrus ussuriensis var.seoulensis) is used.

== Recipe ==
The pieces are poached by simmering with sliced ginger and sugar or honey over low heat until tender. After removing from the heat, gingers are discarded and the mixture is chilled in a cold place. The baesuk is poured into a glass bowl for hwachae and is garnished with ground pine nuts. It can be served with a dash of yujajeub (유자즙, yuzu juice) mixed together. Baesuk is a seasonal food usually drunken cold just like other hwachae varieties but can be served hot.

Baesuk is usually prepared and drunk in the summer or for Chuseok (Korean Mid-Autumn Festival).

Together with sujeonggwa (persimmon punch), baesuk is considered a representative Korean beverage. Due to the similar recipes of the two beverages, baesuk is sometimes called "baesujeonggwa" (배수정과). Baesuk is usually served as dessert and also considered a good remedy for the common cold. The beverage is widely popular in South Korea because of the moderate sweet flavor and easy recipe.

== See also ==
- Sujeonggwa
- Sikhye
- List of Korean beverages
- Korean tea
