= Sudan (food) =

Korean traditional punch

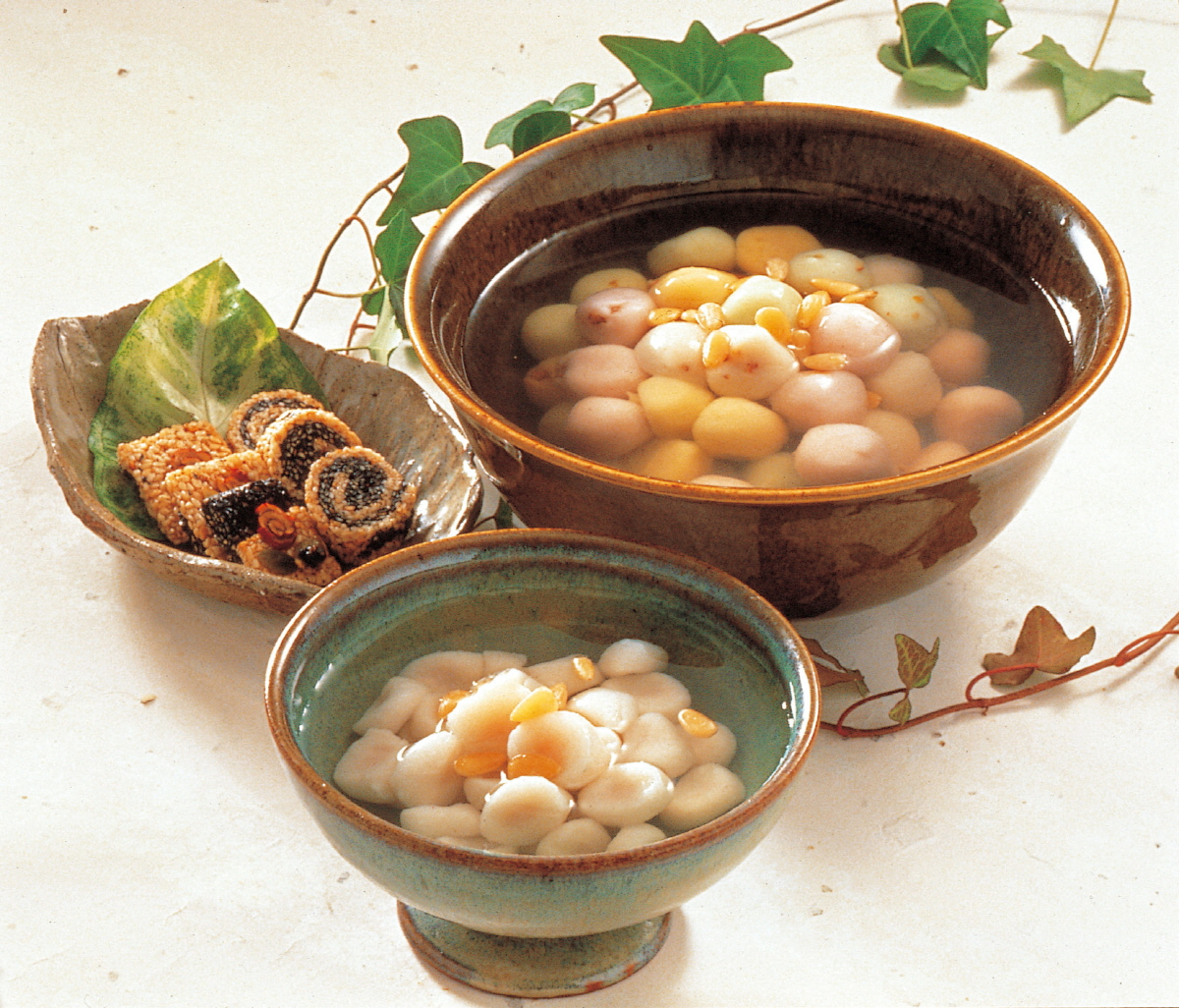
- Type: Punch
- Place of origin: Korea
- Associated cuisine: Korean cuisine
- Similar dishes: Hwachae

Korean name
- Hangul: 수단
- Hanja: 水團; 水𩜵
- RR: sudan
- MR: sudan
- IPA: [su.dan]

Sudan (Korean: 수단; Hanja: 水團; 水𩜵) is a traditional Korean punch made with boiled grain cake balls and honeyed water. It is usually served during the summer for quenching thirst. Traditionally Sudan was always served during a village rite in the 6th month of the Korean calendar (lunisolar). Korean farmers prayed for a bountiful harvest and god's blessing for their life in the future by making food offering including foods and Sudan drink. It is sometimes considered a type of hwachae.

Hwachae made with rice (or other grain) cakes or rice (or other grain) balls are called sudan (수단).

- Bori-sudan (보리수단; "barley punch") – made with steamed barley, mung bean starch, and omija juice.
- Tteok-sudan (떡수단; "rice cake punch") – made with thinly sliced garaetteok (tubular rice cake), mung bean starch, and honey.
- Wonso-byeong (원소병; "rice ball punch") – made with ball-shaped tteok with fillings of minced jujube or citrus jam floated in honeyed juice.

== See also ==
- Baesuk – boiled pear punch
- Hwachae
- Hwachae – fruit or flower punch
- Shikhye
- Sikhye – rice punch
- Sujeonggwa – cinnamon punch
