= C22H30O6 =

The molecular formula C_{22}H_{30}O_{6} (molar mass: 390.47 g/mol, exact mass: 390.2042 u) may refer to:

- Megaphone (molecule)
- Pregomisin
- Prostratin
