= List of Korean drinks =

This list of Korean drinks includes drinks, traditional or modern, which are distinctive to or closely identified with Korea. Brands and companies are South Korean unless noted.

== Alcoholic drinks ==
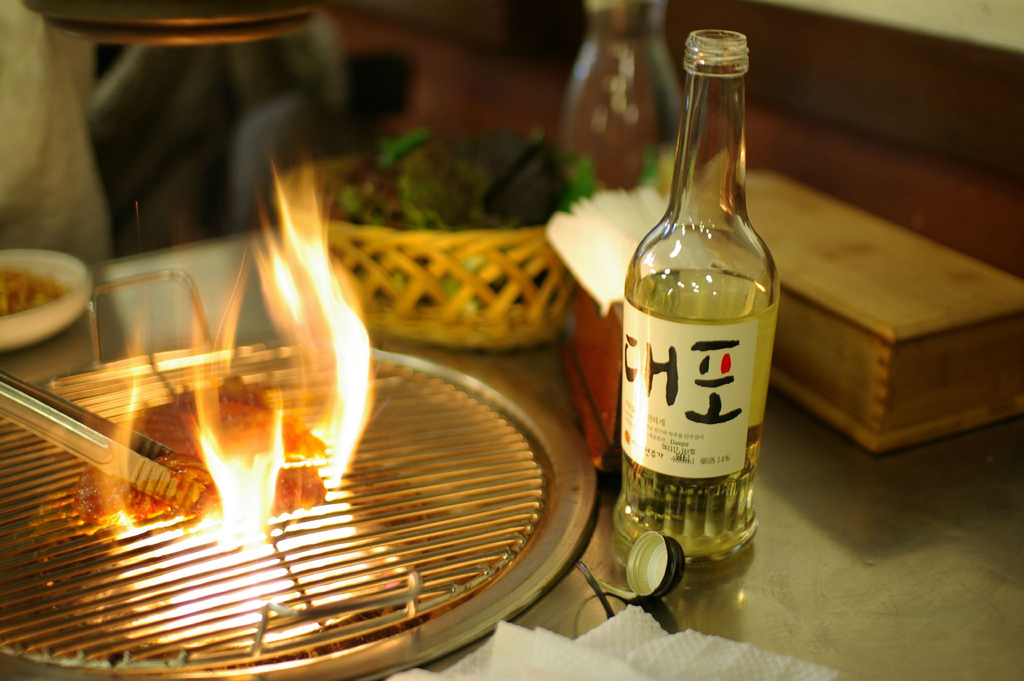
Daepo, a branded yakju

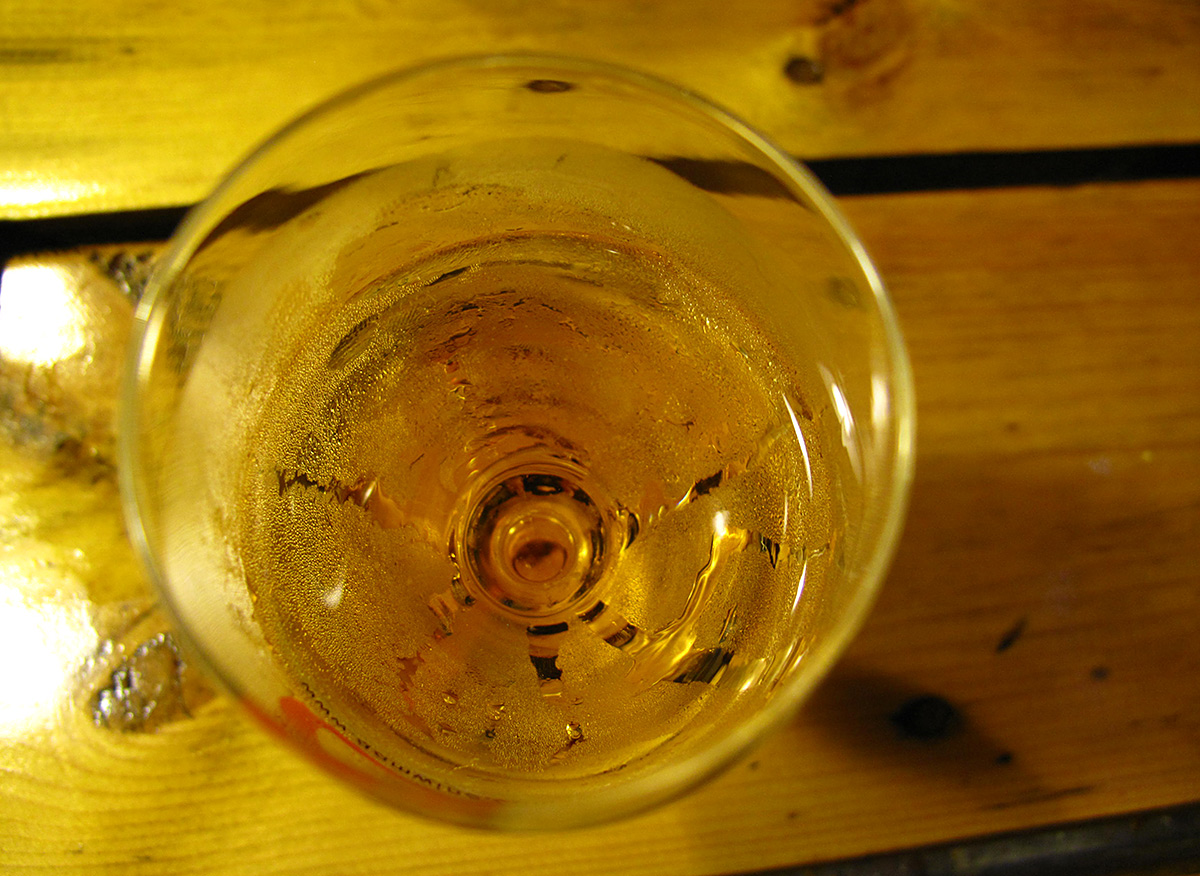
Persimmon wine from Daegu

- Baekseju
- Beolddeokju, herbal rice wine believed to increase male stamina; bottles are often sold topped with a ceramic penis
- Cheongju, rice wine
  - Sogokju
  - Beopju, a traditional liquor of Gyeongju
- Dugyeonju
- Gyepiju
- Insamju, medicinal wine; made from ginseng
- Makgeolli wine from rice and fermentation starter nuruk
- Munbaeju
- Persimmon wine, produced in the wine tunnel south of Daegu
- Soju, sweet potato or rice liquor
  - Jinro, a brand of soju
- Yakju
  - Takju, also known as makgeolli
    - Dongdongju
- Ttongsul

=== Beers ===
- Hite, other products include Black Beer Stout
- Oriental Brewery, brands include OB and Cass
- Taedonggang, a North Korean beer resembling ale; produced since 2002

== Non-alcoholic drinks ==
=== Traditional ===
All Korean traditional non-alcoholic drinks are referred to as "eumcheongnyu" (음청류 飮淸類). According to historical documents regarding Korean cuisine, almost 200 items of eumcheongnyu are found. Eumcheongnyu can be divided into the categories of cha (차 tea), tang (탕 boiled water), jang (장 fermented grain juice with sour taste), suksu (숙수), galsu (갈수 thirst water), hwachae (화채 fruit punch), sikhye (식혜 sweet rice drink), sujeonggwa (수정과 persimmon drink), milsu or kkulmul (밀수, 꿀물 honeyed water), jeup (즙 juice) and milk by their ingredient materials and preparation methods. Among the eumcheongnyu, cha, hwachae, sikhye, and sujeonggwa are still widely favored and consumed; however, tang, jang, suksu, and galsu have almost disappeared in the present.

==== Teas ====
A more extensive list can be found in: Korean tea, See also: Korean tea ceremony

- Boricha, made from barley
- Green tea (녹차 [nokcha]), a staple of tea culture across East Asia
- Oksusu cha, made from boiled roasted corn kernels
- Sungnyung made from boiled toasted rice
- Yulmu cha, made from the yulmu (Coix lacryma-jobi var. ma-yuen) grains

==== Hwachae ====
- Hwachae is a group of Korean traditional drinks made with fruits, flower petals, and honey, or sugar.

==== Others ====
- Ogamcha, a drink with alder, licorice, chaga and ginseng
- Shikhye, a malt drink
- Solhinun, a pine bud drink made by Lotte
- Sujeonggwa, a persimmon and cinnamon drink

=== Modern ===
- 2% fruit flavored water; peach, lemon, apple, grape and pomegranate
- 815 Cola (discontinued and relaunched in 2014)
- Achimhaetsal, rice milk
- Bacchus-F
- Banana Flavored Milk
- Chilsung Cider, a clear carbonated sugar soda (not lemon-lime like Sprite)
- Duyu, soymilk
- McCol, a barley-made cola
- Milkis, a creamy soda
- Sac Sac, a Mandarin orange-flavored drink (not pure juice) with bits of pulp, found in small aluminum cans with a peel-off tab
- Vita 500, an energy drink launched in 2001

== See also ==
- Korean cuisine
- List of Korean dishes
- List of Korean desserts
- List of North Korean dishes
