= Omija-hwachae =

Korean magnolia berry punch

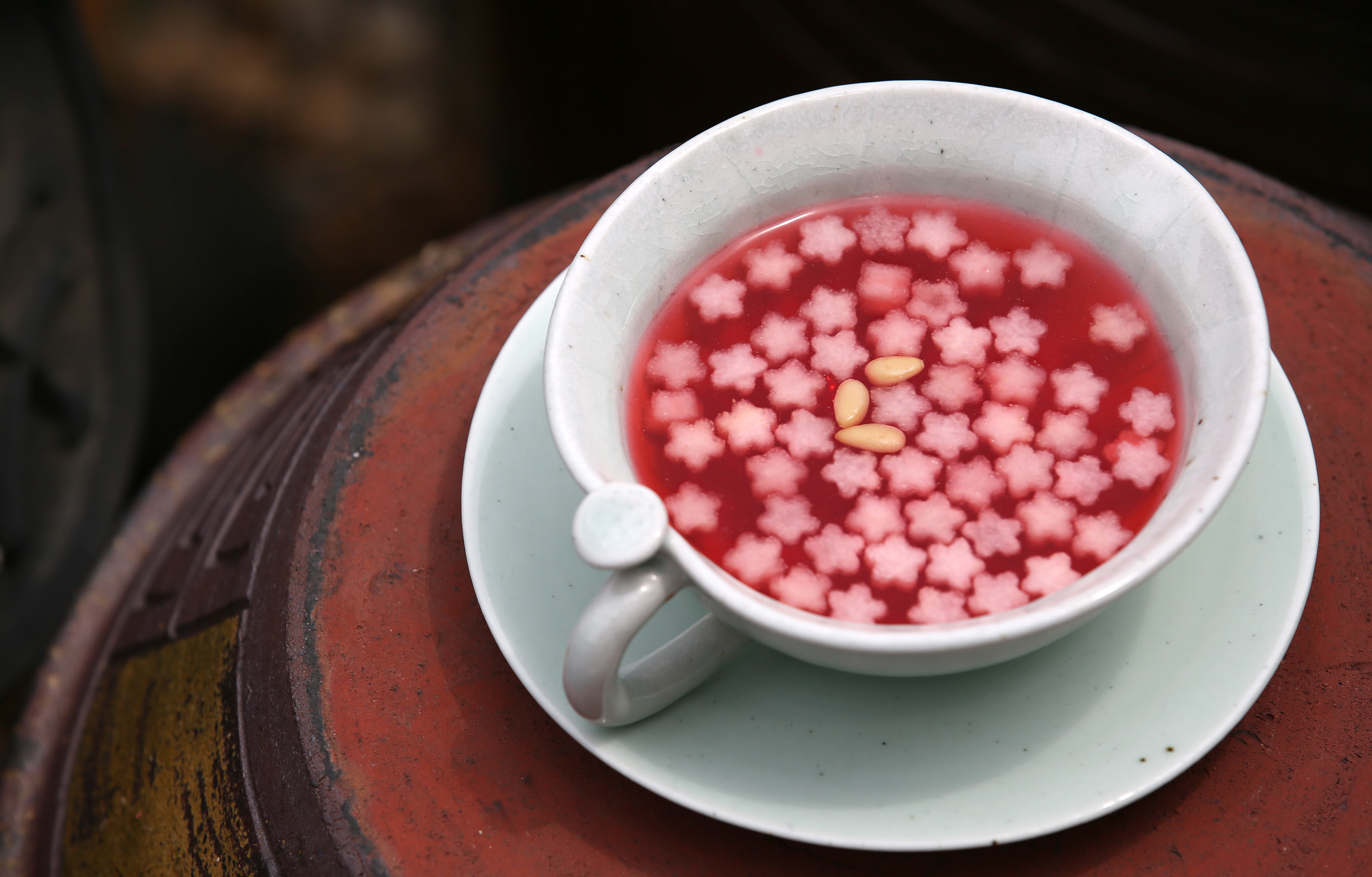
- Type: Hwachae
- Place of origin: Korea
- Associated cuisine: Korean cuisine
- Serving temperature: 4–10 °C (39–50 °F)
- Main ingredients: Magnolia berries
- Food energy (per 1 serving): 17.5 kcal (73 kJ)

Korean name
- Hangul: 오미자화채
- Hanja: 五味子花菜
- RR: omijahwachae
- MR: omijahwach'ae
- IPA: [o.mi.dʑa.ɦwa.tɕʰɛ]

Omija-hwachae (Korean: 오미자화채; Hanja: 五味子花菜) or magnolia berry punch is a sweet and tangy hwachae (punch) made with magnolia berries—omija in Korean. The reddish-pink punch is typically served during hot summer days.

== Preparation ==
The base is made by infusing dried magnolia berries in water until the color develops, sieving the liquid through a fine cloth, then sweetening with honey, sugar or syrup. It is served with decorative slices of Asian pear and pine nuts floating at the top.

== See also ==
- Omija-cha – magnolia berry tea
