= Songhwa-milsu =

Korean traditional drink

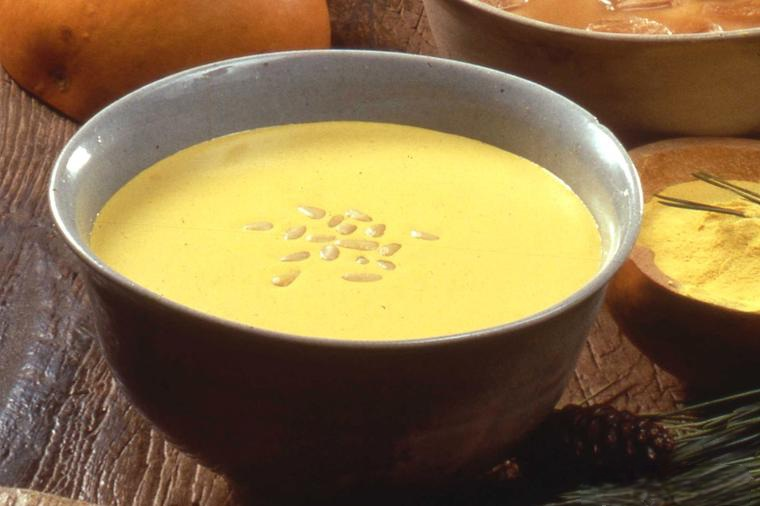

Korean name
- Hangul: 송화밀수
- Hanja: 松花蜜水
- RR: songhwamilsu
- MR: songhwamilsu

Songhwa milsu (Korean: 송화밀수) is a kind of Korean traditional drink made of pine flower pollen (songhwa) and honey. It is said beneficial for relieving thirst caused by the heat of summer. It also made as an effective remedy for relieving respiratory ailments, neuralgia and headaches.

== See also ==
- Shikhye
- Hwachae
- Yoon Sook-ja
