= Schisandrin =

Names
- IUPAC name 3,4,5,14,15,16-hexamethoxy-9,10-dimethyltricyclo[10.4.0.0^{2,7}]hexadeca-1(16),2,4,6,12,14-hexaen-9-ol

Identifiers
CAS Number	7432-28-2
3D model (JSmol)	Interactive image
PubChem CID	23915
CompTox Dashboard (EPA)	DTXSID20995843
- InChI: InChI=1S/C24H32O7/c1-13-9-14-10-16(26-3)20(28-5)22(30-7)18(14)19-15(12-24(13,2)25)11-17(27-4)21(29-6)23(19)31-8/h10-11,13,25H,9,12H2,1-8H3/t13-,24-/m0/s1 Key: YEFOAORQXAOVJQ-RZFZLAGVSA-N
- SMILES: CC1Cc2cc(c(c(c2-c3c(cc(c(c3OC)OC)OC)CC1(C)O)OC)OC)OC

Properties
Chemical formula	C₂₄H₃₂O₇
Molar mass	432.5 g/mol
Appearance	White powder
Density	1.135±0.06 g/cm³
Melting point	130 °C
Boiling point	576.659±50.00 °C
- Except where otherwise noted, data are given for materials in their standard state (at 25 °C [77 °F], 100 kPa). Infobox references

Schisandrins (schizandrins) are a group of bioactive chemical compounds found in Schisandra rubriflora, Schisandra sphenanthera, and Schisandra chinensis. Schizandrin is a lignan.

== Characteristics ==
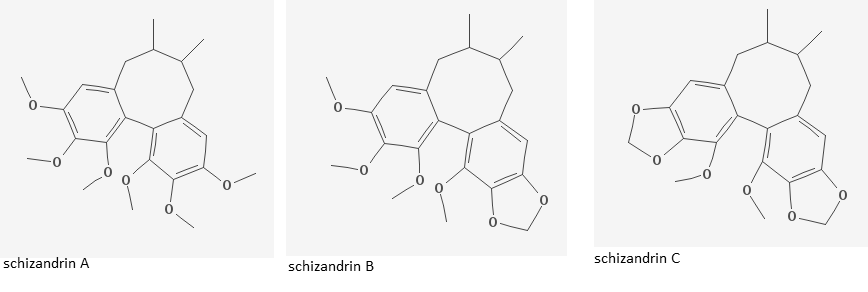
Chemical structures of schisandrins A-C

Schisandra chinensis (S. chinensis) berries were originally a component of traditional herbal medicine in China, Korea, and other east Asian countries.

Examples include:

- Schisandrin A
- Schisandrin B (γ-schisandrin)
- Schisandrin C
