= Gomisin A =

Names
- Preferred IUPAC name (6S,7S)-1,2,3,13-Tetramethoxy-6,7-dimethyl-5,6,7,8-tetrahydro-11H-benzo[3,4]cycloocta[1,2-f][1,3]benzodioxol-6-ol
- Other names Besigomsin; Schisandrol B; Schizandrol B

Identifiers
CAS Number	58546-54-6
3D model (JSmol)	Interactive image
ChEMBL	ChEMBL403578
ChemSpider	2272987
PubChem CID	3001662
UNII	L5U70J87J8
CompTox Dashboard (EPA)	DTXSID7048950
- InChI: InChI=1S/C23H28O7/c1-12-7-13-8-16-20(30-11-29-16)22(28-6)17(13)18-14(10-23(12,2)24)9-15(25-3)19(26-4)21(18)27-5/h8-9,12,24H,7,10-11H2,1-6H3/t12-,23-/m0/s1 Key: ZWRRJEICIPUPHZ-MYODQAERSA-N
- SMILES: C[C@H]1CC2=CC3=C(C(=C2C4=C(C(=C(C=C4C[C@]1(C)O)OC)OC)OC)OC)OCO3

Properties
Chemical formula	C_{23}H_{28}O_{7}
Molar mass	416.470 g·mol^{−1}
- Except where otherwise noted, data are given for materials in their standard state (at 25 °C [77 °F], 100 kPa). Infobox references

Gomisin A is a bio-active compound isolated from Schisandra chinensis.
