= Pregomisin =

Names
- IUPAC name (8R,8′S)-4,4′,5,5′-Tetramethoxylignane-3,3′-diol
- Systematic IUPAC name 3,3′-[(2R,3S)-2,3-Dimethylbutane-1,4-diyl]bis(5,6-dimethoxyphenol)

Identifiers
CAS Number	66280-26-0
3D model (JSmol)	Interactive image
ChemSpider	158122
PubChem CID	181796
UNII	5AYW92EXLG
- InChI: InChI=1S/C22H30O6/c1-13(7-15-9-17(23)21(27-5)19(11-15)25-3)14(2)8-16-10-18(24)22(28-6)20(12-16)26-4/h9-14,23-24H,7-8H2,1-6H3/t13-,14+ Key: RLRKIWSBYUZHIJ-OKILXGFUSA-N; InChI=1/C22H30O6/c1-13(7-15-9-17(23)21(27-5)19(11-15)25-3)14(2)8-16-10-18(24)22(28-6)20(12-16)26-4/h9-14,23-24H,7-8H2,1-6H3/t13-,14+ Key: RLRKIWSBYUZHIJ-OKILXGFUBC
- SMILES: C[C@H](Cc1cc(c(c(c1)OC)OC)O)[C@@H](C)Cc2cc(c(c(c2)OC)OC)O

Properties
Chemical formula	C_{22}H_{30}O_{6}
Molar mass	390.476 g·mol^{−1}
- Except where otherwise noted, data are given for materials in their standard state (at 25 °C [77 °F], 100 kPa). Infobox references

Pregomisin is a chemical compound isolated from Schisandra chinensis.
