= McCol =

South Korean barley soft drink

McCol (Korean: 맥콜, from 麥 + cola) is a South Korean soft drink with a barley flavor. It is produced by Ilhwa, a subsidiary of the Tongil Group. It is known for its longevity and high vitamin C content. It comes in cans of 160, 190, 250, and 355mL, and in bottles of 0.5 and 1.5L.

== Recipe ==
McCol, or at least its initial formulation, uses malt for its flavor. The malt is baked and made into an extract, after which it is filtered and carbonated. The dextrin, maltose, and glucose of the malt as well as added sugar contribute to the drink's sweet taste.

== History ==
In the late 1970s, South Korea's booming economy led to a surplus of barley as popular diet shifted. Aiming to preserve the price of barley for farmers, the Korea Agro-Fisheries and Food Trade Corporation (농어촌개발공사, now 농수산식품유통공사) sought to develop new ways to consume barley, leading it to conceive of McCol in 1979. After pitching the idea to multiple producers, only Ilhwa agreed to produce the drink. McCol first entered the market on July 21, 1982 with an initial batch of 50,000 cans but faced stiff competition from Coca-Cola and Chilsung Cider. In response, McCol underwent an intensive marketing campaign, promoting itself since 1984 as a healthy drink. From January to October 1987, Ilhwa spent 40,000,000,000 South Korean won on marketing alone, nearly triple of that of Coca-Cola at the time. Aiming for the youth market, 80% of that budget was spent on TV adverts featuring celebrities like Cho Yong-pil. McCol rose from a market share of 5.6% in 1986 to 14–15% in 1987, and began earning around ₩9 billion annually. McCol soon released containers of 200mL, 340mL, and 640mL. In the 1990s, the drink was discontinued after being outcompeted by other brands. However, after a positive consumer taste survey, it was rebooted in early 2000s.

McCol Zero, a low-sugar and calorie variant, was launched in February 2023, following the zero-sugar industry trend. By September 2024, over 15 million cans were sold, and by 2025, 6.4 billion cans had been sold. In recent years, Ilhwa is seeking to expand McCol internationally, exporting the drink to the US, Japan, Russia, Australia, and others. Additionally, Ilhwa signed contracts in South Africa in 2023 and Mongolia in 2024. In July 2018, Ilhwa suspended sales of McCol in Japan after multiple cans exploded.

Some Christians boycott the drink as they view the Unification Church, which is affiliated with the Tongil Group, as heretical.

== See also ==
- Baikal (drink)
- Cockta
