= Omija-cha =

Korean tea made from magnolia berries

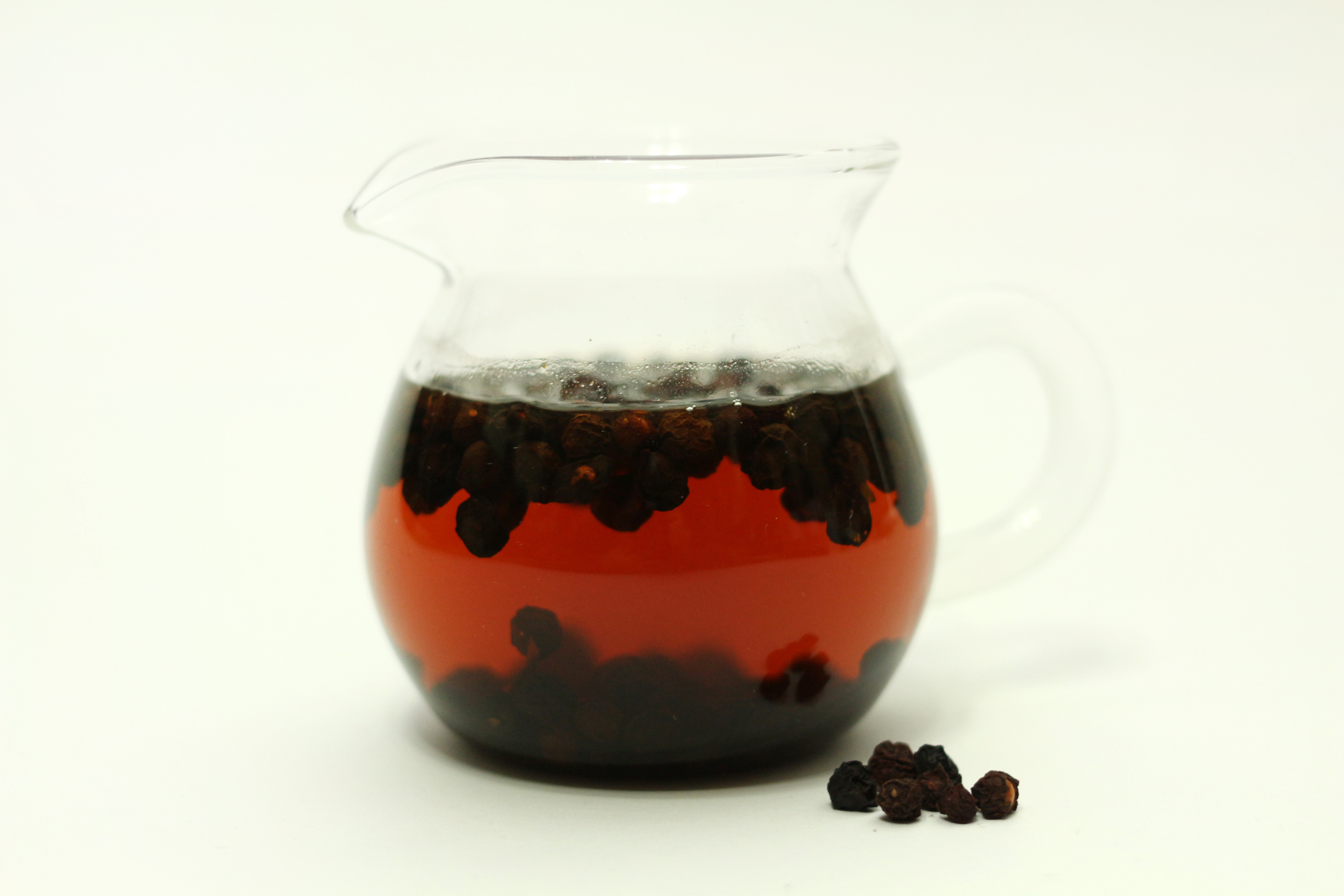
- Type: Herbal tea
- Origin: Korea
- Ingredients: Schisandra chinensis berries

Korean name
- Hangul: 오미자차
- Hanja: 五味子茶
- RR: omijacha
- MR: omijach'a
- IPA: [o.mi.dʑa.tɕʰa]

Omija-cha (Korean: 오미자차) or magnolia berry tea is a traditional Korean tea made from dried Schisandra berries—omija in Korean. Omija means "five flavors", which are sweetness, sourness, bitterness, saltiness, and pungency. The tea can be made by boiling dried magnolia berries in water on low heat, then adding honey. Alternatively, ground magnolia berry seeds can be added to cold water to make the tea.

Omija-cha, served either hot or cold, is also used to make omija-hwachae (magnolia berry punch).

Omija-cha is often served as traditional medicine, as it is said to improve blood circulation and kidney function, among others.
