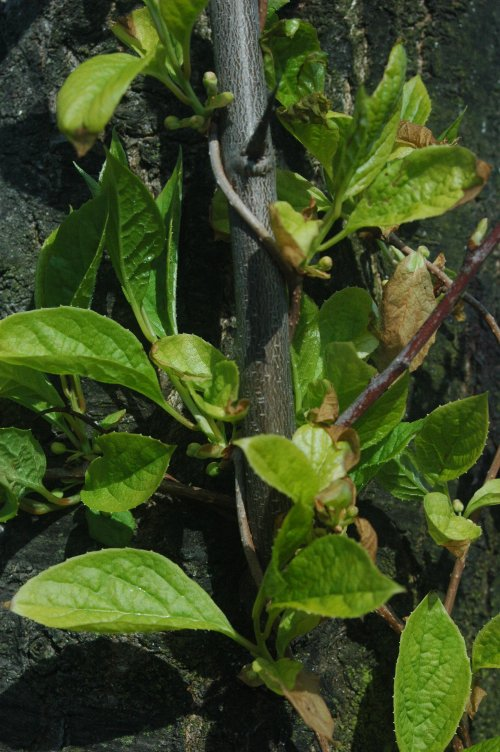

Scientific classification
- Kingdom: Plantae
- Clade: Tracheophytes
- Clade: Angiosperms
- Order: Austrobaileyales
- Family: Schisandraceae
- Genus: Schisandra
- Species: S. chinensis

Binomial name
- Schisandra chinensis (Turcz.) Baill.

Synonyms
- Kadsura chinensis Turcz. Maximowiczia amurensis Rupr. Maximowiczia chinensis (Turcz.) Rupr. Maximowiczia japonica (A.Gray) K.Koch; Schisandra chinensis var. leucocarpa P.H.Huang & L.H.Zhuo; Schisandra nigra f. viridicarpa (Y.N.Lee) M.Kim; Schisandra repanda f. viridicarpa (Y.N.Lee) M.Kim; Schisandra japonica (Siebold. & Zucc. ex A. Gray) Hance. Sphaerostema japonicum A.Gray

= Schisandra chinensis =

Species of flowering plant

Schisandra chinensis, whose fruit is called schisandra, magnolia berry or five-flavor fruit, is a vine plant native to forests of Northern China, the Russian Far East, Korea, and Japan. It is hardy in USDA Zones 4-8. The fruits are red berries in dense clusters around 10 centimetres (3.9 in) long.

== Names ==
The berry is commonly known as "five-flavor berry." In Mandarin it is called wǔwèizi (五味子; 'five-flavor berry'); in Korean, omija (Hangul: 오미자). These names refer to the idea that the berry possesses all five of the basic flavors: bitter, sweet, sour, salty and pungent.

Sometimes it is more specifically called běi wǔwèizi (北五味子; 'northern five-flavor berry') to distinguish it from another schisandraceous plant, Kadsura japonica, that grows only in subtropical areas. Another species of schisandra berry, Schisandra sphenanthera, has a similar but different biochemical profile. The Chinese Pharmacopeia (2015) distinguishes between S. chinensis and S. sphenanthera (南五味子; nán wǔwèizi; 'southern five-flavor berry').

== Taxonomy ==
The genus Schisandra was first published by André Michaux in 1803, the name deriving from the Greek words schizein ('to split') and andros ('man'), referring to the separate anther cells on the stamens.

In the 21st century, Schisandra chinensis belongs to the family of Schisandraceae. In earlier years, it was assumed that the species belonged to the family of Magnoliaceae, hence the name Chinese magnolia-vine. However, many differences in plant phenology between Schisandra and members of Magnoliaceae led to the formation of Schisandraceae.

== Description ==
=== Vegetative plant organs ===
Schisandra chinensis is a perennial, deciduous woody vine plant found at high latitudes and in cool climatic conditions. It commonly grows in natural coniferous or mixed forests or along streams and climbs up other trees or shrubs to reach optimal light conditions. The prostrate woody stems usually grow 8–9 metres (26–30 ft) tall, but can reach a length of up to 25m. They are dark brown in colour and can reach 1.5–2 cm in thickness.

New shoots are typically short, but they continue their growth after flowering until late in the season. The leaves are simple, oval-shaped (5–11 cm long and 3–7 cm wide) and alternating and the petioles have a slight red colouring. Multicellular trichomes are located on the abaxial leaf lamina. Stomata show an irregular, random distribution.

The roots of Schisandra chinensis are branched and stay close to the soil surface. Nodes located on the stems can also produce roots.

=== Generative plant organs ===
This species is typically dioecious, and therefore not self-fertile, as flowers on a female plant will only produce fruit when fertilized with pollen from a male plant. However, a hybrid selection titled 'Eastern Prince' has perfect flowers and is self-fertile. Seedlings of 'Eastern Prince' are sometimes sold under the same name, but are typically single-sex plants.

The female flowers are white or cream-coloured and turn slightly reddish to the end of the flowering season. They have 5–12 waxy, spirally arranged tepals forming the perianth and 12–120 pistils. The tepals show a transition in colour from green for the outer tepals to more pigmentation for the inner ones. The flowers typically grow out of the leaf axils in clusters, later forming grape clusters with berries, but can also be found solitary. The male flower has 5 stamens with filaments of different lengths The flowers of S. chinensis are important for various pollinators such as bees, beetles and small moths. The fruits of Schisandra chinensis are red berries which are smooth and shiny, have a spherical shape and reach 5–10 mm in diameter. They grow in dense hanging clusters of 2–5 berries which reach a length of about 6–8 cm. Each berry usually contains 1–2 brownish yellow kidney-shaped seeds. The seeds have the capacity to stay dormant and to form seed banks. Distribution of seeds mainly occurs through birds.

== Climate and soil requirements ==
Wild plants of Schisandra chinensis mostly grow in mixed forests, valleys and open forest spaces. The plant can grow in wet environments and tolerates cold temperatures to −30 °C. Its optimal growing temperature is at 20–25 °C. Schisandra grows in acidic (pH of 6.5 – 6.8), deep and loose sandy loam soils. Furthermore, Schisandra cannot withstand dense and compact soils and prefers soils rich in humus. The plant grows in shade with moist, well-drained soil.

== Cultivation ==
Schisandra is native to northern and northeastern China (Manchuria). Major cultivation of Schisandra is located in Korea and China. The production however declined continuously due to the increased deforestation in Asia. Schisandra can be integrated in agroforestry farming systems as it climbs up trees to get better light conditions. On a large-scale production Schisandra plants are grown similar to grape vines and are tied up on stakes in vertical columns. Therefore, cultivation requirements are thought to be similar to those of grapes.

The species itself is dioecious, requiring flowers of a female plant to be fertilized with pollen from a male plant. A hybrid selection titled 'Eastern Prince' has flowers and is self-fertile (monoecious). Seedlings of 'Eastern Prince' are sometimes sold under the same name, but are typically single-sex plants. Another monoecious cultivar mainly planted in China is "Hong-zhen-zhu". This cultivar is next to "Bai Wu-wei-zi", "Chang-bai-hong", and "Da-chuan-hong" one of the main cultivars in China used for germplasm resources.

Plants can be propagated by seed or by layering in spring or autumn, or in the summer time by using semi-ripe cuttings. Schisandra seeds are planted in early May (the seasons mentioned in here refer to China), sprout after 15–20 days and the plants grow until late September. The seeds are sown at a density of 30 g/m^{2} and are then covered with fine soil and straw, pine needles or a grass mat. Alternatively, the seeds can be cultivated in pots and then transplanted to the field. The soil should be kept humid for the seeds to soak up with water. Three years after sowing, the plants will blossom for the first time. Normally, the plants start flowering from middle or late May to early June. As the flowers are prone to frost damage, they are best grown in areas where the chances for frost in May and June are low. Starting from June to July the fruits develop and ripen from August to September. In spring, summer or fall pruning of Schisandra vines is necessary to improve ventilation and light conditions, ensure an endogenous nutrition status and increase the number of female flowers and thus overall fruit yield. Furthermore, sprouting tillers that compete for nutrition with the main Schisandra vine should be cut away.

=== Fertilization ===
For the cultivation of young Schisandra plants a nutrient rich soil is required, wherefore mostly manure is applied as organic fertilizer. Organic high-N and high-H fertilizer should be applied at the embryonic stage and later on it should be fertilized with high-P and high-K. During key growth stages it is best to undertake a foliar fertilization to ensure normal fruit production. As the quantity of female flowers is a key point to increase Schisandra berry yields, barax, ammonium molybdate, and lanthanum nitrate fertilizers can be applied in July as foliar fertilizer.

=== Pests and diseases ===
Temperature dependent damage to Schisandra involve sun scald or frost damage. Sun scald from heat can lead to pathogenic infections. Sun scald can be controlled by applying more organic fertilizers, promoting vertical rooting, keeping an appropriate branch-fruit ratio and leaf-fruit ratio. These prevention measures enhance the plant's tolerance to drought and prevent the direct exposure of the fruits to the sun. Furthermore, irrigation can help to lower surface temperatures on the fruits. Frost damages can cause necrotic leaves and weakens the vitality of the plant. Frost damages can be prevented by covering the roots, maintaining temperatures through smoke or irrigation, applying antifreeze fluid and P-K fertilizers (i.e. phosphorus and potassium fertilizers).

Pests of Schisandra
| Pathogenic pests | Insect pests |
|---|---|
| root and stem rot (Fusarium) | Serica orientalis Motschulsky |
| leaf blight and fruit rot (Botrytis cinerea) | Diaphania pyloalis |
| leaf spot disease (Phoma glomerata) | Pseudaulacaspis pentagona |
| leaf blotch (Alternaria tenuissima) | Eupoecilia ambiguella |
| powdery mildew | Phassus excrescens |
| downy mildew | |

==== Pest control ====
To control weeds, the herbicides paraquat, pendimethalin and glufosinate can be applied.

To control fungal diseases on Schisandra different fungicides are applied such as pyraclostrobin, fluquinconazole, triforine, fenarimol, fenbuconazole, thiophanate-methyl, mancozeb, metalaxyl, benomyl and hexaconazole. Prior to fungicidal application, prevention measures should be applied to lower the risk for fungal outbreaks. Only if economic thresholds are exceeded one should apply fungicides. Prevention measures in Schisandra cultivation could be:

- no transplantation of infected seedlings,
- use of fresh soil,
- appropriate increase of P and K fertilizers (increased plant resistance to disease),
- avoid complete coverage of frame areas and a too high plant density,
- maintain a sufficient ventilation and light transmittance,
- remove dead leaves from the ground in the fall and
- avoid excessive watering.

Insects such as wireworms and nematodes can be controlled with e.g. ethoprophos and aphids can be controlled with e.g. endosulfan. Prevention measures to control insects in Schisandra cultures could be:

- remove the insects by hand if they appear in small numbers,
- remove dead leaves and injured branches (sources of insects),
- use insect traps and
- biological control agents (e.g. parasitic wasps).

To lower infections of soil-borne diseases carbendazol hydratable powder or amobam can be applied after sowing.

=== Harvesting ===
The first fruit harvest of the Schisandra plant usually takes place 4–5 years after planting. In China, the ripe fruits are harvested in September. The berries in Europe may ripen earlier, possibly in August.

== Uses ==
Its berries are used in traditional medicine. Chemical constituents include the lignans schisandrin, deoxyschizandrin, gomisins, and pregomisin. When crushed, the leaves release a lemony smell and can be used as a vegetable.

Koreans make the berries, known as omija (Hangul: 오미자), into a cordial drink called omija-cha, meaning "omija tea"; see Korean tea. The Ainu people indigenous to Japan used this plant (called repnihat) as a remedy for colds and sea-sickness.

== In popular culture ==
In 1998, Russia released a postage stamp depicting S. chinensis.

== Gallery ==
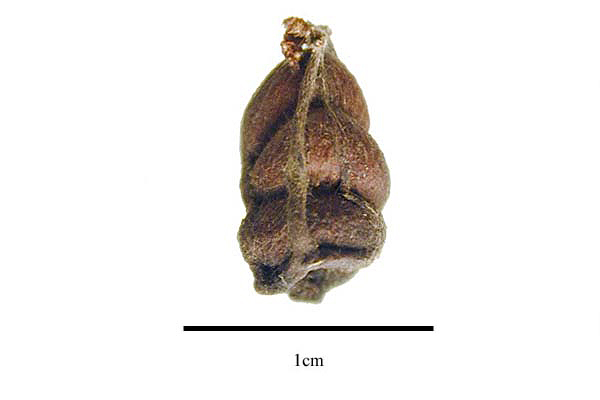
Dried fruit

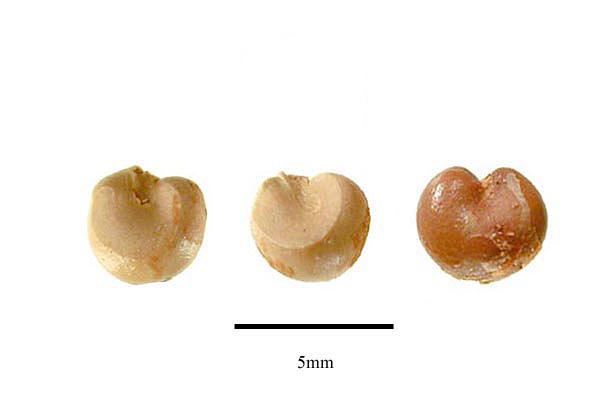
Seeds

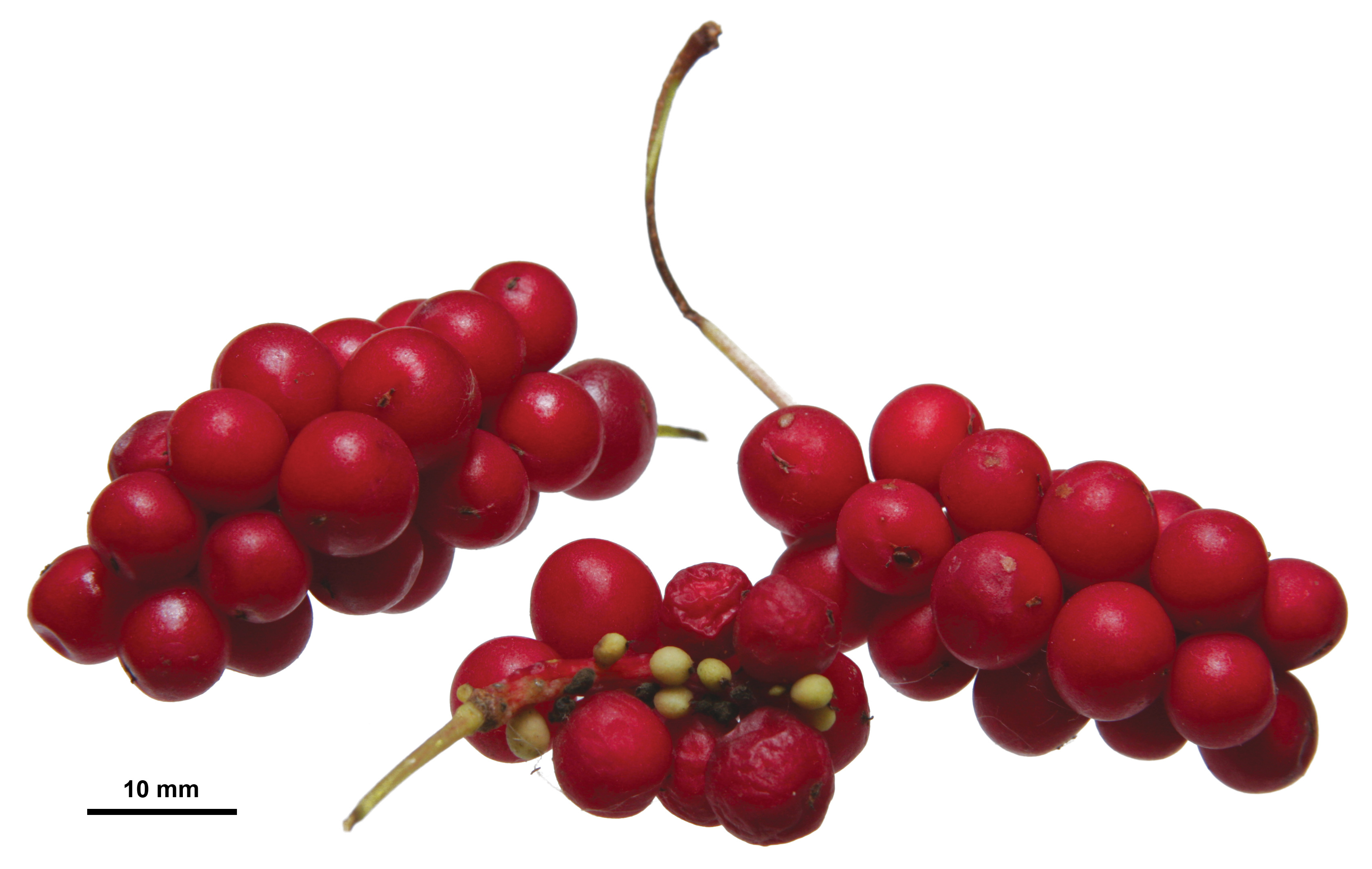
Berries

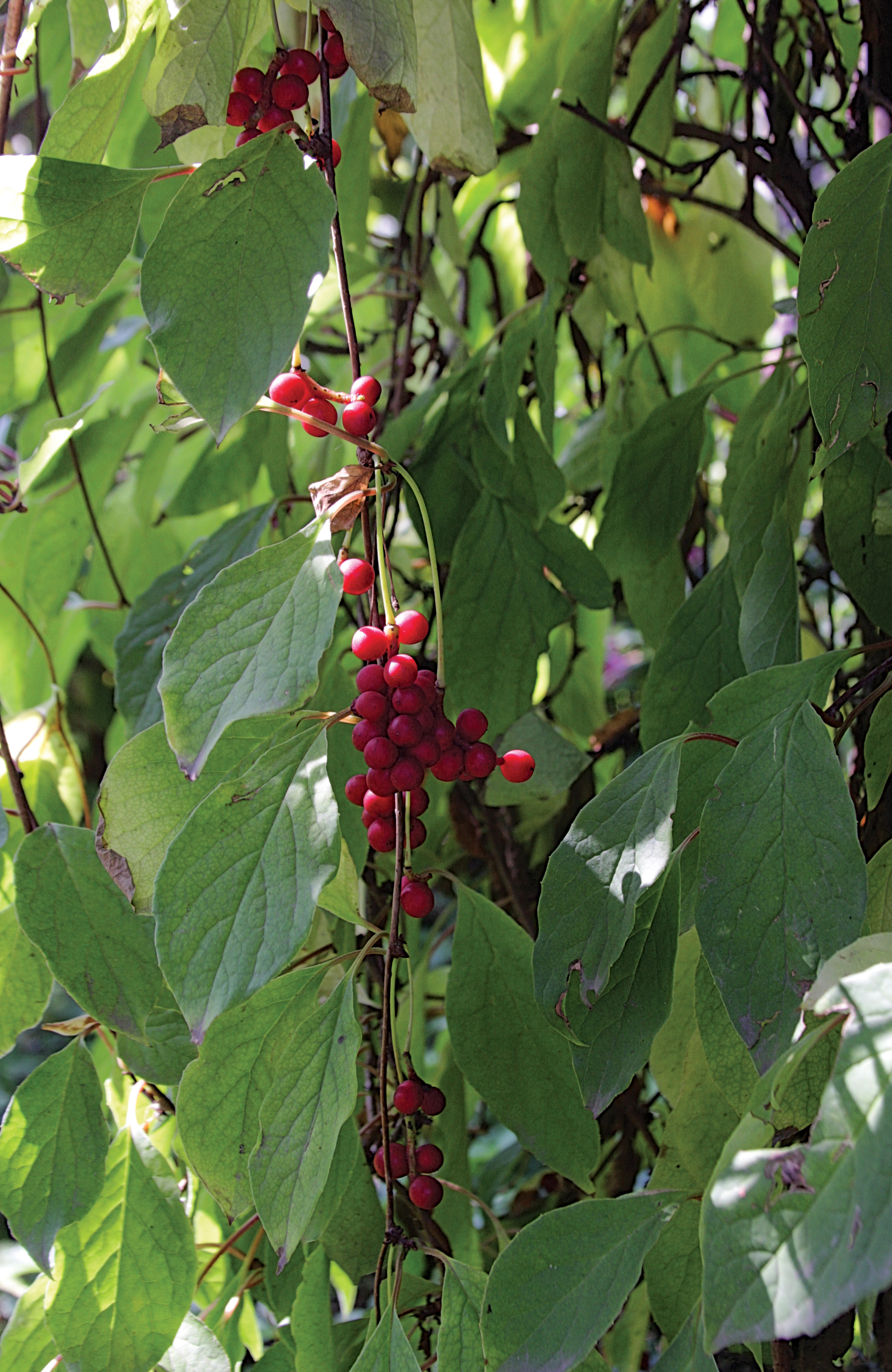

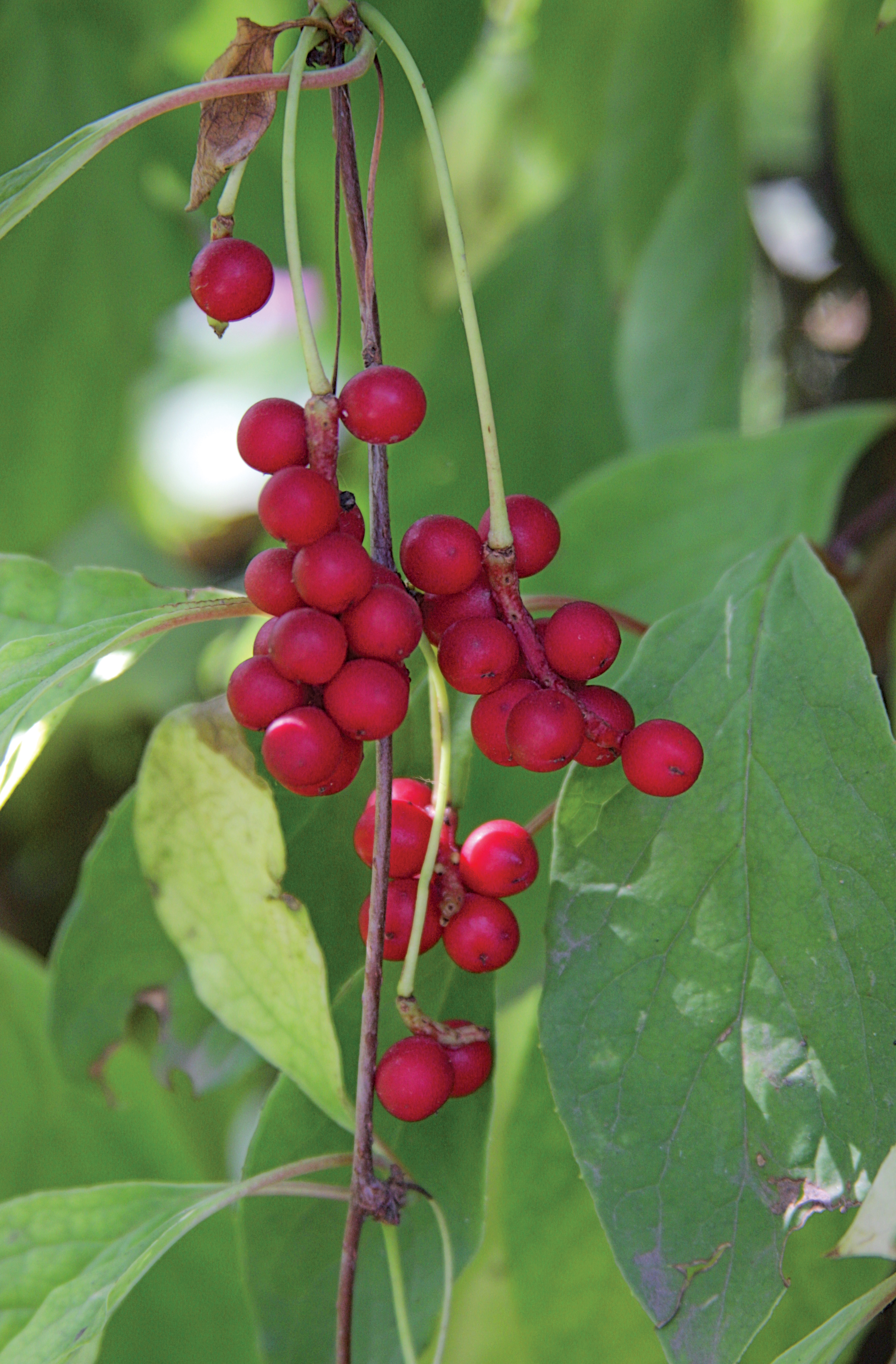

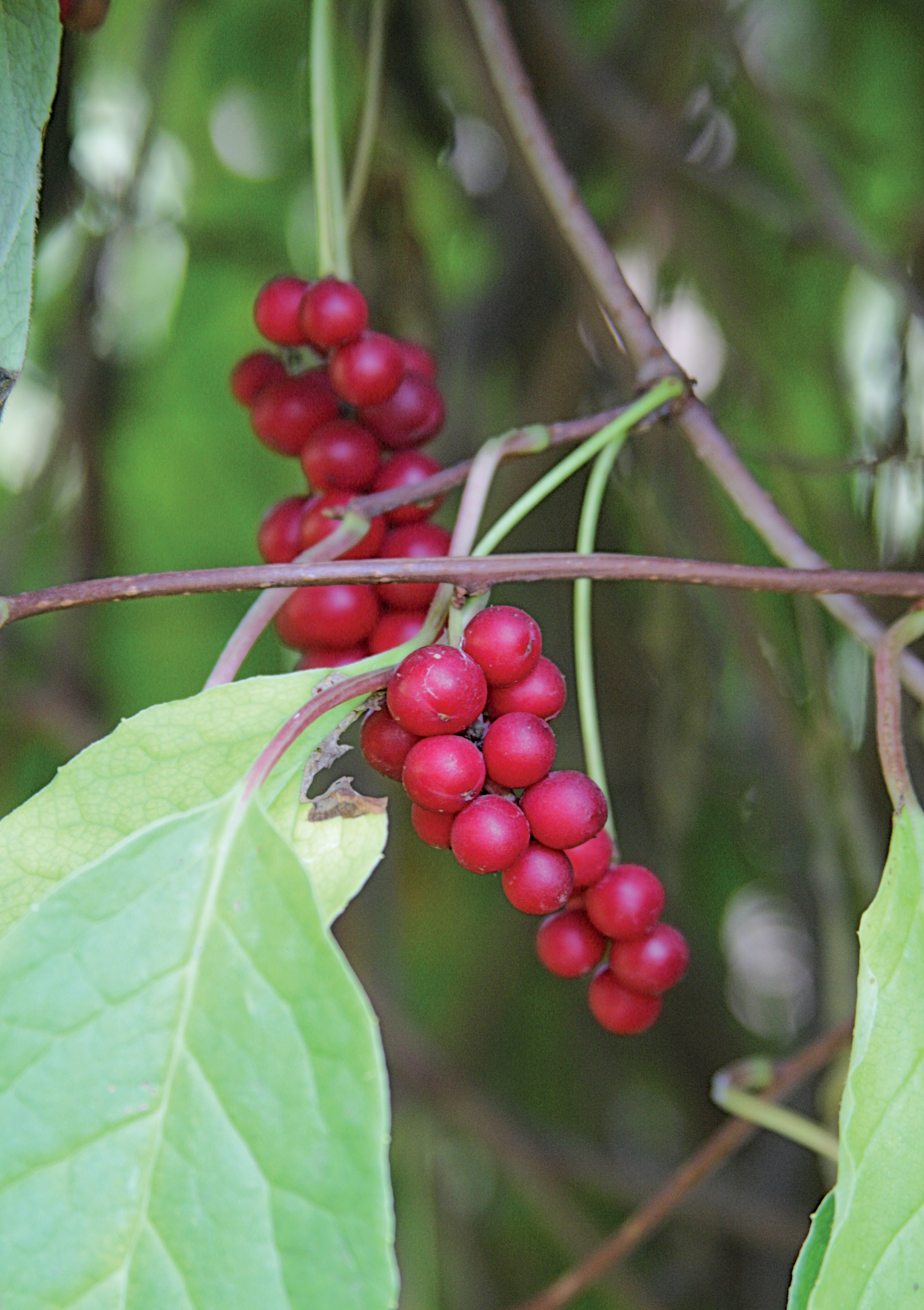

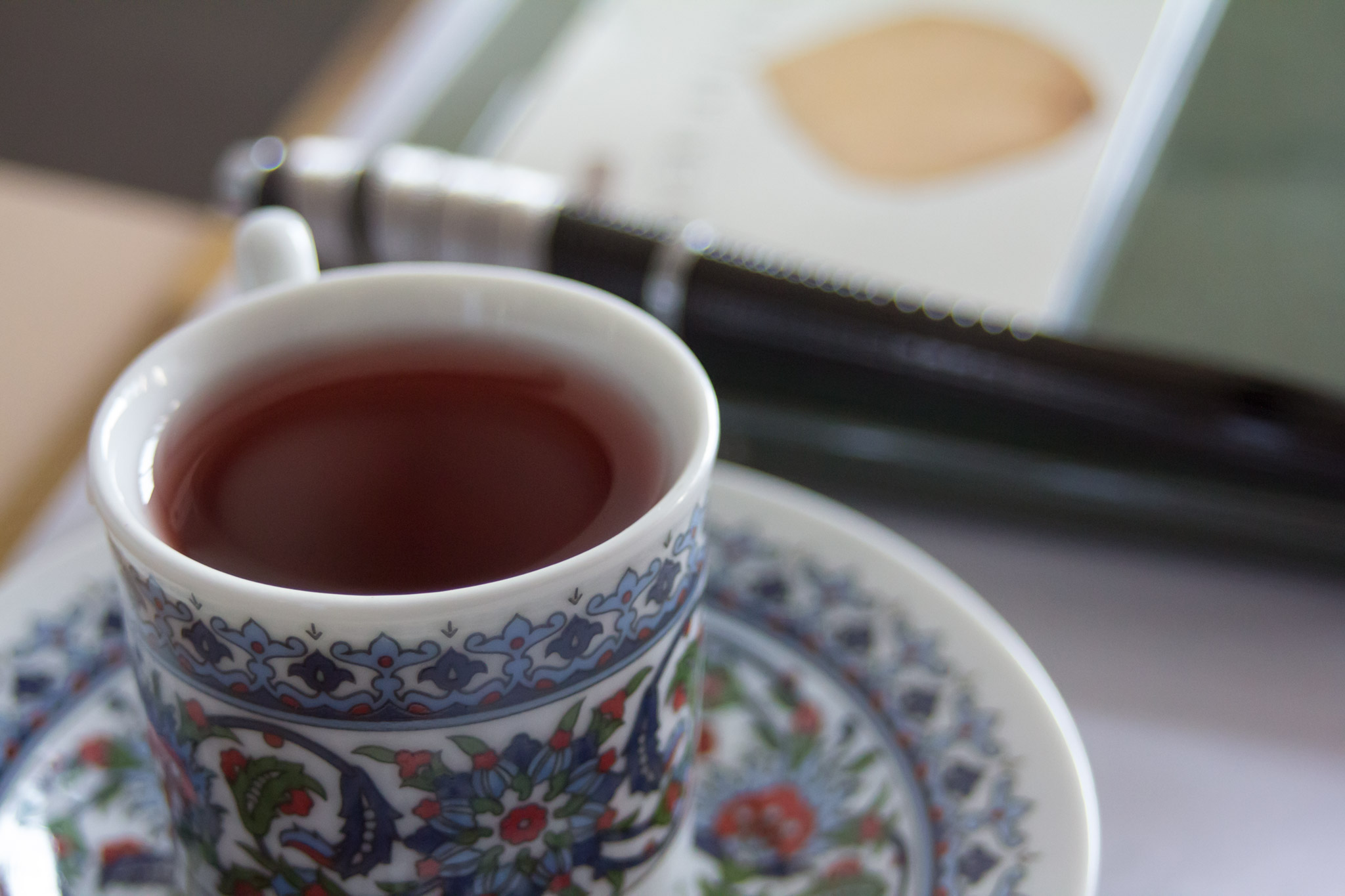
Omija-cha (magnolia berry tea)

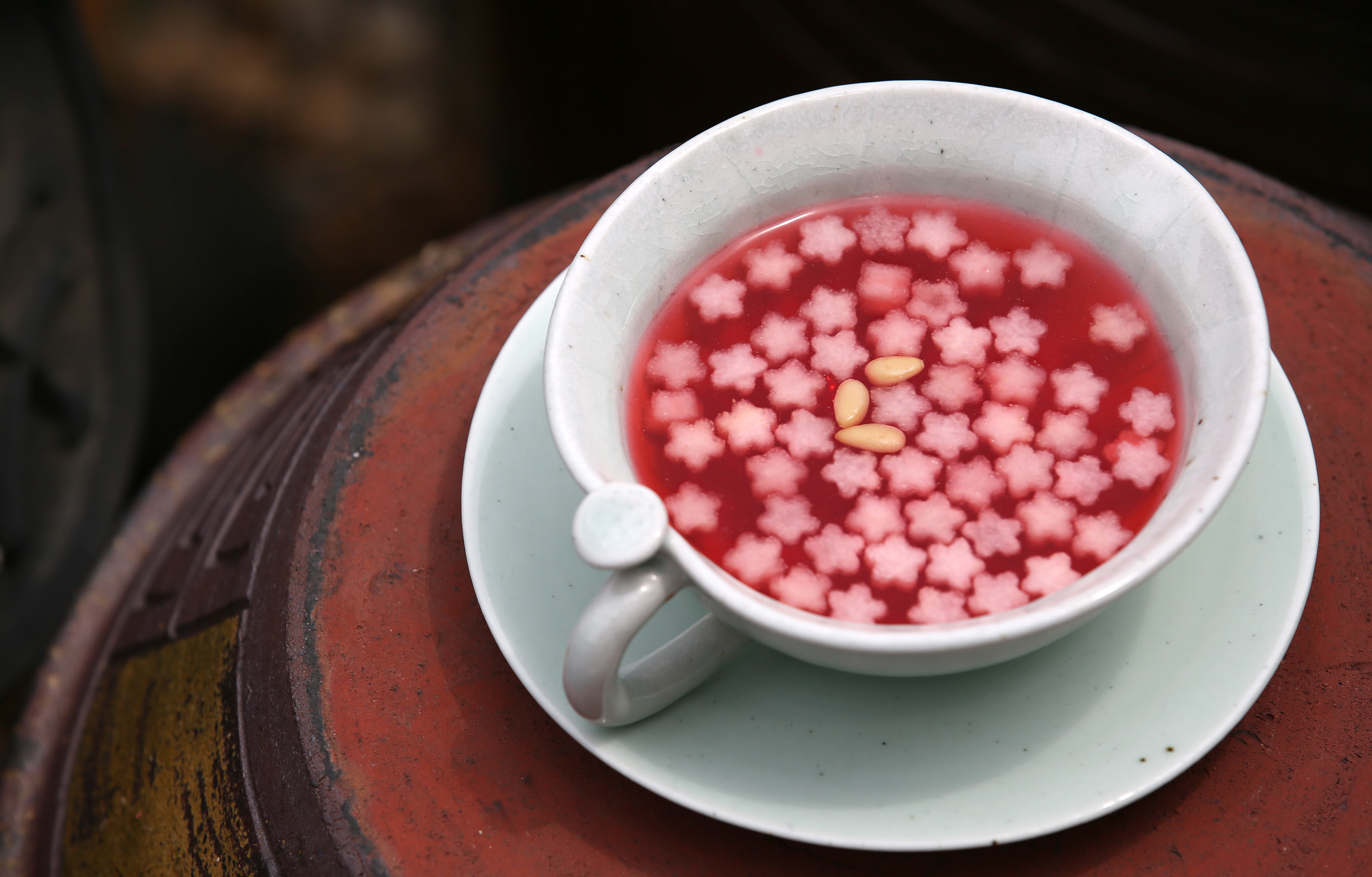
Omija-hwachae (magnolia berry punch)
