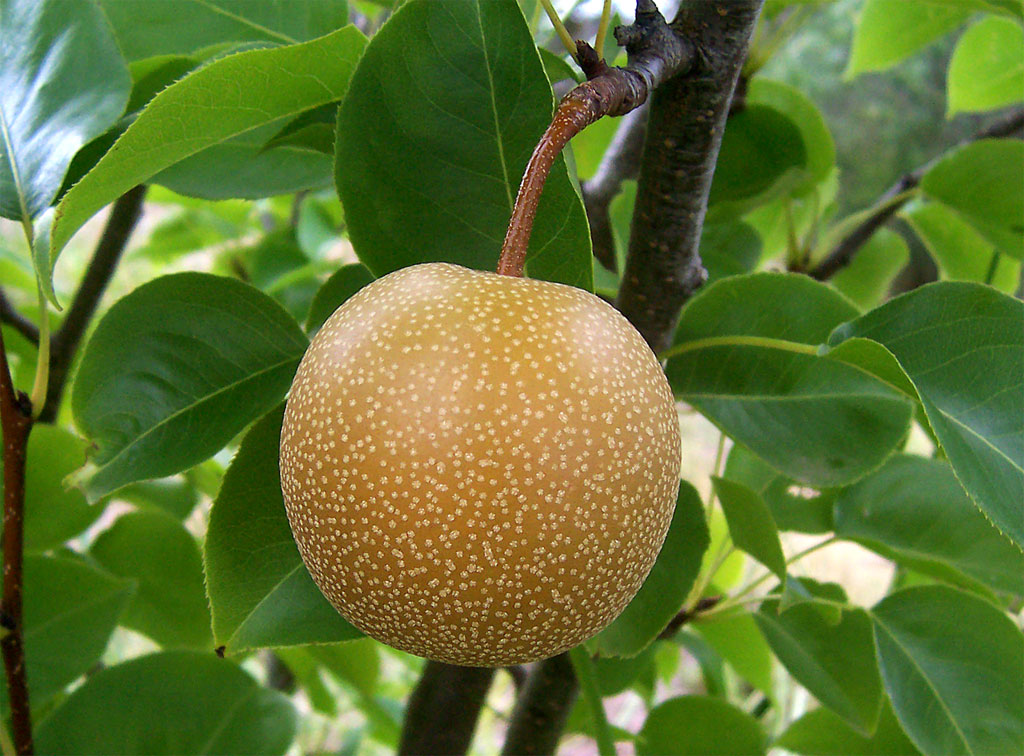

Scientific classification
- Kingdom: Plantae
- Clade: Embryophytes
- Clade: Tracheophytes
- Clade: Spermatophytes
- Clade: Angiosperms
- Clade: Eudicots
- Clade: Rosids
- Order: Rosales
- Family: Rosaceae
- Genus: Pyrus
- Section: Pyrus sect. Pashia
- Species: P. pyrifolia

Binomial name
- Pyrus pyrifolia (Burm.f.) Nak.

Synonyms
- List: Pyrus arakiana Koidz.; Pyrus asakeensis Koidz.; Pyrus autumnalis (Siebold) Koidz.; Pyrus babauttiagi Koidz.; Pyrus cuneata Koidz.; Pyrus higoensis Koidz.; Pyrus incubacea Koidz.; Pyrus kiushiana Koidz.; Pyrus kleinhofiana Koidz.; Pyrus lakuhokuensis Koidz.; Pyrus lasiogyna Koidz.; Pyrus lindleyi Rehder; Pyrus nehiyamadonis Koidz.; Pyrus pseudocalleryana Uyeki; Pyrus pseudouipongensis Uyeki; Pyrus pyrifolia var. talyschensis Gladkova; Pyrus saidaeana Koidz.; Pyrus serotina Rehder; Pyrus sinensis Lindl.; Pyrus sohayakiensis Koidz.; Pyrus tajimaensis Koidz.; Pyrus tambana Koidz.; Pyrus tobisimensis Koidz.; Pyrus togashiana Koidz.; Pyrus tsuchiyana Koidz.; Pyrus tungusiana Koidz.; Pyrus uipongensis Uyeki; Pyrus umemurana Koidz.; Pyrus uyematsuana Makino; Pyrus yohrohensis Koidz.

= Pyrus pyrifolia =

Species of pear with round crisp grainy fruit

Pyrus pyrifolia is a species of pear tree native to southern China and northern Indochina that has been introduced to Korea, Japan and other parts of the world. The tree's edible fruit is known by many names, including Asian pear, Persian pear, Japanese pear, Chinese pear, Korean pear, Taiwanese pear, apple pear, zodiac pear, three-halves pear, papple, naspati, bata kisbis, Fefeta grained pear and sand pear. Along with cultivars of P. × bretschneideri and Pyrus ussuriensis, the fruit is also called the nashi pear. Cultivars derived from Pyrus pyrifolia are grown throughout East Asia, and in other countries such Pakistan, Nepal, Australia, New Zealand, and America. Traditionally in East Asia the tree's flowers are a popular symbol of early spring, and it is a common sight in gardens and the countryside.

Asian pears
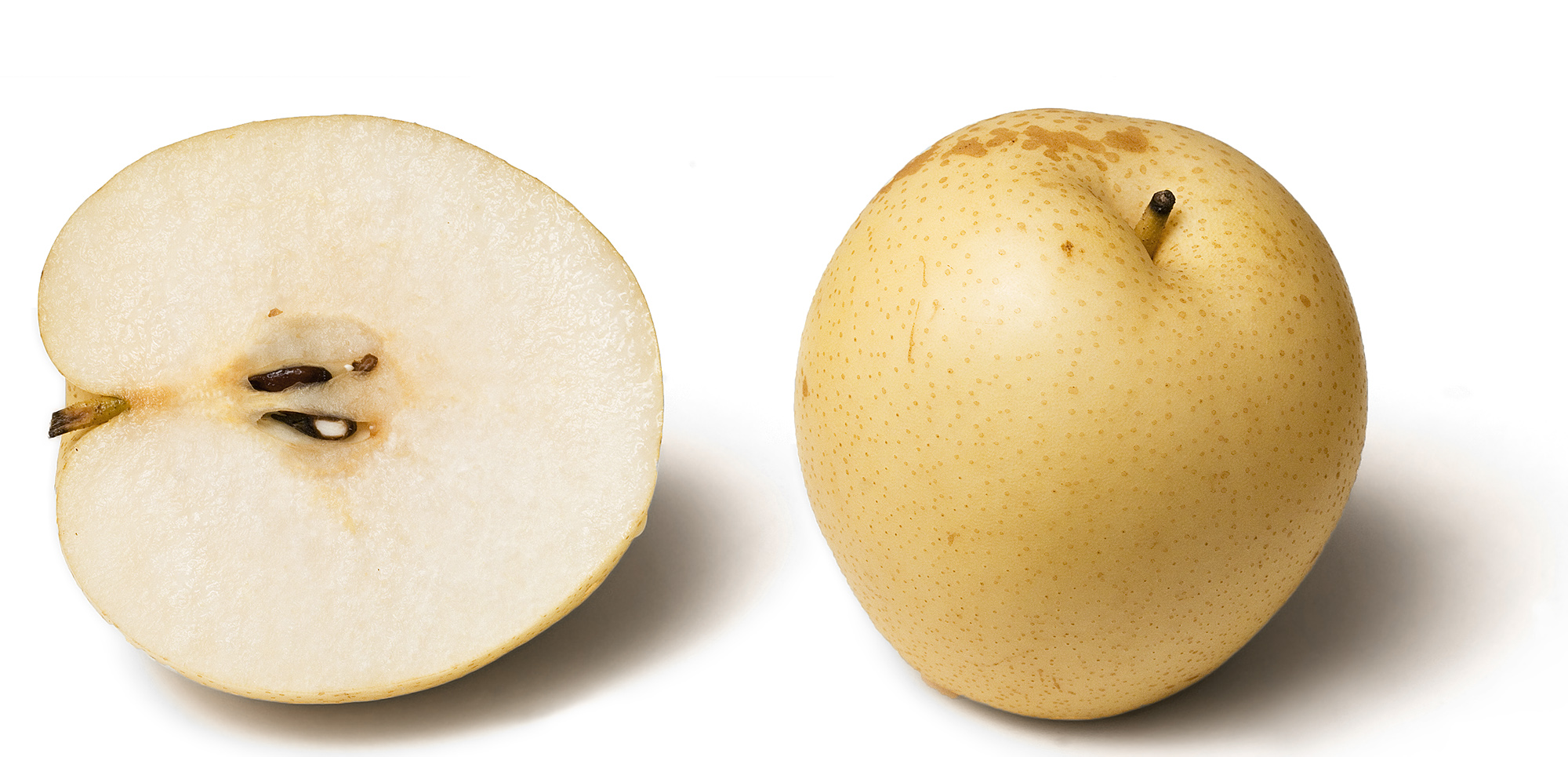
- Nashi pear (Pyrus pyrifolia)

Nutritional value per 100 g (3.5 oz)
- Energy: 176 kJ (42 kcal)
- Carbohydrates: 10.65 g
- Sugars: 7.05 g
- Dietary fiber: 3.6 g
- Fat: 0.23 g
- Protein: 0.5 g
Vitamins and minerals
Vitamins	Quantity %DV^{†}
Thiamine (B1)	1% 0.009 mg
Riboflavin (B2)	1% 0.01 mg
Niacin (B3)	1% 0.219 mg
Pantothenic acid (B5)	1% 0.07 mg
Vitamin B6	1% 0.022 mg
Folate (B9)	2% 8 μg
Choline	1% 5.1 mg
Vitamin C	4% 3.8 mg
Vitamin E	1% 0.12 mg
Vitamin K	4% 4.5 μg
Minerals	Quantity %DV^{†}
Calcium	0% 4 mg
Magnesium	2% 8 mg
Manganese	3% 0.06 mg
Phosphorus	1% 11 mg
Potassium	4% 121 mg
Sodium	0% 0 mg
- Link to USDA Database entry
- ^{†}Percentages estimated using US recommendations for adults, except for potassium, which is estimated based on expert recommendation from the National Academies.

The fruits are not generally baked in pies or made into jams because they have a high water content and a crisp, grainy texture, very different from the European varieties. They are commonly served raw and peeled. The fruit tends to be quite large and fragrant. If not carefully wrapped, having a tendency to bruise because of its juiciness, it can last for several weeks (or more) in a cold, dry place.

== Culture ==
Due to their relatively high price and the large size of the fruit of cultivars, the pears tend to be served to guests, given as gifts, or eaten together in a family setting.

In cooking, ground pears are used in vinegar- or soy sauce-based sauces as a sweetener, instead of sugar. They are also used when marinating meat, especially beef, with a notable example being in the Korean dish bulgogi, due to the presence of enzymes to tenderize the proteins in the meat.

In Australia, these pears were first introduced into commercial production beginning in 1980.

In Japan, fruit is harvested in Chiba, Ibaraki, Tottori, Fukushima, Tochigi, Nagano, Niigata, Saitama and other prefectures, except Okinawa. Nashi (梨) may be used as a late autumn kigo, or "season word", when writing haiku. Nashi no hana (梨の花, pear flower) is also used as a kigo of spring. At least one city (Kamagaya-Shi, Chiba Prefecture) has the flowers of this tree as an official city flower.

In Nepal (Nepali: Naspati नस्पाती) and the Himalayan states of India, they are cultivated as a cash crop in the Middle Hills between about 1,500 and 2,500 metres (5,000 and 8,000 ft) in elevation, where the climate is suitable. The fruit are carried to nearby markets by human porters or, increasingly, by truck, but not for long distances because they bruise easily.

In Taiwan, pears harvested in Japan have become luxurious presents since 1997 and their consumption has jumped.

In China, the term "sharing a pear" (Chinese: 分梨; pinyin: fēn lí) is a homophone of "separate" (simplified Chinese: 分离; traditional Chinese: 分離; pinyin: fēnlí). As a result, sharing a pear with a loved one can be read as a desire to separate from them.

In Korea, the fruit is known as bae (배), and it is grown and consumed in great quantity. In the South Korean city of Naju, there is a museum called The Naju Pear Museum and Pear Orchard for Tourists (나주 배 박물관 및 배밭 관광체험).

In Cyprus, the pears were introduced in 2010 after initially being investigated as a new fruit crop for the island in the early 1990s. They are currently grown in Kyperounta.

== Cultivars ==
Cultivars are classified in two groups. Most of the cultivars belong to the Akanashi ('Russet pears') group, and have yellowish-brown rinds. The Aonashi ('Green pears') have yellow-green rinds.

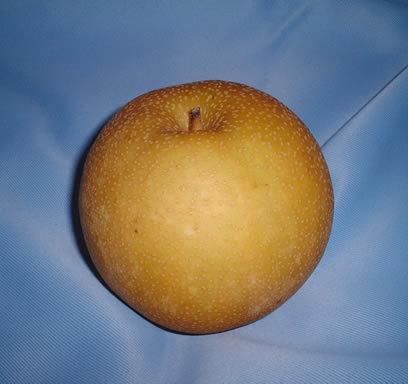
Kosui

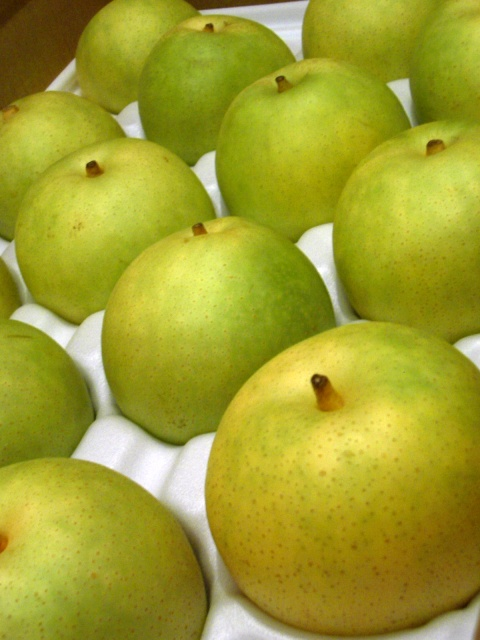
Nijisseiki

Important cultivars include:

- 'Chojuro' (長十郎, Japan, 1893?) ('Russet pears')
- 'Kosui' (幸水, Japan, 1959; the most important cultivar in Japan) ('Russet pears')
- 'Hosui' (豊水, Japan, 1972) ('Russet pears')
- 'Imamuraaki' (今村秋, Japan, native) ('Russet pears')
- 'Nijisseiki' (二十世紀, Japan, 1898; name means "20th century", also spelled 'Nijusseiki') ('Green pears')
- 'Niitaka' (新高, Japan, 1927) ('Russet pears')
- 'Okusankichi' (晩三吉, Japan, native) ('Russet pears')
- 'Raja' (new) ('Russet pears')
- 'Shinko' (新興, Japan, pre-1941) ('Russet pears') ('Russet pears')
- 'Hwangkeum' (황금, 黄金, Korea, 1984, 'Niitaka' × 'Nijisseiki')
- 'Huanghuali' (not to be confused with the wood of Dalbergia odorifera, also called Huanghuali)

=== Kanji ===
The Japanese kanji for this fruit (梨) is one of the kyōiku kanji, the kanji taught in elementary school in Japan. Added in 2017, it was one of 20 new kyōiku kanji that were found in the names of prefectures of Japan.

In Chinese, the character refers to pears generally.

== Gallery ==
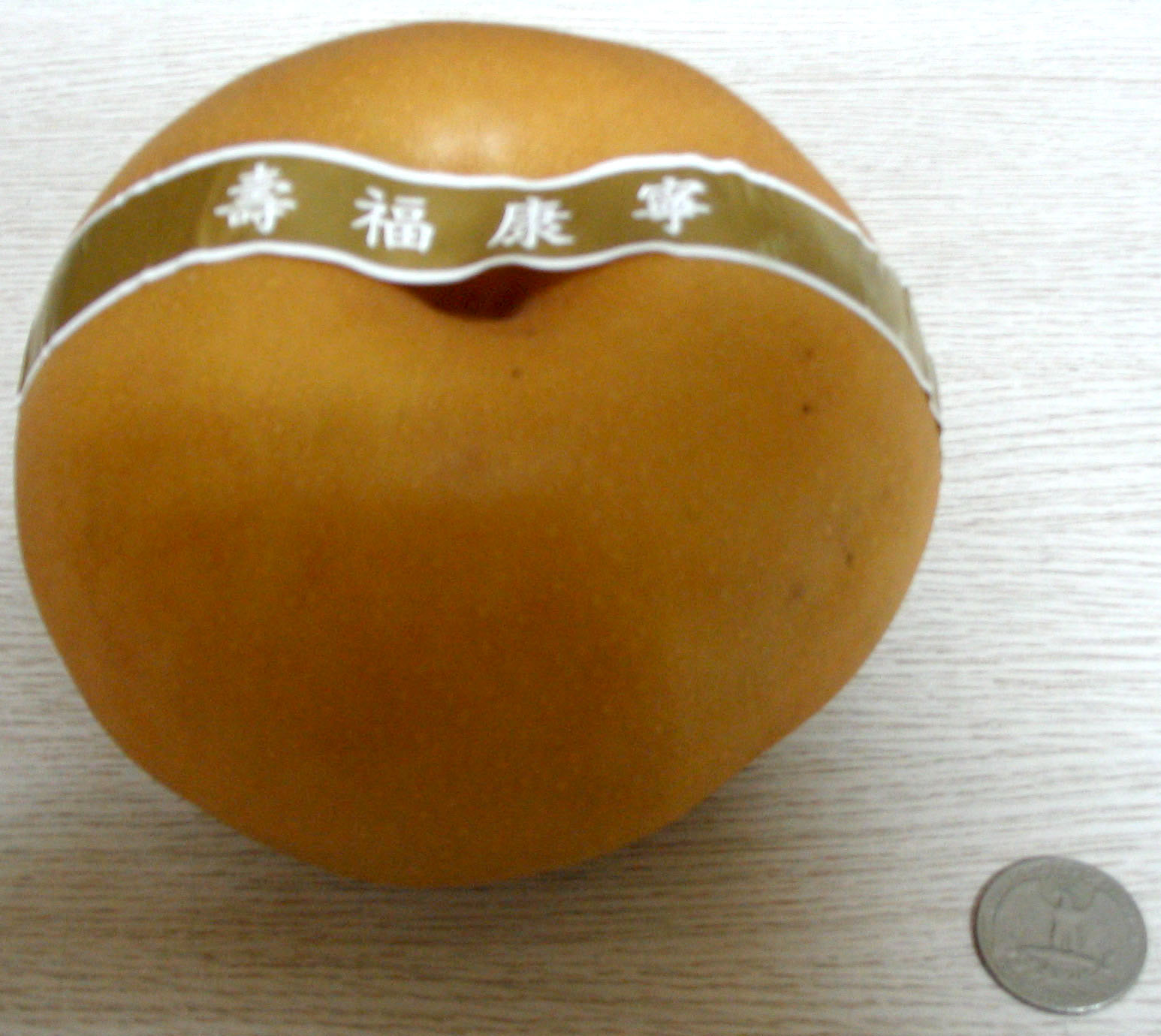
A Japanese pear wrapped with a ribbon to give as a gift. A United States quarter is provided for scale.

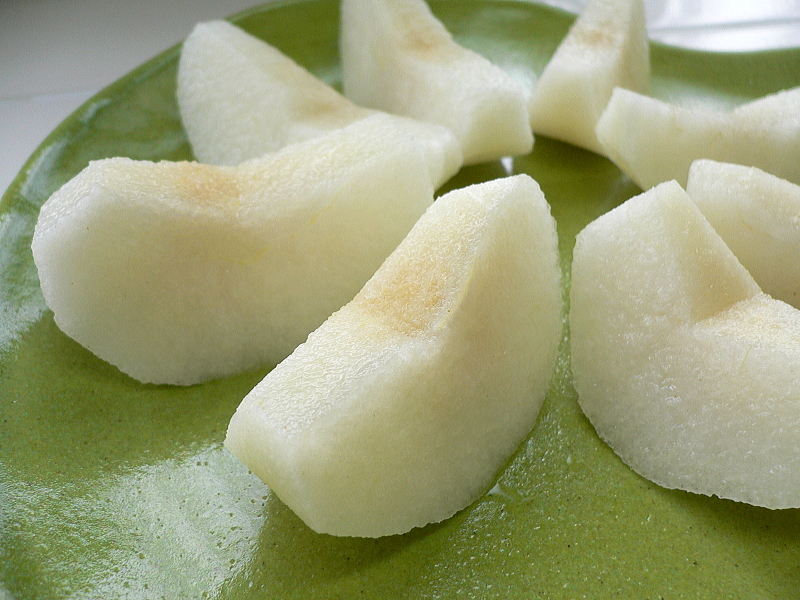
Sliced

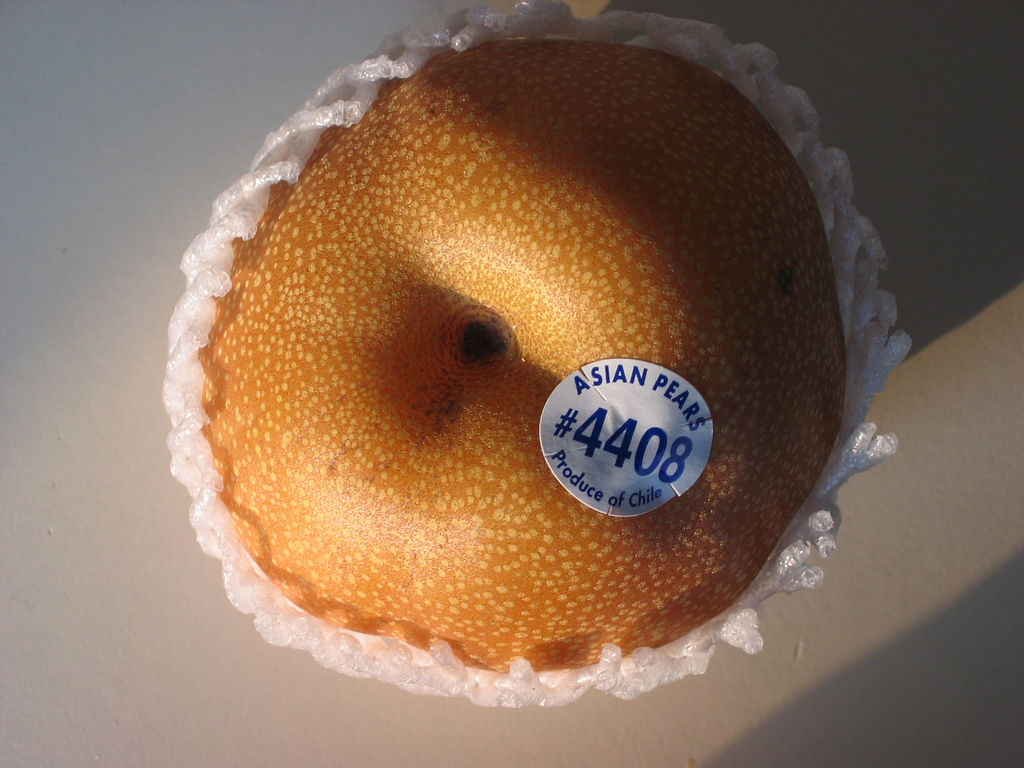
Padded to stop bruising

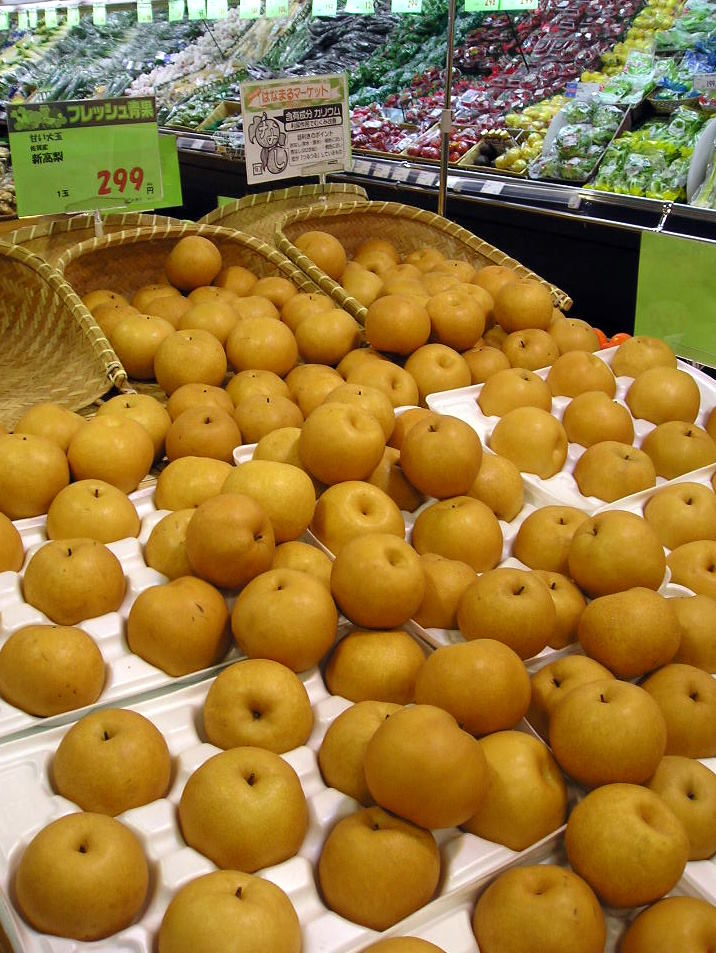
Group foamed for shipping

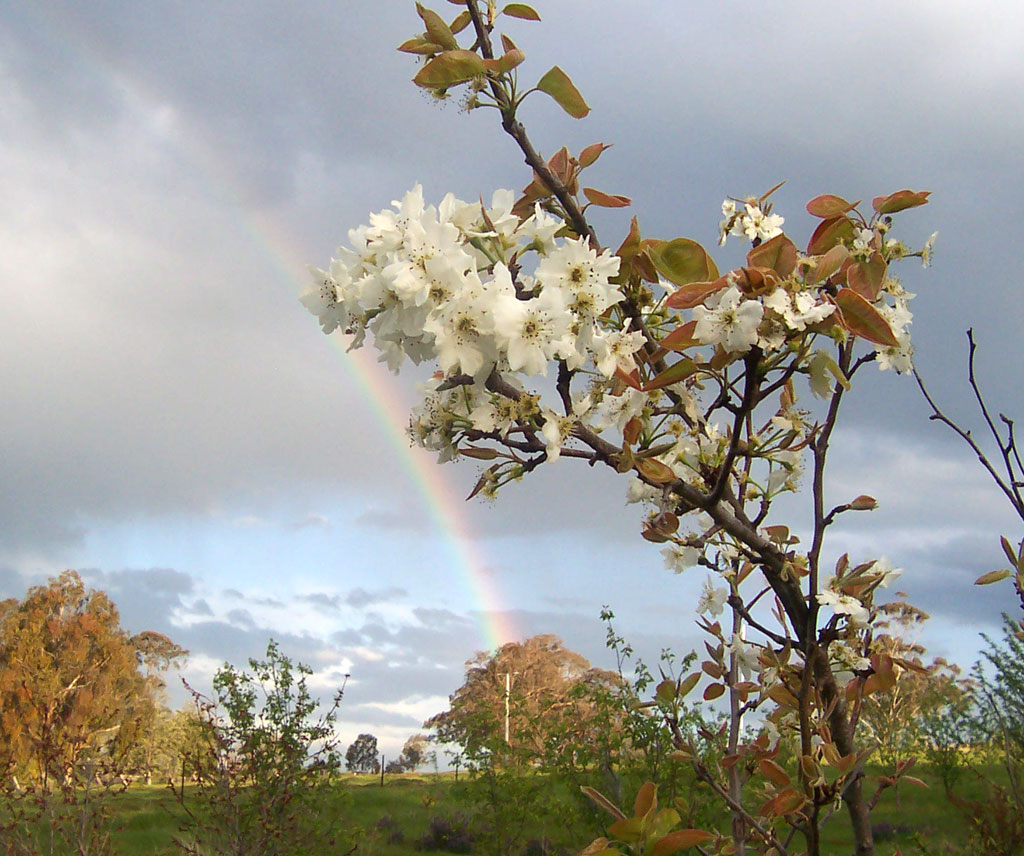
Nashi pear tree in bloom

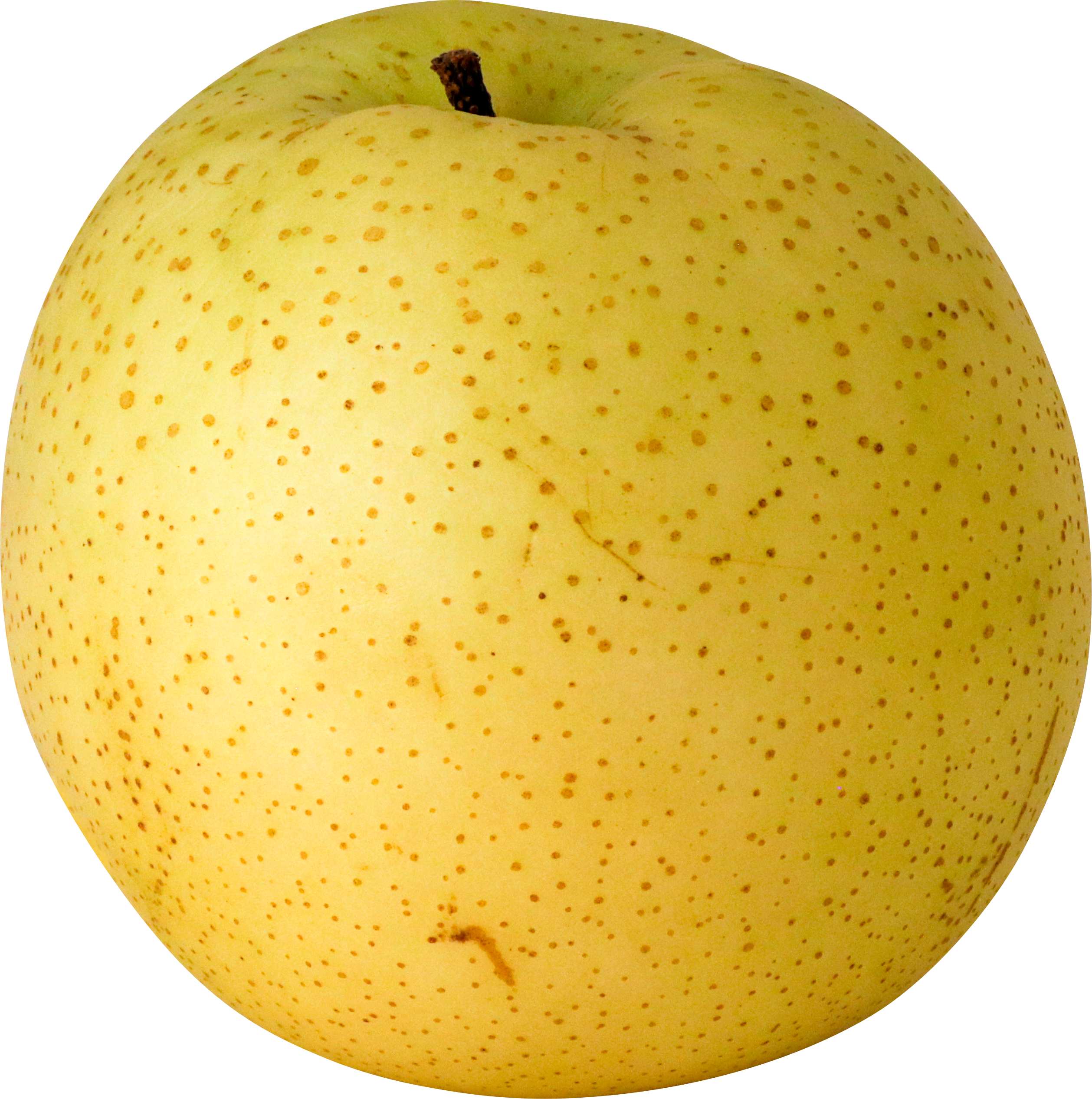
Whole Golden Asian Pear
