= Cherry cola =

Soft drink

Cherry Cola
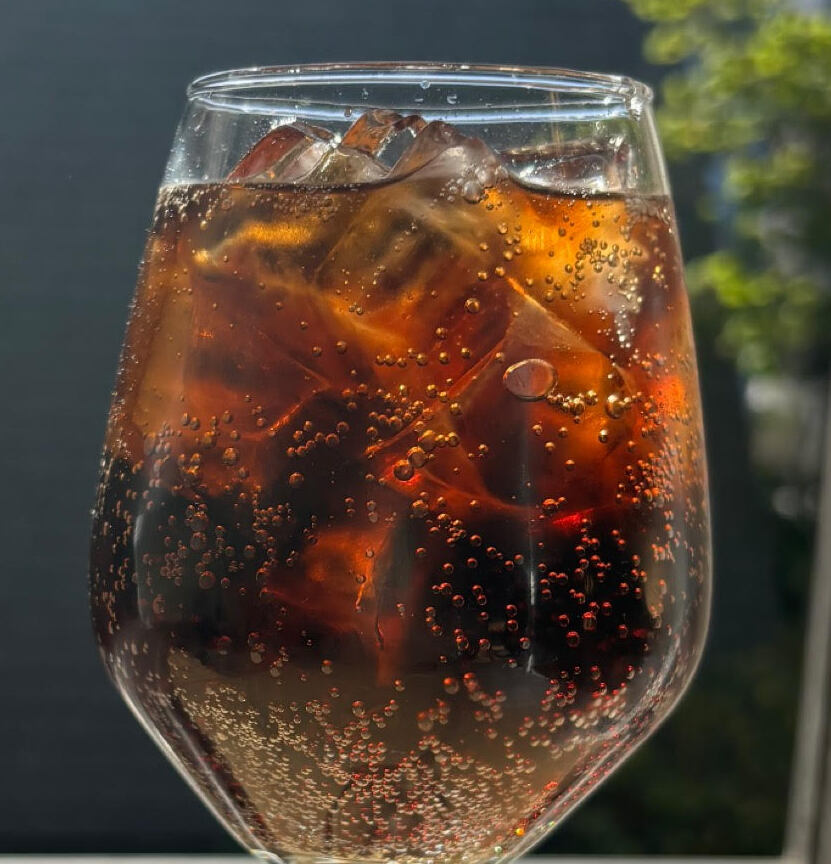
- A glass of cherry cola served with ice cubes
- Type: Soft drink
- Manufacturer: Various
- Color: Caramel (with certain exceptions such as Zevia Cola and Kola Román)
- Flavor: Cola (kola nut, citrus, cinnamon, cherry and vanilla)

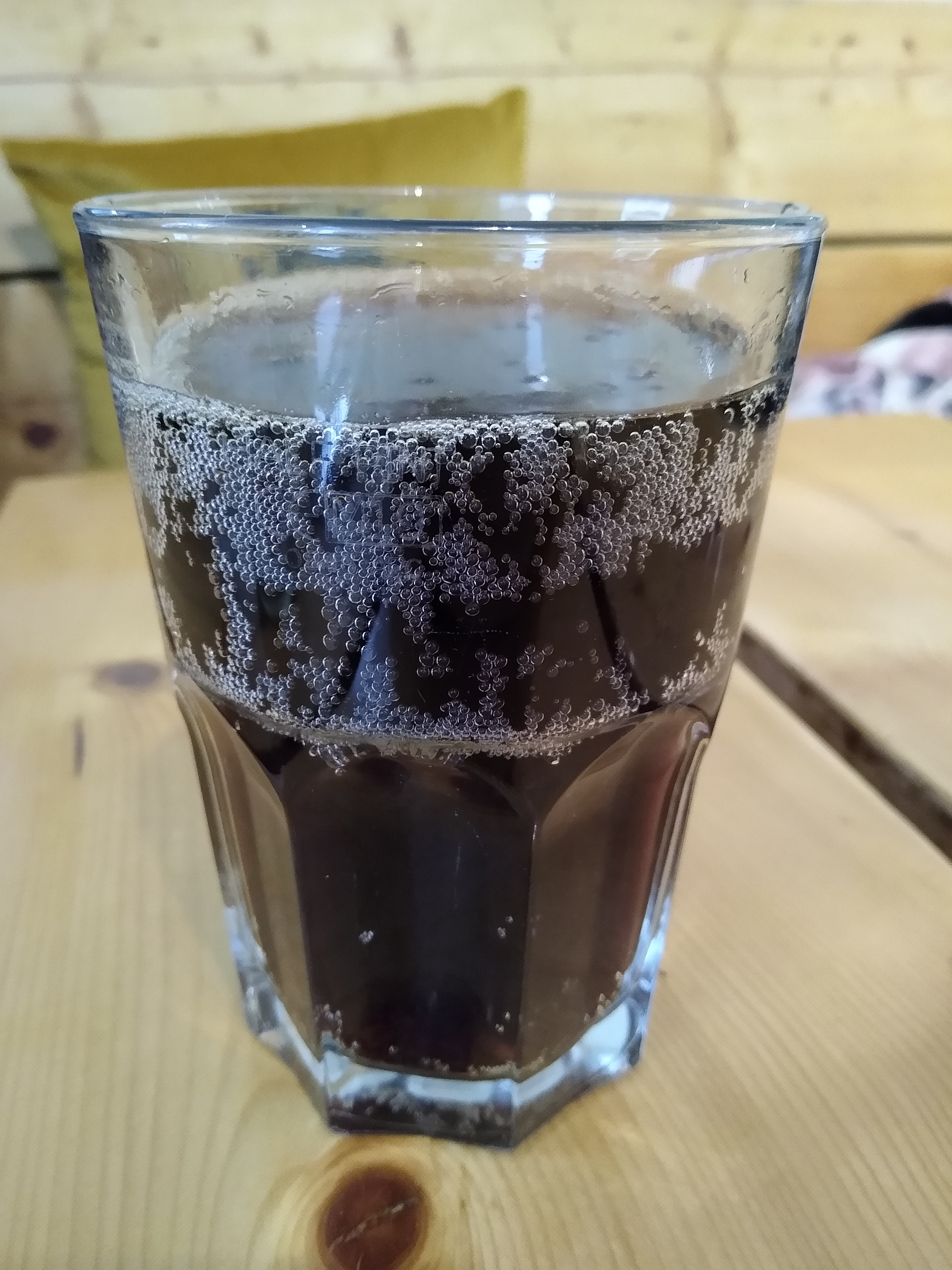
Cherry cola

Cherry cola is a soft drink blend of cherry-flavored syrup and cola.

== History ==
Throughout the years, several major soda manufacturers have introduced their interpretations of cherry cola, including established brands such as Coca-Cola Cherry, Pepsi Wild Cherry, and Cherry RC. Coca-Cola and Pepsi both released versions in 1985, aimed at the ages 12 to 17 demographic, with Pepsi being the first to take it to market on November 10 that year. By 2023, Coca-Cola Cherry emerged as the leader in terms of sales and revenue within this category.

Alcoholic variants of the drink also exist, typically featuring cola as a base, combined with vodka or grenadine.

== Production ==
The first step in the production of cherry cola involves blending the cherry-flavored syrup with other flavorings such as kola nut, citrus, vanilla, and cinnamon. This mixture is carefully prepared to achieve a consistent and desired flavor profile that defines the cherry cola's unique taste. After the syrup blend is prepared, carbonation is introduced. This process involves dissolving carbon dioxide (CO_{2}) into the cola under high pressure, creating the fizzy texture that is characteristic of carbonated beverages. The carbonation level is closely monitored to ensure it meets the product's specifications. The final step in the production process is bottling. The carbonated cherry cola is transferred into bottles or cans, which are then sealed to preserve the beverage's carbonation and flavor. This stage also includes quality control measures to ensure that each bottle or can meets the established standards for the product.

== Uses ==
Cherry cola has found a prominent place in both the beverage industry and culinary world. Firstly, cherry cola is widely consumed as a standalone beverage. Its flavor profile, which combines cherries with the taste of cola, makes it popular among consumers seeking a variation from traditional cola drinks. In addition to being consumed on its own, cherry cola is also utilized as a mixer in the preparation of cocktails and mocktails. For cocktails, cherry cola can be paired with various liquors such as rum, bourbon, or vodka. In mocktails, which do not contain alcohol, cherry cola serves as a key ingredient, providing a flavor base that complements other non-alcoholic components.

Companies that sell cherry cola
Name	Drink name	Company launch year
Coca Cola	Cherry Coke	May 8, 1886
Pepsi	Wild Cherry Pepsi	1898
Bawls	Bawls Cherry Cola	1996
Boylan	Boylan Black Cherry Cola	1891
Zevia	Zevia Cherry Cola	2007
Cheerwine	Cheerwine Cherry Cola	1917
Jones Soda	Jones Cherry Cola	1995
Signature Select	Signature Cherry Cola	1915
Fentimans	Fentimans Cherry Cola	1905
Olipop	OIipop Cherry Cola	2018
Sprecher	Sprecher Cherry Cola	1985
Shasta	Shasta Cherry Cola	1889

== See also ==
- Cherry juice
- List of brand name soft drinks products
- List of soft drink flavors
- List of soft drink producers
- List of soft drinks by country
- Queen Mary (cocktail)
- Roy Rogers (drink)
