= Mocktail =

Non-alcoholic mixed drink

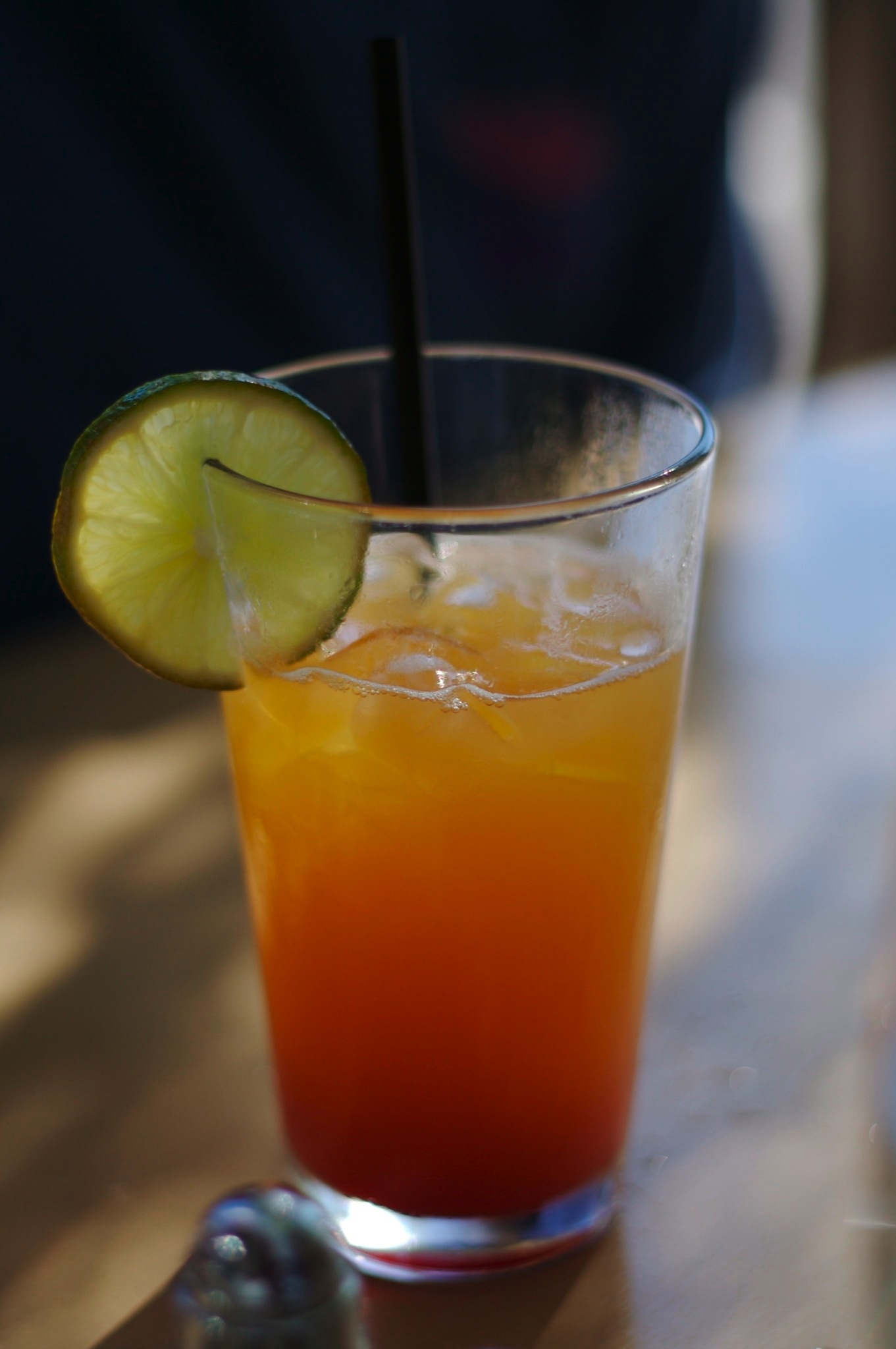
A Shirley Temple mocktail is traditionally made from grenadine and ginger ale. Modern versions like this one may use orange juice or 7-up, and can be served with lime.

A mocktail is a cocktail-style beverage made without alcohol. They are also known under the names non-alcoholic mixed drink, virgin cocktail, temperance drink, and zero-proof cocktails.

Non-alcoholic mixed drinks date back to when cocktails emerged, appearing as "temperance drinks" in the first American cocktail books, including Jerry Thomas's Bar-Tenders Guide (1862). Merriam-Webster cites the first mention of "mocktail" as appearing in 1916.

While the name of the non-alcoholic drink, as well as its style, has evolved over time, it is often a reflection of cocktail culture at large. The 1980s saw the resurgence of a mocktail movement with often sugary drinks. Following the sophistication of cocktail culture of the 2000s, the zero proof drink also became more refined.

In the 2000s, non-alcoholic drinks became popular enough to find their place on cocktail menus in many restaurants and bars, especially temperance bars. According to Mintel, alcohol-free mixed drinks grew 35% as a beverage type on the menus of bars and restaurants from 2016 to 2019 in the US. In 2019, The Providence Journal reported that there were at least 4 bars in New York City that served mocktails only.

Zero proof drinks can be made in the style of classic cocktails, like a non-alcoholic gimlet, or can represent a new style of drink altogether. The popularity of drinking abstinence programs like Dry January, coinciding with the rise of the health and wellness culture has pushed non-alcoholic drinks to wider acceptance. Like the vegetarian food movement or the popularity of oat milk, zero proof drinks are now seen as valid choices for all types of drinkers.

== See also ==
- List of non-alcoholic mixed drinks
