= List of non-alcoholic mixed drinks =

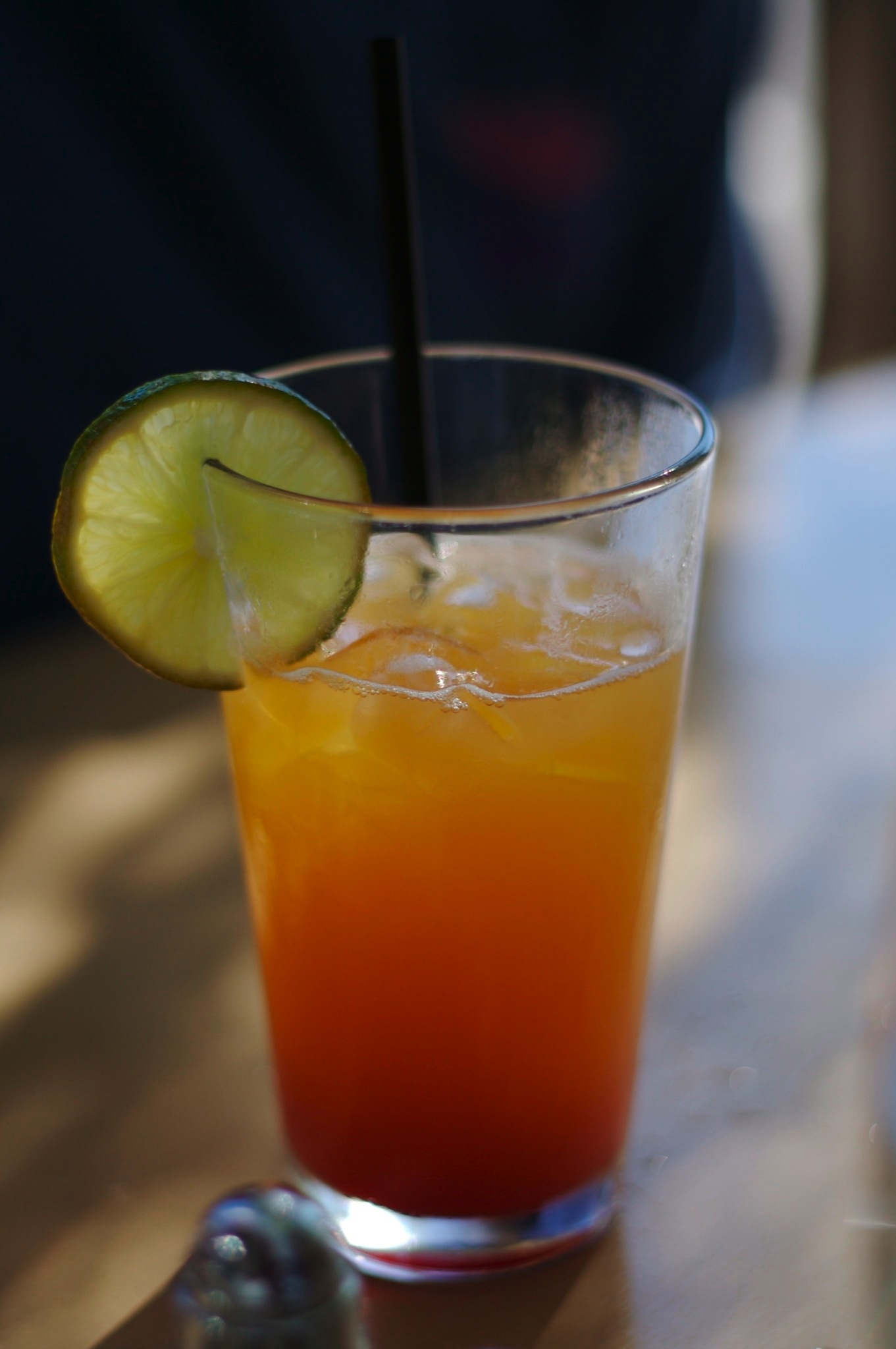
A Shirley Temple mocktail is traditionally made from grenadine and ginger ale. Modern versions like this one may use orange juice or 7-up, and can be served with lime.

A non-alcoholic mixed drink (also known as virgin cocktail, temperance drink, zero-proof cocktails or mocktail) is a cocktail-style beverage made without alcohol. They can be made in the style of classic cocktails, or can represent a new drink altogether.

Non-alcoholic mixed drinks date back to when cocktails emerged, appearing as "temperance drinks" in the first American cocktail books, including Jerry Thomas's Bar-Tenders Guide (1862). Merriam-Webster cites the first mention of "mocktail" as appearing in 1916.

The names and styles of non-alcoholic drinks have evolved over time, often as a reflection of broader cocktail culture. This included sweet cocktails in the 1980s, and more refined drinks in the 2000s. The market for non-alcoholic drinks in the US has grown markedly in the 21st century. Their consumption has grown with the rise of abstinence programs like Dry January, and a broader rise in health and wellness culture.

== List of non-alcoholic cocktails ==
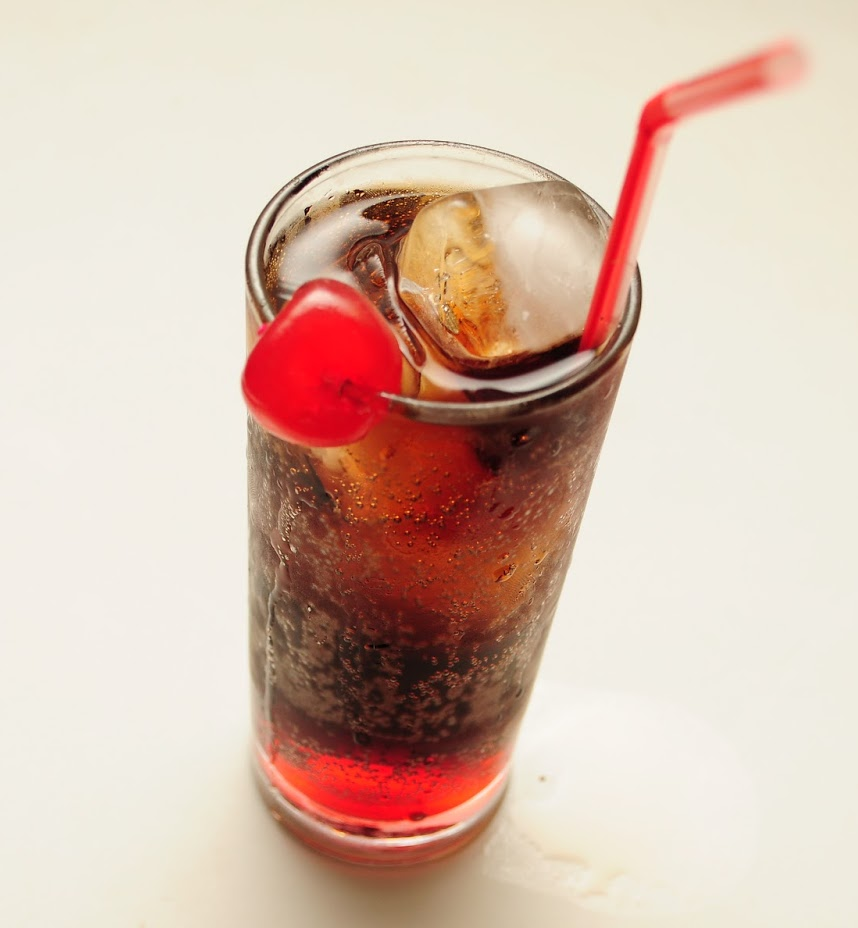
A Roy Rogers, made with cola and grenadine syrup, garnished with a maraschino cherry

- Arnold Palmer
- Diabolo
- Freddie Bartholomew
- Roy Rogers
- Tortuga
- Virgin Mary
- Virgin colada
- Shirley Temple

== List of traditional non-alcoholic mixed drinks ==
- Aam panna
- Aguas frescas
- Aguapanela
- Apfelschorle
- Atole
- Baesuk
- Bandrek
- Bandung
- Barley water
- Black Cow
- Brown Cow
- Chalap
- Champurrado
- Champús
- Chapman
- Chass
- Chicha morada
- Cholado
- Coffee Milk
- Chai
- Egg cream
- Falooda
- Hwachae
- Janda pulang
- Jindallae hwachae
- Lassi
- Lemonade
- Licuado
- Limeade
- Lime Rickey
- Mattha
- Milkshake
- Mocochinchi
- Mote con huesillo
- Peanut punch
- Sharbat
- Shikanji
- Smoothie
- Soda gembira
- Subak hwachae
- Sujeonggwa
- Switchel
- Tereré
- Thadal
- Yuja hwachae

== See also ==
- Health shake
- Punch (drink)
- Soft drink
- Spritzer § Non-alcoholic spritzer
- Temperance bar
