= Cuban sunset =

Tiki drink

- Type: Mixed drink
- Ingredients: 4.5 cl (3 parts) rum (preferably white rum); 9 cl (6 parts) carbonated lime soda; 4 cl (2 parts) lemonade; 4 cl (2 parts) guava nectar; 2 cl (1.5 parts) grenadine syrup; Garnish with lemon slice
- Standard drinkware: Highball glass
- Standard garnish: Lemon slice
- Served: on the rocks, poured over ice
- Preparation: Fill highball (tall) glass with ice. Mix lime soda, lemonade, guava nectar, and grenadine syrup together to form a mixture. Pour rum into glasses over ice, then evenly layer the guava mixture over the rum. Mix as desired. Garnish with a half-slice of lemon.

A Cuban sunset is cocktail made from rum and a mixture of lemonade, lime soda, guava nectar, and grenadine syrup.

The drink is made from rum and a mixture of lime soda, lemonade, guava nectar, and grenadine syrup. It originated in either Havana or Varadero as a variety of a traditional Cuban guava-based drink. In Cuba, the drink is commonly served (along with either a Cubata or Mojito) as a pre-dinner drink. The Cuban variety of the cocktail commonly uses extra guava nectar in place of grenadine syrup, and the drink normally contains Havana Club rum. Outside of Cuba, many recipes call for the use of Bacardi White Rum.

== See also ==
- List of cocktails
