= Waterloo Sparkling Water =

Sparkling water beverage company

- Type: Sparkling water
- Country of origin: Austin, Texas, United States
- Introduced: 2017; 8 years ago
- Website: drinkwaterloo.com

Waterloo Sparkling Water is a beverage company specializing in flavored sparkling water. It was founded in 2017 and is based in Austin, Texas.

In 2024, the company benefited from the rise in popularity of mocktails. It partnered with Guy Fieri to launch three new mocktail flavors.
