= Mendelssohns =

Bar in Portland, Oregon, U.S.

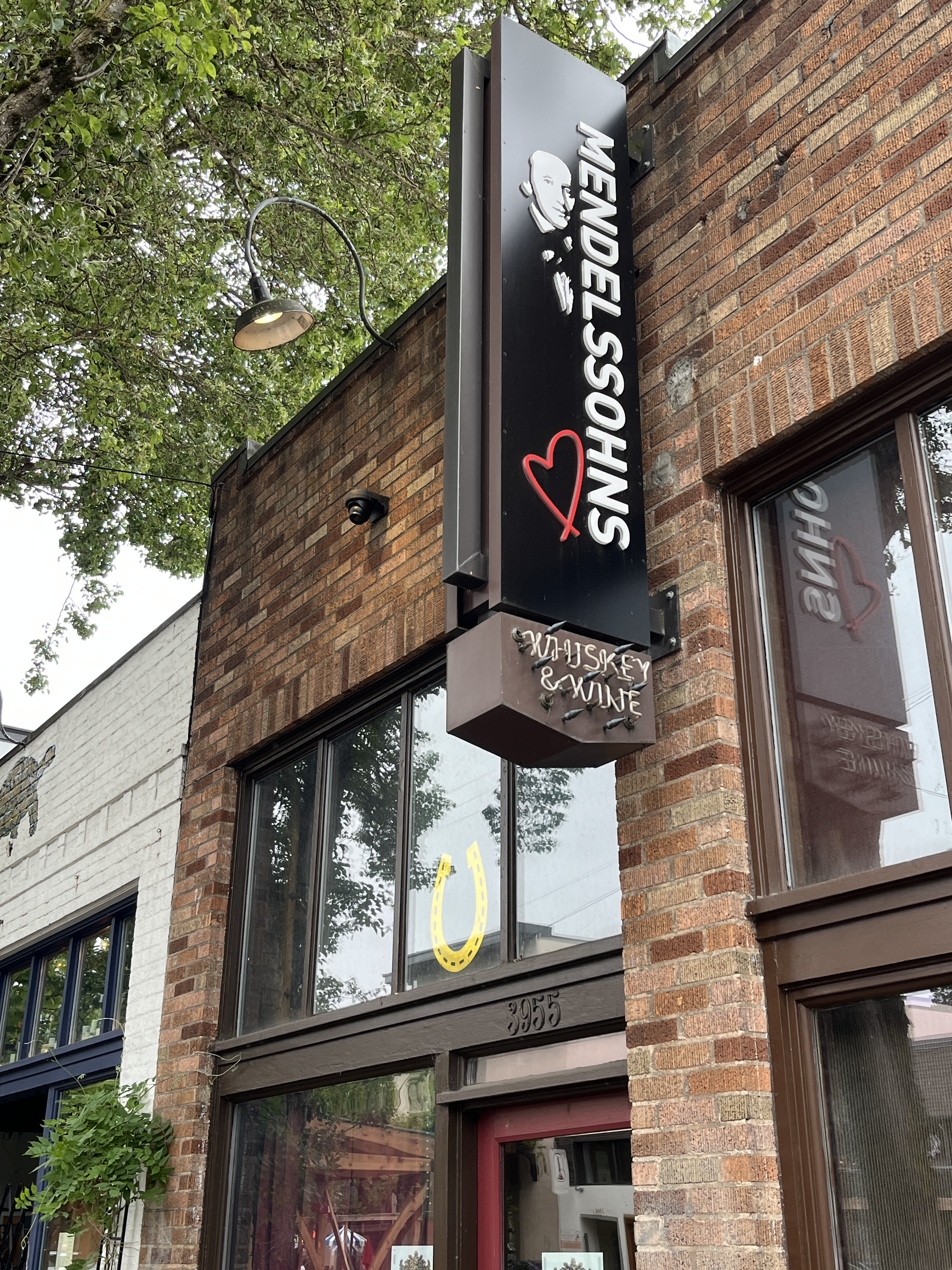
- The bar's exterior, 2025
- Interactive map of Mendelssohns

Restaurant information
- Established: June 2022
- Owner: Lisa Lipton
- Location: 3955 North Mississippi Avenue, Portland, Multnomah, Oregon, 97227, United States
- Coordinates: 45.5517°N 122.6758°W
- Website: mendelssohnspdx.com

Mendelssohns (also known as MendelssohnsPDX, or Mendelssohn's) is a bar in Portland, Oregon. Established in 2022, the classical music-themed business was named one of the best bars in the U.S. by Esquire in 2023.

== Description ==
The classical music-themed bar Mendelssohns operates on Mississippi Avenue, in the north Portland part of the Boise neighborhood. Willamette Week has described Mendelssohns as a "narrow, industrial space". The bar hosts Operaoke (opera karaoke). Among drinks are: the Red Mendelssohn, which is a blood-orange manhattan named after the 1720 Stradivarius violin that belonged to members of the Mendelssohn family in the early 20th century and inspired the 1998 film The Red Violin; the Bach Talk (Dirty martini); and the I Play the Fifth (tequila sunrise).

== History ==
Lisa Lipton opened the bar in June 2022. It has been described as the city's first classical music-themed bar. Mendelssohns was named one of the best bars in the U.S. by Esquire in 2023.
