= Roy Rogers (disambiguation) =

Roy Rogers (1911–1998) was an American singing cowboy actor.

Roy Rogers may also refer to:

- Roy Rogers Restaurants, restaurant chain
- Roy Rogers (drink), a non-alcoholic mixed drink
- Roy Rogers (basketball), American former NBA basketball player and assistant coach
- Roy Rogers (guitarist), American slide guitarist
- "Roy Rogers", a song by Elton John from the album Goodbye Yellow Brick Road
- "Roy Rogers McFreely", an episode of American Dad!
