= Roy Rogers (drink) =

Non-alcoholic mixed drink of cola and grenadine syrup

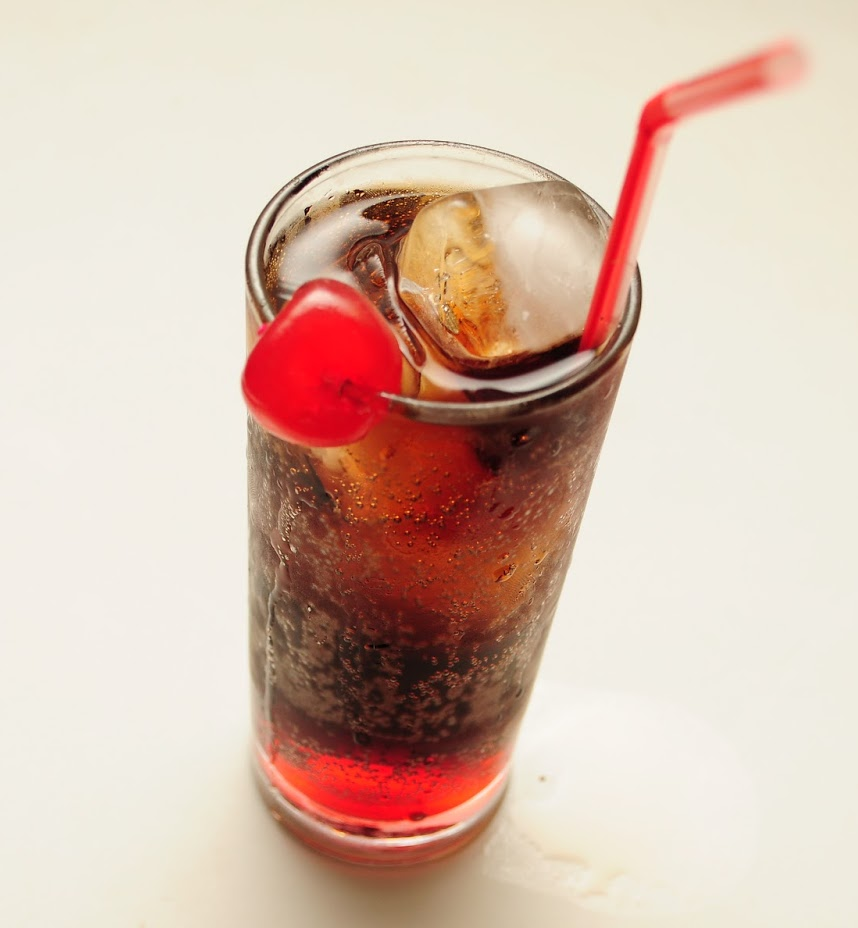
- Type: Non-alcoholic mixed drink
- Ingredients: Cola and grenadine
- Standard garnish: Maraschino cherry

A Roy Rogers is a non-alcoholic mixed drink made with cola and grenadine syrup, and traditionally garnished with a maraschino cherry.

The drink originated in the 1940s and is named after American actor and singer Roy Rogers (1911–1998), who was popular at the time. It was likely named after Rogers because he did not drink alcohol.

The Roy Rogers is similar to the Shirley Temple, which uses ginger ale and/or lemon-lime soda instead of cola. Colas traditionally have more carbonation than ginger ale or lemon-lime sodas. The Roy Rogers was reportedly sold as a boy's alternative to the Shirley Temple in the 1950s and 1960s. Despite cola being traditionally more popular than ginger ale or lemon-lime sodas, Shirley Temples remain more popular than Roy Rogers, likely due to marketing popularizing the Temple drink.

== See also ==
- Arnold Palmer – Drink made of iced tea and lemonade
- Cherry cola – Soft drink
- List of non-alcoholic mixed drinks
- Queen Mary – Blend of beer, grenadine & maraschino cherries
