= Tequila sunrise =

Alcoholic cocktail

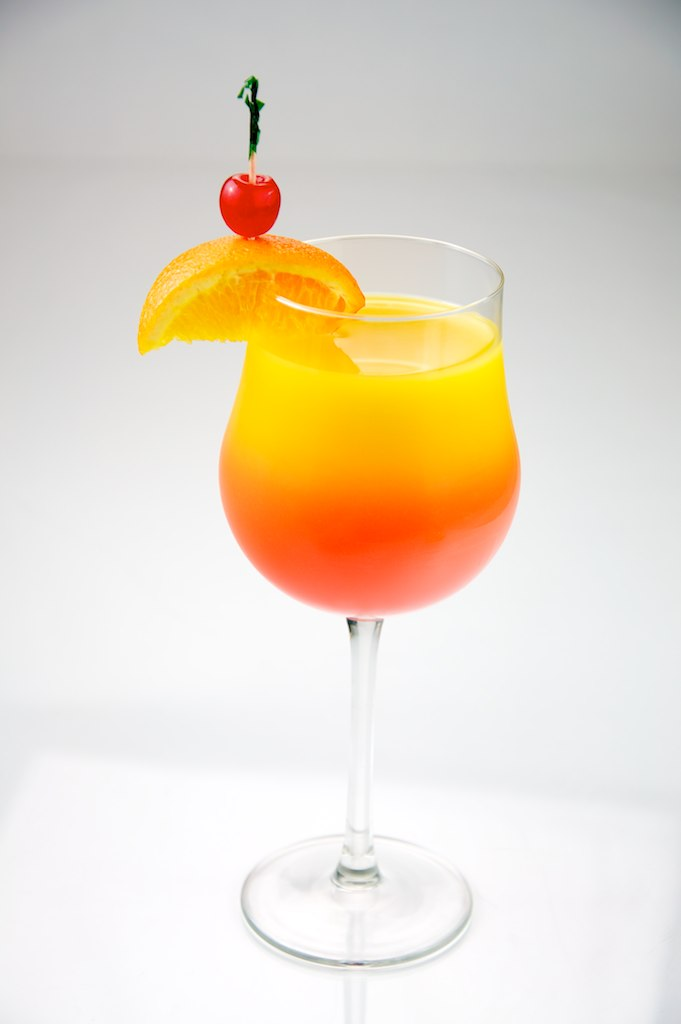
- A tequila sunrise demonstrating its resemblance to an inverted sunrise, in a stemware rather than the usual collins glass
- Type: Mixed drink
- Ingredients: 45 ml tequila; 90 ml fresh orange juice; 15 ml grenadine syrup
- Base spirit: Tequila
- Website: iba-world.com/tequila-sunrise/
- Standard drinkware: Highball glass
- Standard garnish: half orange slice or orange zest
- Served: On the rocks: poured over ice
- Preparation: Pour tequila and orange juice directly into highball glass filled with ice cubes. Add the grenadine syrup to create chromatic effect (sunrise), do not stir.

The tequila sunrise is a cocktail made of tequila, orange juice, and grenadine syrup. The drink is served unmixed in a tall glass. The modern drink originates from Sausalito, California, in the early 1970s after an earlier iteration created in the 1930s in Phoenix, Arizona. The cocktail is named for its appearance when served—with gradations of color resembling an inverted sunrise.

== History ==
The original tequila sunrise contained tequila, crème de cassis, lime juice, and soda water. It was created at the Arizona Biltmore Hotel by Gene Sulit in the 1930s or 1940s.

The more popular modern version of the cocktail contains tequila, orange juice, and grenadine, and was created by Bobby Lozoff and Billy Rice in the early 1970s while they were working as young bartenders at the Trident in Sausalito, California north of San Francisco. At a party at the Trident organized by Bill Graham to kick off the Rolling Stones' 1972 tour in America, Mick Jagger had one of the cocktails, liked it, and he and his entourage started drinking them. They later ordered them all across America, even dubbing the tour itself their "cocaine and tequila sunrise tour".

According to Lozoff, at the time the Trident was the largest outlet for tequila in the United States, and in 1973 Jose Cuervo picked up on the new drink as a marketing opportunity and put the recipe for the new drink on the back of their bottles of tequila, and promoted it in other ways. Later that same year, the Eagles recorded a song called "Tequila Sunrise" for their Desperado album as the drink was soaring in popularity. In 1988, a successful film titled Tequila Sunrise was released, starring Michelle Pfeiffer, Mel Gibson, and Kurt Russell and directed by Robert Towne.

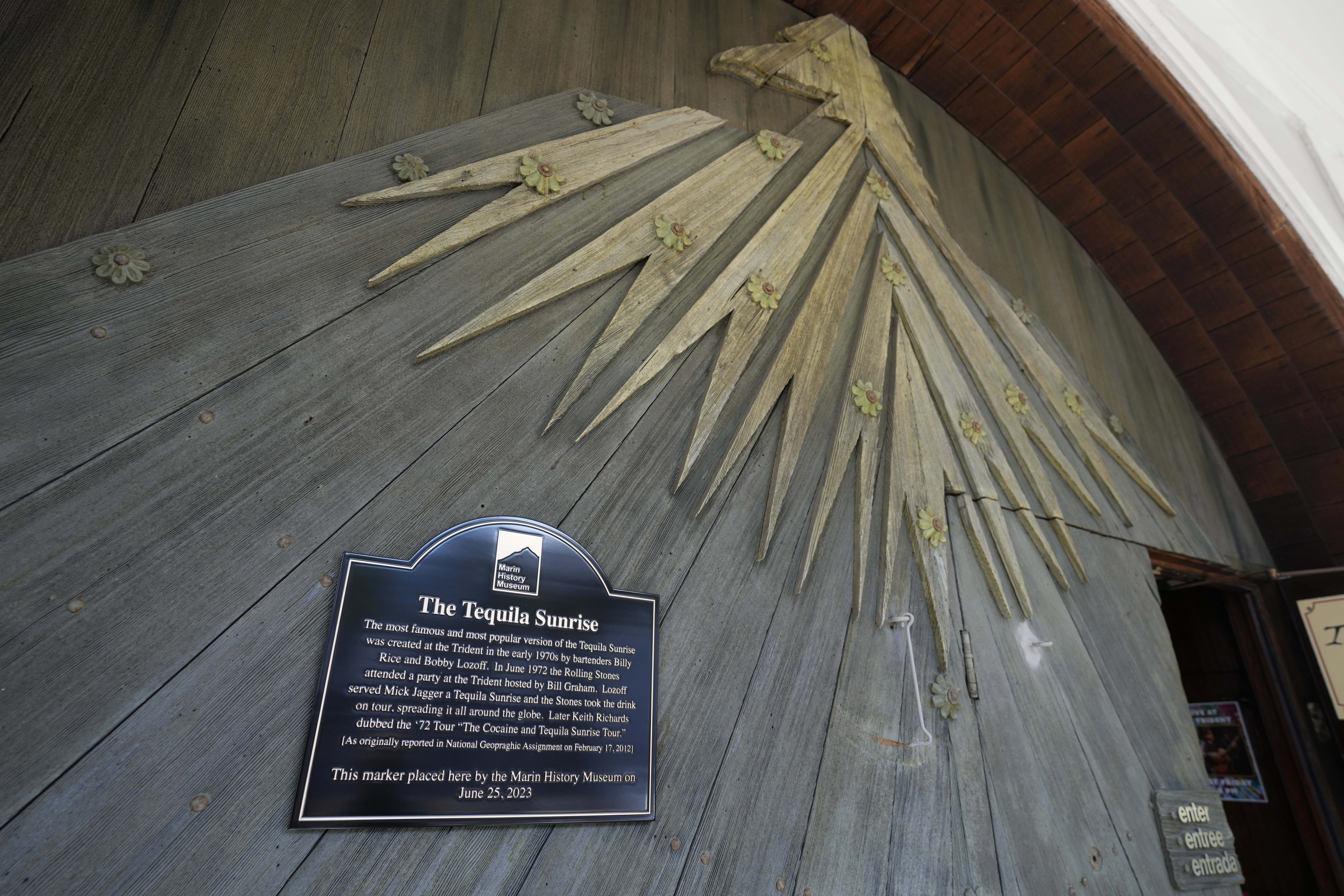
Trident Tequila Sunrise Historical Marker

On June 25, 2023, the Marin History Museum placed a historical marker at the Trident Restaurant to commemorate the Rolling Stones party and the re-interpretation of the Tequila Sunrise there. On April 14, 2025, Lozoff died in Hawaii. He was 77 years old.

Other recipes with a similar appearance have been named in imitation of this: for instance the Caribbean sunrise is made with vodka and pineapple juice replacing the tequila and orange juice. A mocktail version can be made by replacing the tequila with a non-alcoholic substitute such as soda water or a combination of grape juice and lime juice.

== Preparation and serving ==
The tequila sunrise is considered a long drink and is usually served in a collins or highball glass. The International Bartender Association has designated this cocktail as an IBA Official Cocktail.

The drink is made by pouring in tequila, then the orange juices, and grenadine last. The drink's signature look is created by adding the grenadine without it mixing with the other ingredients. A spoon may be used to guide the syrup down the glass wall to the bottom with minimal mixing. Ice may be added before the tequila, or chilled orange juice may be used.

== See also ==
- List of cocktails
- Queen Mary (beer cocktail)
