= Ward 8 (cocktail) =

Cocktail made with whiskey and fruit juices

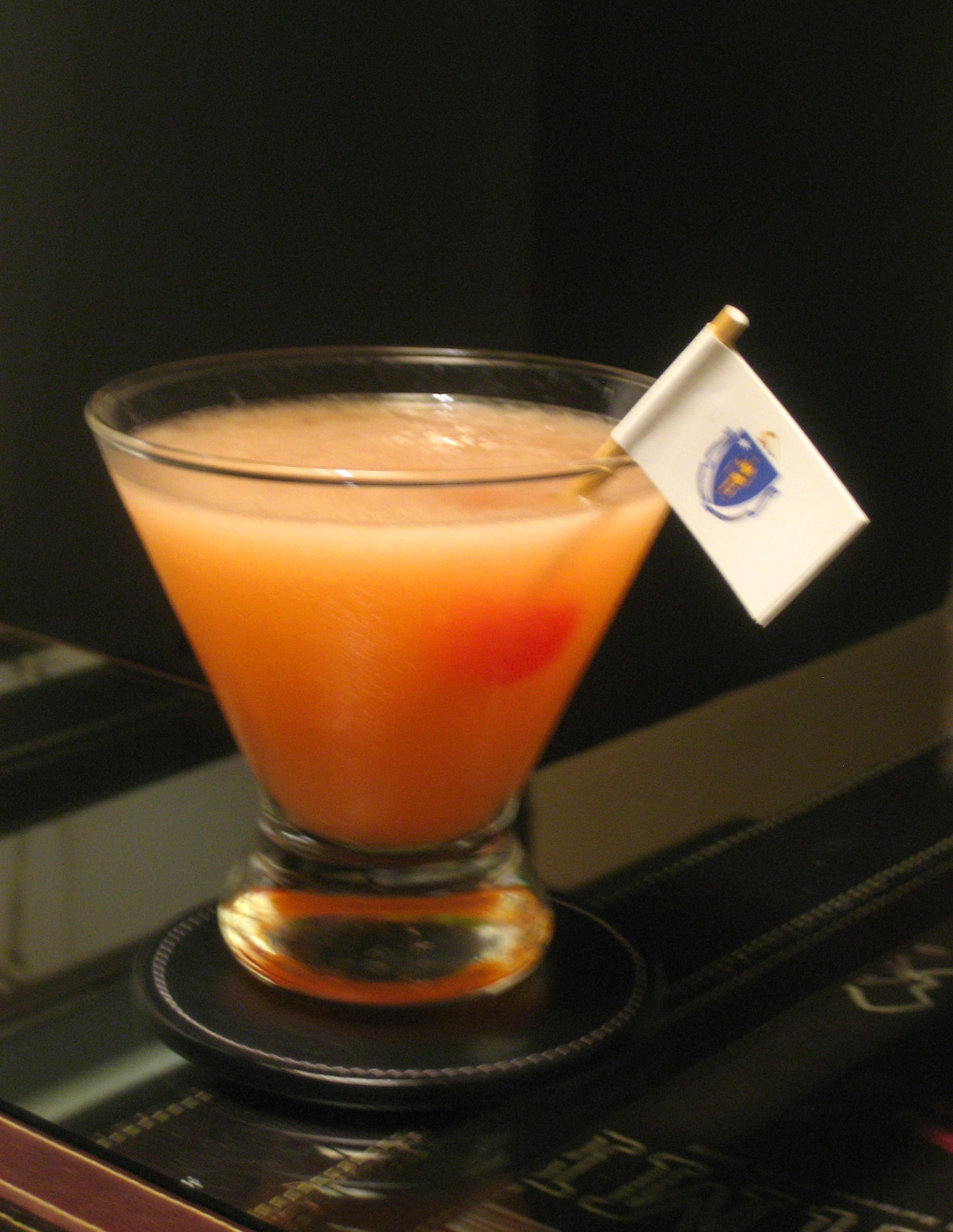
- Type: Cocktail
- Ingredients: 2 oz rye whiskey; 1/2 oz lemon juice; 1/2 oz orange juice; 1 teaspoon grenadine
- Base spirit: Whiskey
- Standard drinkware: Cocktail glass
- Standard garnish: maraschino cherry

The Ward 8 or Ward Eight is a cocktail originating in 1898 in Boston, Massachusetts, at the bar of the Gilded Age restaurant Locke-Ober.

In 1898 Democratic political czar Martin M. Lomasney hoped to capture a seat in the state's legislature, the General Court of Massachusetts. Lomasney held considerable power in the city for nearly 50 years. The story goes that the drink was created to honor his election, and the city's Ward 8 which historically delivered him a winning margin. In 1915 the Santa Clara Company registered "Ward 8" as a trademark with the United States Patent Office claiming use since November 1912 and published a notice that they would prosecute any infringement. During prohibition the Daily Boston Globe reported that the drink was believed to have originated at the "old" and abandoned Quincy House. Competing but unfounded myths abound in print and on the Internet. One story reports that it originated in New York in an area known for political corruption, and another that the cocktail is a traditional drink of the Scots Guards.

== Ingredients and preparation ==
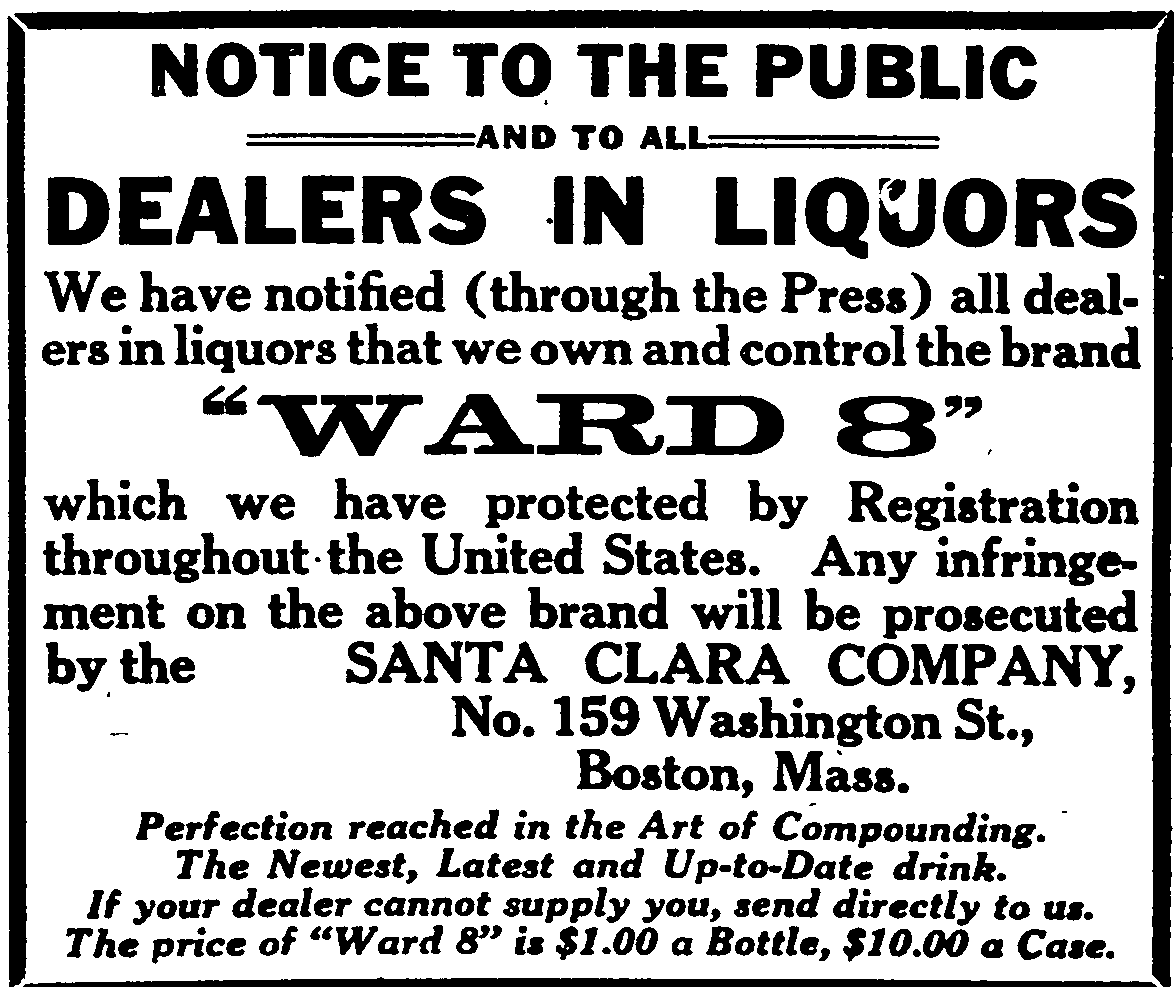
Notice from the Santa Clara Company. The Boston Globe, 1914.

Like the story of its creation, the Ward 8 cocktail has several variations. Various recipes call for blended whiskey, bourbon, rye and even single-malt scotch. Some recipes call for lemon juice, lime juice, no juice, grenadine, sour mix and gomme syrup. The Santa Clara Company trademark described their product as "Compounds of Whisky, Grenadine-Syrup, Rock-Candy Syrup, and Lime-Juice."

Following the end of prohibition, Locke-Ober reopened its bar using this recipe:

- 2 ounces rye whiskey
- 1/2 ounce fresh lemon juice
- 1/2 ounce fresh orange juice
- 1 teaspoon grenadine
- Maraschino cherry (optional)

Shake the rye whiskey, lemon juice, orange juice and grenadine with ice, then strain into a chilled cocktail glass. Garnish with a maraschino cherry, if desired. Originally the drink was decorated with a small paper Massachusetts flag.

== See also ==
- List of cocktails
