= Arnold Palmer (drink) =

Drink made of iced tea and lemonade

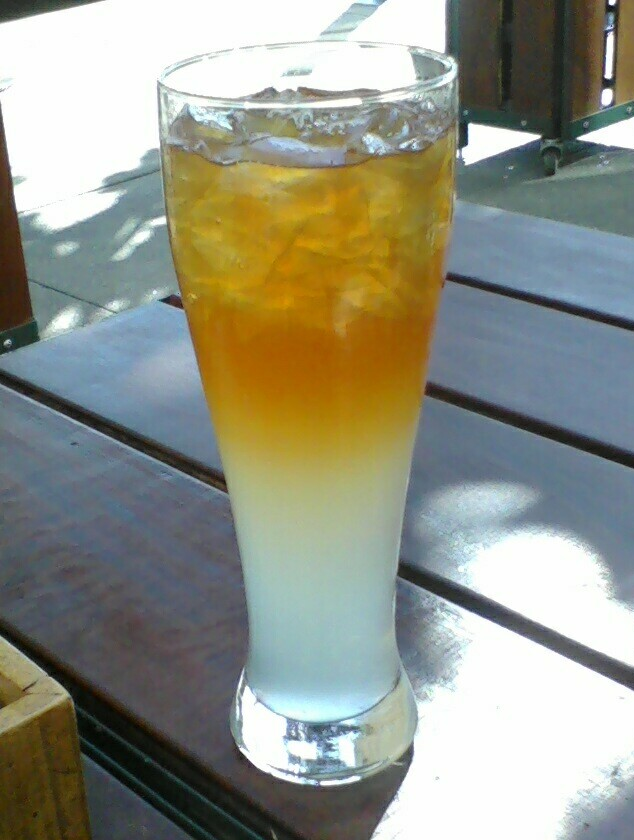
- Type: Non-alcoholic mixed drink
- Ingredients: Iced tea and lemonade

The Arnold Palmer is a non-alcoholic mixed drink that combines iced tea and lemonade. The drink was named after American professional golfer Arnold Palmer, who was known to often request and drink this beverage combination; some attribute the invention of the beverage to the golfer.

There are two alcoholic cocktail versions, one the John Daly, which has vodka, and the other the Lee Trevino or Juan Daly, which has tequila. MillerCoors began marketing and distributing a commercially available malt-based version of the beverage under the Arnold Palmer Spiked name in early 2018.

== History ==
In 2012, an ESPN 30 for 30 Shorts documentary was produced on the drink, featuring Palmer, beverage experts, a group of PGA golfers and the comedian Will Arnett discussing the drink's history and popularity. In the film, Palmer attributes the spreading of the drink's name to an incident in which a woman copied his ordering the drink at lunch after a long day of designing a golf course in Palm Springs, California, during the late 1960s, saying "I'll have that Arnold Palmer drink, too." Palmer preferred three parts unsweetened tea to one part lemonade, although the mass-produced version sold by Arizona Beverage Company uses and advertises a half and half ratio.

According to a waitress at Augusta National Golf Club, Palmer ordered his namesake drink by saying, "I'll have a Mr. Palmer." When Palmer visited the Latrobe Country Club in his hometown, the staff at the snack shack served the beverage to him or his wife, Kit, without prompting. "Mr. Palmer should never have to order the drink named after him," wrote a former snack shack employee about the club's rules.

The first mention of the beverage nationally was in the Rolling Stone 1997 "Hot Issue". Screenwriter Scott Alexander said it was the new "hot drink" and called it the "half-and-half." Alexander wrote, "It's half-iced tea and half-lemonade. At any Hollywood lunch, everyone orders it."

== Mass-produced versions ==
The drink has been sold under the Arnold Palmer trademark via a licensing arrangement with Innovative Flavors since 2001. Arizona Beverage Company began marketing and selling the beverage with Palmer's picture and signature on the bottle in 2002 and has handled distribution ever since. The line has expanded to include various flavors including Green Tea, Southern Style Sweet Tea and Pink Lemonade, Zero Calorie, Strawberry, Peach, Mango and Natural Energy. Lemonade combined with iced tea is also sold without the Arnold Palmer trademark by other companies, such as Nestea, Lipton Brisk, Honest Tea (as Half and Half), Nantucket Nectars (as Half and Half), Country Time, Sweet Leaf, XINGtea, Snapple, and Peace Iced Tea (as Caddyshack). It has 23 mg of caffeine per 23 oz drink. In 2021, Chick-fil-A began selling its own version marketed as "Sunjoy."

== Arnold Palmer variations ==
The drink has many variations, with and without alcohol. Non-alcoholic variations include the Winnie Palmer (made with sweet tea and lemonade), the Green Tea Arnold Palmer (made with frozen lemonade concentrate), and the Red Palmer (made with iced tea and cranberry juice).

== See also ==
- List of lemon dishes and drinks
- List of lemonade topics
- Queen Mary (beer cocktail)
- Roy Rogers (drink)
- Shirley Temple (drink)
