= Buena Vista Cafe =

Café in San Francisco, US

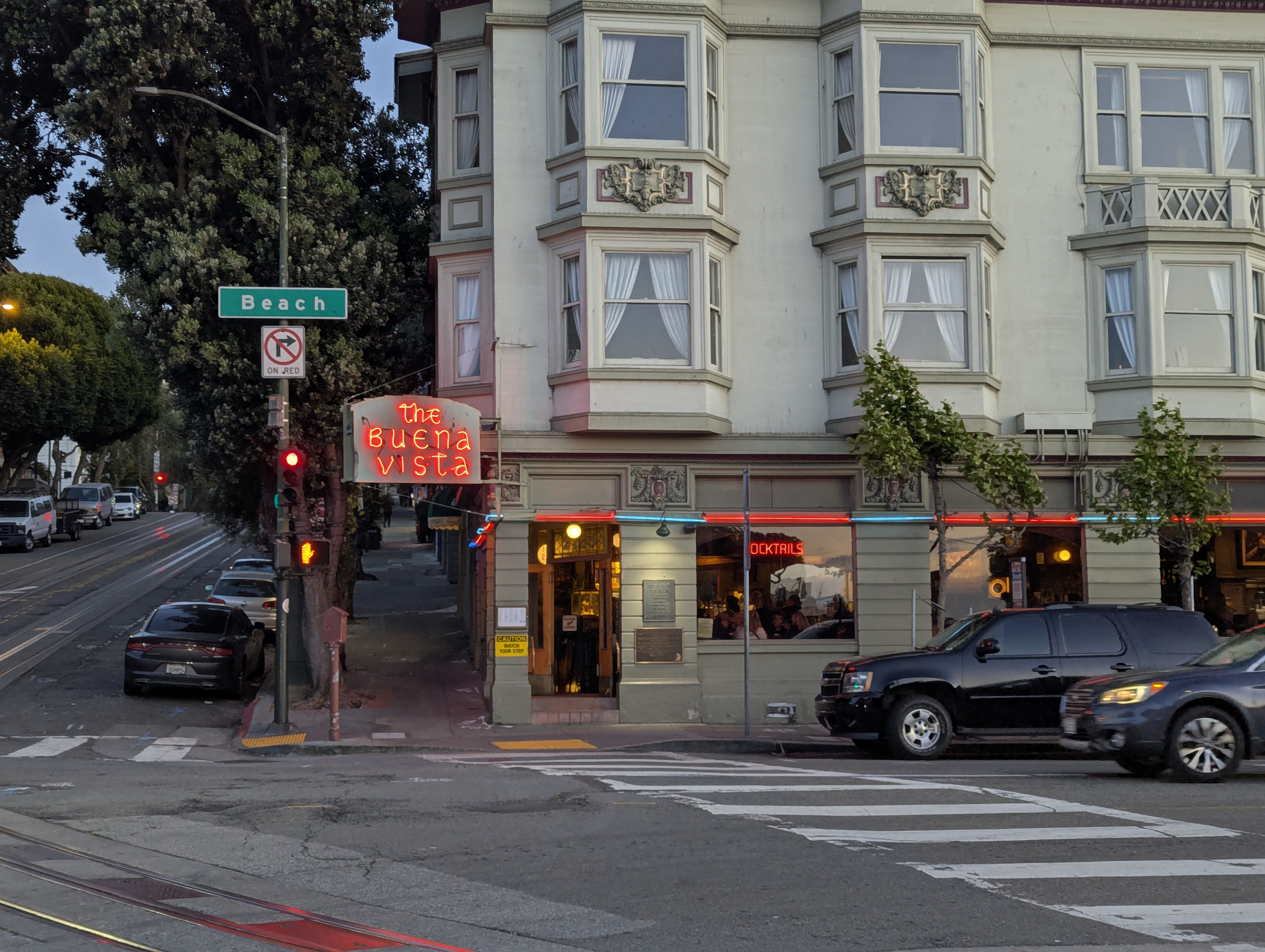
- Street view from north in 2025
- Interactive map of Buena Vista Cafe
- Location in the United States Location in California

Restaurant information
- Established: 1916; 110 years ago
- Location: 2765 Hyde Street (at Beach St.), San Francisco, California, U.S.
- Coordinates: 37.8065°N 122.4207°W
- Website: thebuenavista.com

The Buena Vista is a café in San Francisco, California, credited with introducing Irish coffee to the United States in 1952. The Buena Vista Café originally opened in 1916 when the first floor of a boardinghouse was converted into a saloon. The current owners also operated the Trident in Sausalito, which closed on December 31, 2025.

== Irish coffee ==
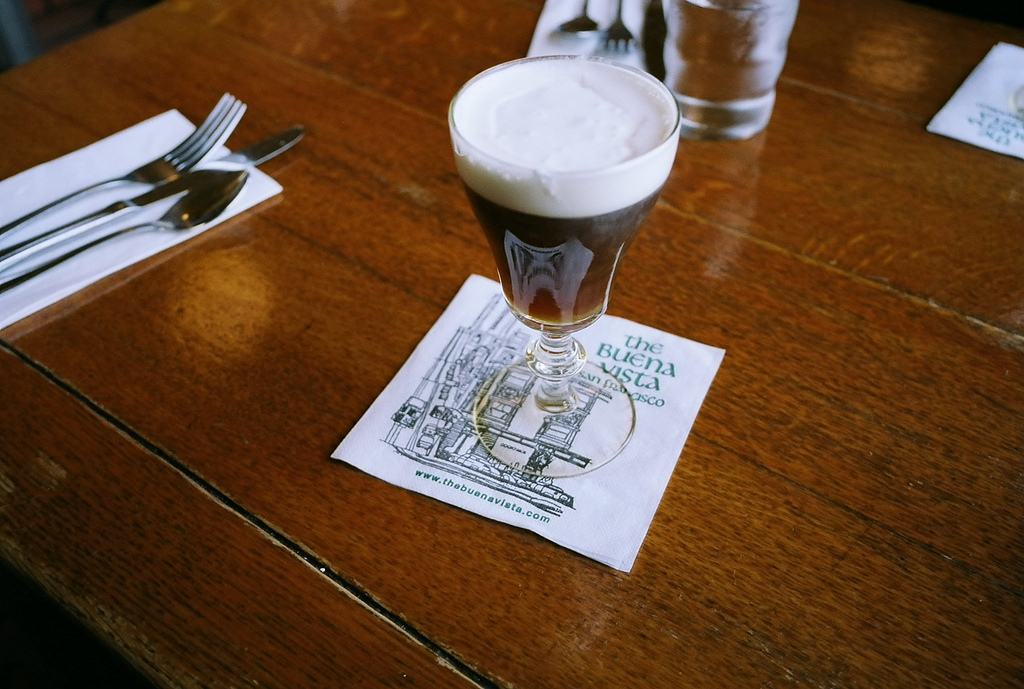
Irish coffee at the Buena Vista

Stanton Delaplane, a travel writer for the San Francisco Chronicle, drank an Irish coffee at the Shannon Airport while on a trip to Ireland. Some time later, Stanton Delaplane along with owner Jack Koeppler of the Buena Vista Café in San Francisco, tried to recreate this drink.

Delaplane and Koeppler worked for hours, mixing and sampling different versions of the drink until they achieved the results that they were looking for, and almost passed out in the process. The two men solicited the advice of the mayor of San Francisco at that time, since he was also a prominent dairy owner. The method for floating the cream on top of the coffee was suggested to them by mayor George Christopher, who told them that the cream should be aged at least 48 hours in order that it would be more apt to float atop the coffee.

The Buena Vista Café began serving their Irish Coffee drink on November 10, 1952. Also, Stanton Delaplane helped to popularize the drink by mentioning it frequently in his travel column. The Buena Vista Café has served, by its count, more than 30 million drinks of their signature Irish Coffee.
