= Pepsi Wild Cherry =

Cherry-flavored soft drink

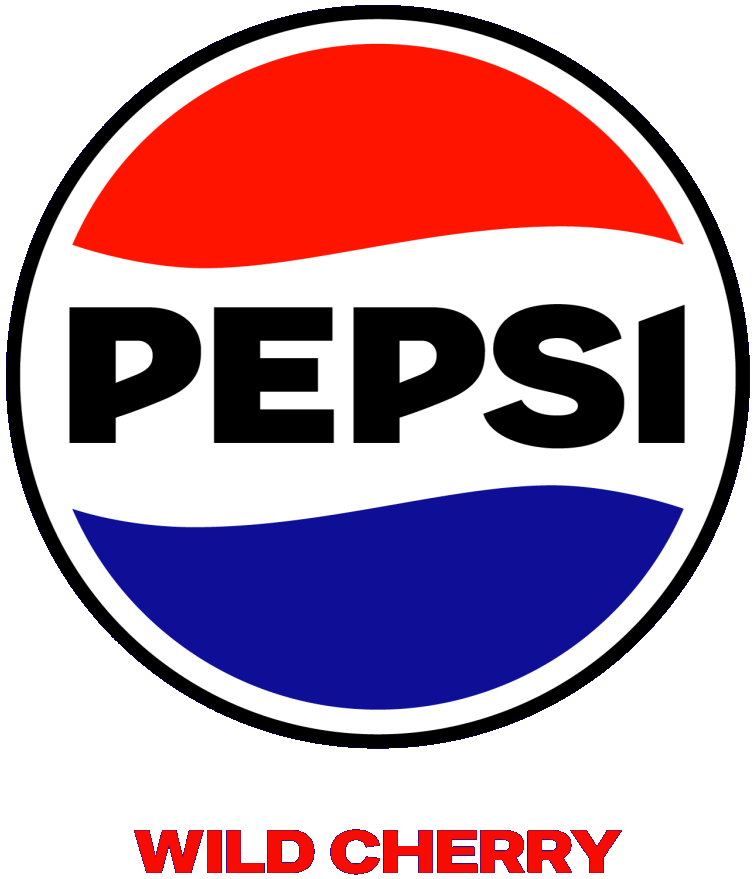

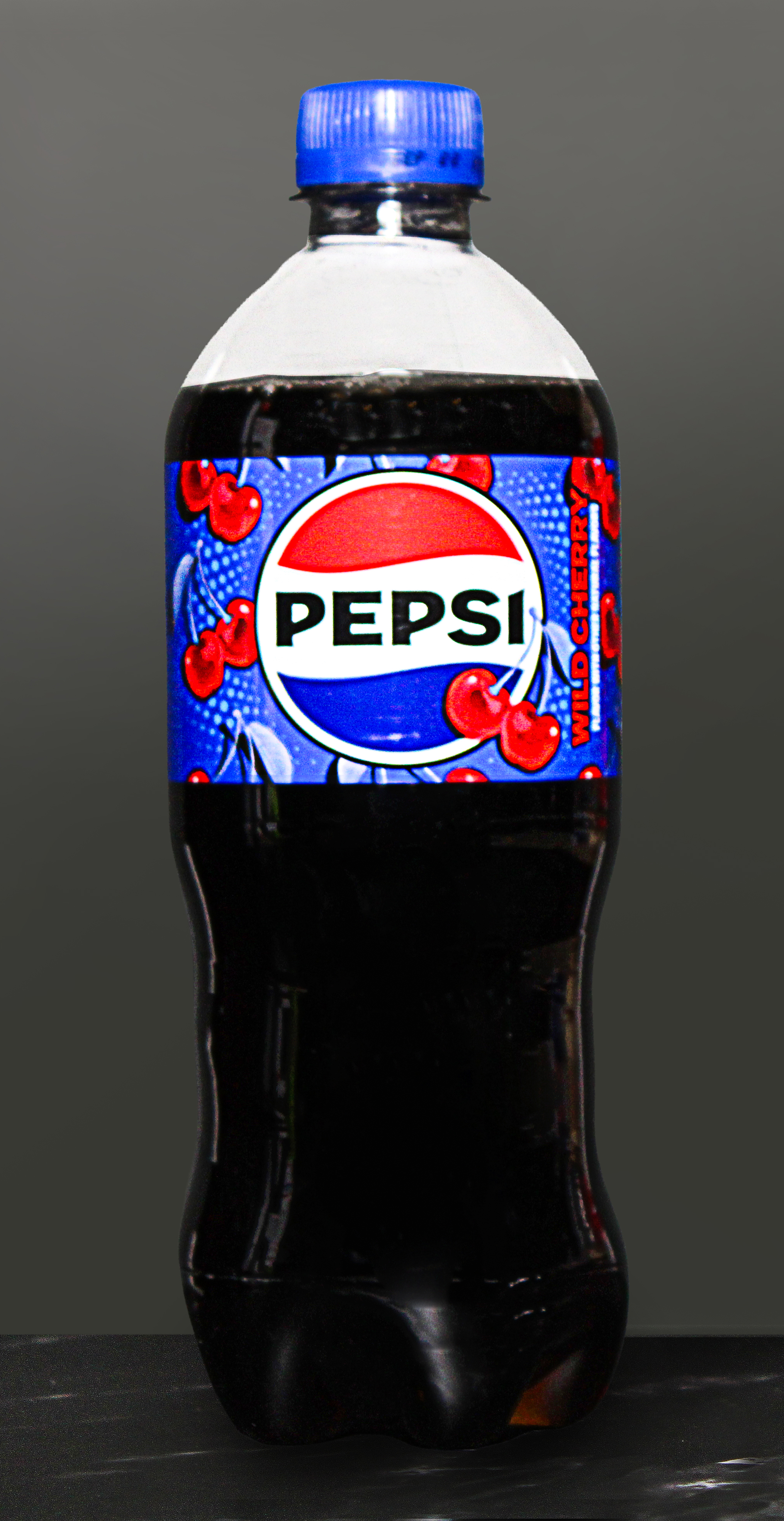
- Type: Cherry cola
- Manufacturer: PepsiCo
- Origin: United States
- Introduced: 1988; 38 years ago (Note: In 2017, a "Zero Sugar" version was launched.)
- Variants: Diet Pepsi Wild Cherry; Pepsi Zero Sugar Wild Cherry; Pepsi Wild Cherry & Cream; Pepsi Wild Cherry & Cream Zero Sugar
- Website: pepsi.com/wild-cherry

Pepsi Wild Cherry is a cherry-flavored cola first introduced in 1988 by PepsiCo. Two sugar-free versions are also available, with zero calories, named Diet Pepsi Wild Cherry and Pepsi Zero Sugar Wild Cherry (based on Diet Pepsi and Pepsi Zero Sugar respectively). A number of variants have also been released. Other than the drink, PepsiCo also market the flavor as a lip balm.

== History ==
In response to the successful launch of Cherry Coke in 1985, Pepsi extensively test-marketed a formulation simply called "Cherry Pepsi" in Canada from 1985 to 1987. In the United States, Cherry Cola Slice was introduced as part of the line in 1986 and was offered until the launch of Pepsi Wild Cherry. Pepsi's product and Coca-Cola's have been competitors since the 1980s.

== Availability ==
Pepsi Wild Cherry is currently sold in the United States and Canada as a regular, permanent product, available in cans and bottles. Pepsi officially relaunched it in Canada on March 25, 2017, after five years of limited time availability. Its French name is Cerise En Folie.

The drink has also been sold in other countries around the world. In some countries a similar cherry-flavored cola under the Pepsi Max formula has been sold instead, such as in Germany.

== Derivative flavors ==
In 2010, PepsiCo released Pepsi Wild Cherry Vanilla in the United States, a limited edition flavor combining wild cherry with vanilla. It was brought back again in limited form in 2016.

In January 2025, Pepsi released a new variant of Wild Cherry flavor as part of the permanent lineup: Wild Cherry & Cream available in original and zero sugar forms.
