= The Trident (restaurant) =

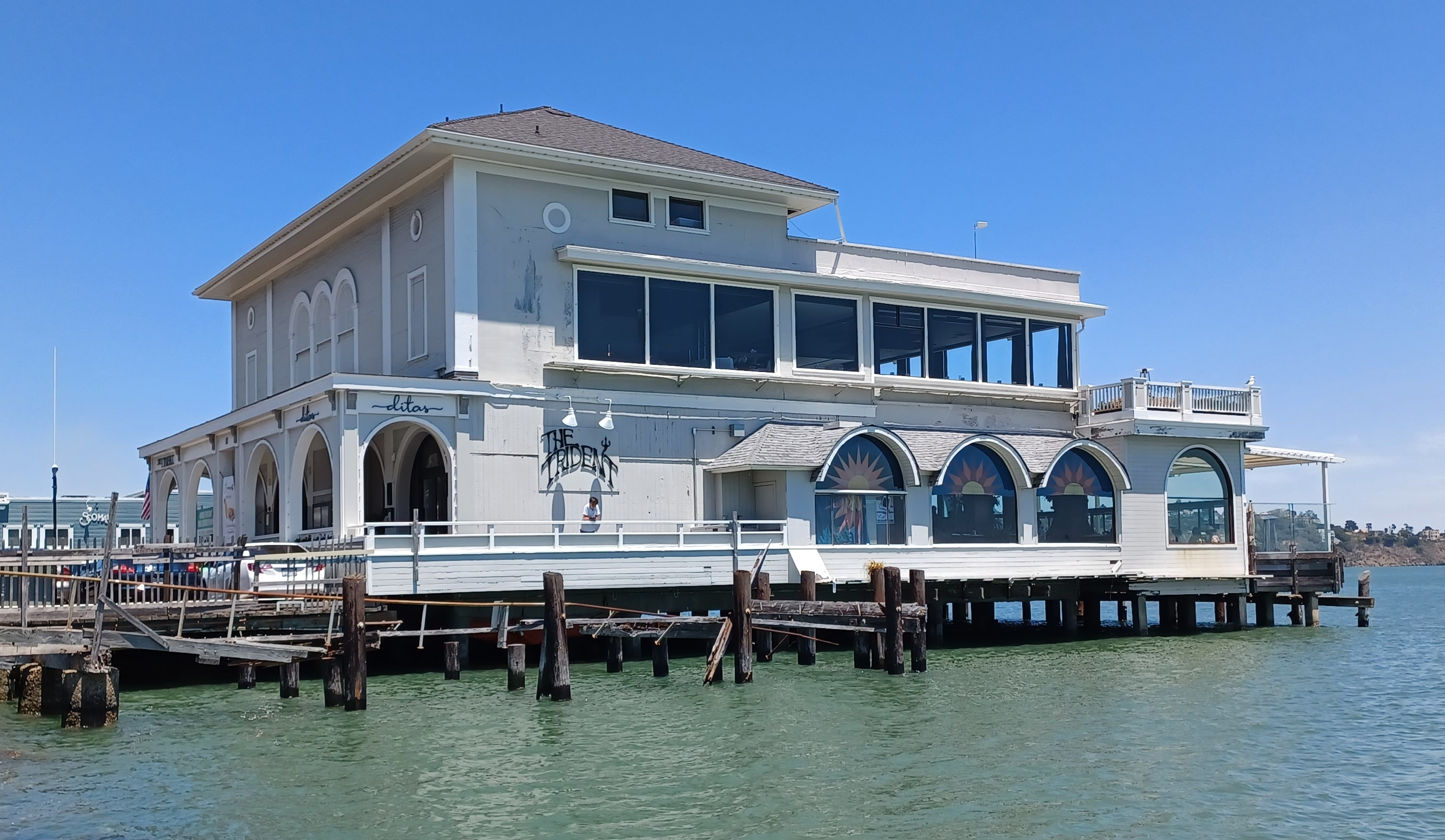
- The restaurant in 2023

- Location in San Francisco Bay Area

Restaurant information
- Established: 1966
- Closed: 2025
- Head chef: Joseph Offner
- Food type: American
- Location: 558 Bridgeway, Sausalito, Marin, California, 94965, United States
- Coordinates: 37°51′13″N 122°28′43″W
- Website: thetrident.net

The Trident was a restaurant in Sausalito, California, opened in 1966 as a bar-restaurant-music venue by the Kingston Trio. It is noted for its psychedelic murals dating to the 1960s and its ties to the music counterculture of that era. The restaurant closed at the end of 2025.

The modern version of the Tequila Sunrise cocktail was invented at the Trident in the early 1970s.

== History ==
The restaurant is located in the former 1898 home of the San Francisco Yacht Club. It housed a jazz club called the Yacht Dock when it was purchased by the Kingston Trio, who converted it into a combination live music venue and natural foods restaurant. It became the Trident in 1966.

Trident bartenders Bobby Lozoff and Billy Rice created the modern version of the Tequila Sunrise cocktail at the restaurant in 1972. It was served at a private party there organized by Bill Graham to kick off the Rolling Stones' 1972 tour in America. Mick Jagger had one, liked it, and he and his entourage started drinking them. They later ordered them all across America, even dubbing the tour itself their "cocaine and tequila sunrise tour".

In the 1968 action film Bullitt, the live band playing in the background of the restaurant scene with Steve McQueen and Jacqueline Bissett is Meridian West, a jazz quartet that McQueen had seen performing at The Trident and included in the movie.

During the summers of 1974, 1975 and 1976, Robin Williams worked as a dishwasher and busboy at The Trident.

The Trident closed in 1980. Shortly thereafter, Horizons opened and became a popular tourist destination until 2012, when it resumed its Trident title. The current owners also operate the Buena Vista Cafe in San Francisco.

The Trident closed permanently on New Year's Eve 2025 after declining sales and increasing costs following the COVID-19 pandemic.
