= El Presidente (cocktail) =

Cuban cocktail

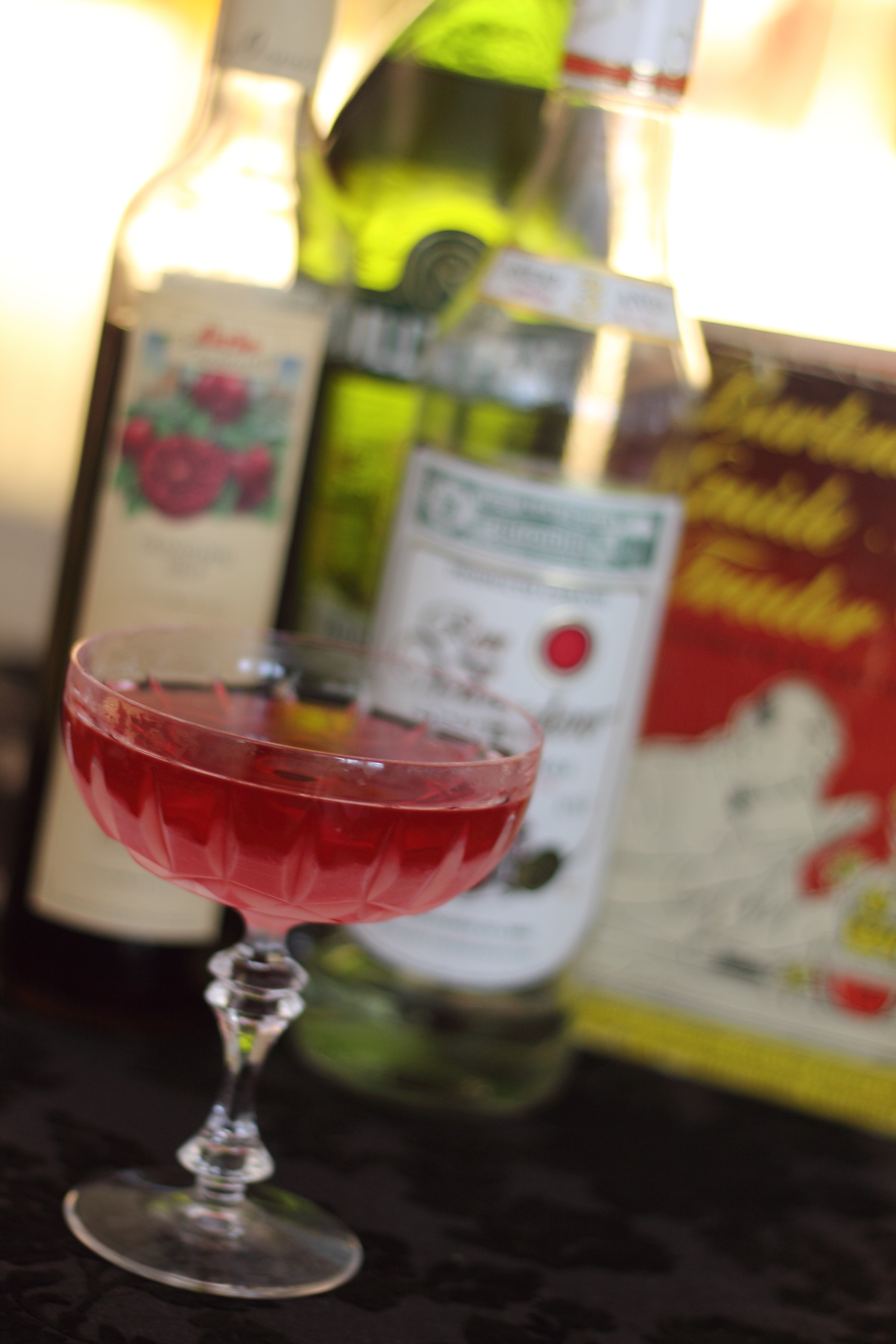
- Type: Cocktail
- Ingredients: One part white rum; One part blanc vermouth; One teaspoon curaçao; Half teaspoon grenadine (pomegranate syrup)
- Base spirit: Rum
- Standard drinkware: Cocktail glass
- Standard garnish: twist of orange peel, optional cherry
- Served: Straight up: chilled, without ice
- Preparation: Stir well with ice, then strain into glass. Garnish and serve.

The El Presidente is a Cuban cocktail made of rum, orange curaçao, vermouth, and grenadine. The original recipe calls for blanc vermouth.

Some believe it is the only bona fide classic cocktail that is supposed to use harder to find blanc vermouth (Chambéry vermouth) and is frequently mismade with dry vermouth. While variations are made using other orange liqueurs than curaçao, the drink is traditionally meant to be red in color, so blue curaçao should not be used. The red comes from red curaçao, or when paler colors are used, from the grenadine.

== History ==
The El Presidente earned its acclaim in Havana during the 1920s through the 1940s during the American Prohibition. It quickly became the preferred drink of the Cuban upper class.

There are two rival stories of who the cocktail is named after. One is Mario García Menocal, president from 1913 to 1921. The other is Gerardo Machado, who was a general and also president from 1925 to 1933.

There are also multiple claims as to the invention of the cocktail. One story is that it was American bartender Eddie Woelke, who named it after Gen. Menocal after moving to Havana. Another claim is that it was invented as early as 1915 in Cuba, 5 years before Woelke set foot on the Malecón in 1920. This premise if true is even further debated, as either being invented at the Vista Alegre (a Havana establishment frequented by Americans), or by President Menocal himself.

== Similar cocktails ==
President Machado gave Pan American Airways (Pan Am) exclusive rights to fly the Florida–Havana route. This may be the reason that Pan Am served a variation of El Presidente, known as the clipper cocktail, on their larger planes. It consisted of only gold rum, vermouth, and grenadine.

== Sources ==
- Curtis, Wayne (May. 1, 2006). El Presidente. Lost Magazine.
- Eric Felten, How's Your Drink?: Cocktails, Culture, and the Art of Drinking Well, pp. 105–108, Agate Publishing, 2009 ISBN 1572846127.
