= Zevia =

American food company

- Traded as: NYSE: ZVIA
- Industry: Beverage
- Founded: 2007; 19 years ago
- Headquarters: Los Angeles, California, U.S.
- Area served: Worldwide
- Revenue: ▲US$161 million (2025)
- Net income: ▲ −US$9.92 million (2025)
- Website: www.zevia.com

Zevia is a Los Angeles based company that produces soft drinks, organic tea, energy drinks, and mixers sweetened with stevia. All Zevia products are zero-calorie, sugar-free, gluten free, vegan, certified kosher, and certified by The Non-GMO Project. In June 2021, Zevia filed to go public with an IPO.

== Products ==
In May 2012, the product was the best selling soda in Whole Foods. By July 2013, it was the number seventeen zero-calorie or low-calorie soda in mainstream grocery stores, making it the only independent brand in the top 20. By the end of 2013, overall sales were over $60 million, and it was the 14th-best-selling diet soda. By 2014 the firm's product was available in more than 16,000 stores in the United States, including Whole Foods, Target, Kroger, Safeway, Sprouts, and other grocery and natural food stores.

In late 2013, the firm replaced their previous stevia and erythritol sweetener with a mix of stevia extract, monk fruit extract, and erythritol, a blend that they called SweetSmart. In September 2016, the company announced that all their products had been reformulated to be sweetened only with stevia.

Starting in 2016, Zevia introduced more products beyond its primary line of soft drinks. In June 2016, Zevia launched the Sparkling Water and energy drink product lines. In October 2016, Zevia unveiled its Mixers line.

In 2018, the company launched the Zevia Organic Tea line, in various tea flavors.

In December 2019, Zevia launched its Kidz line. The drinks are packaged in smaller 7.5 ounce cans that feature classic Disney characters.

Zevia claims that it was the top-selling carbonated soft drink brand on Amazon.com in 2020.

=== Product lines ===
As of 2021 Zevia has six product lines, with 37 flavors. All Zevia products are zero-calorie, sugar-free, gluten free, vegan, certified Kosher and certified by The Non GMO Project.

- Soda – Flavors include Cola, Ginger Root Beer, Creamy Root Beer, Ginger Ale, Black Cherry, Cream Soda, Cherry Cola, Dr. Zevia, Grape, Mountain Zevia, Caffeine Free Cola, Orange, Lemon Lime Twist, Grapefruit Citrus, Vanilla Cola, and Strawberry.
- Energy – Flavors include Raspberry Lime, Mango Ginger, Grapefruit, and Kola.
- Organic Tea – Flavors include Black Tea, Green Tea, Black Tea Raspberry, Black Tea Peach, Black Tea Lemon, Earl Grey Tea Blood Orange, Caffeine Free Hibiscus Tea Passionfruit, and Caffeine Free Black Tea Lemon.
- Mixer – Flavors include Ginger Beer, Tonic Water, and Lemon Lime with Bitters.
- Kidz – Flavors include Watermelon, Cran-Raspberry, Strawberry Lemonade, Fruit Punch, Orange Cream, and Fizzy Apple.
- Sparkling Water – Flavors include Blackberry, and Cucumber Lemon.
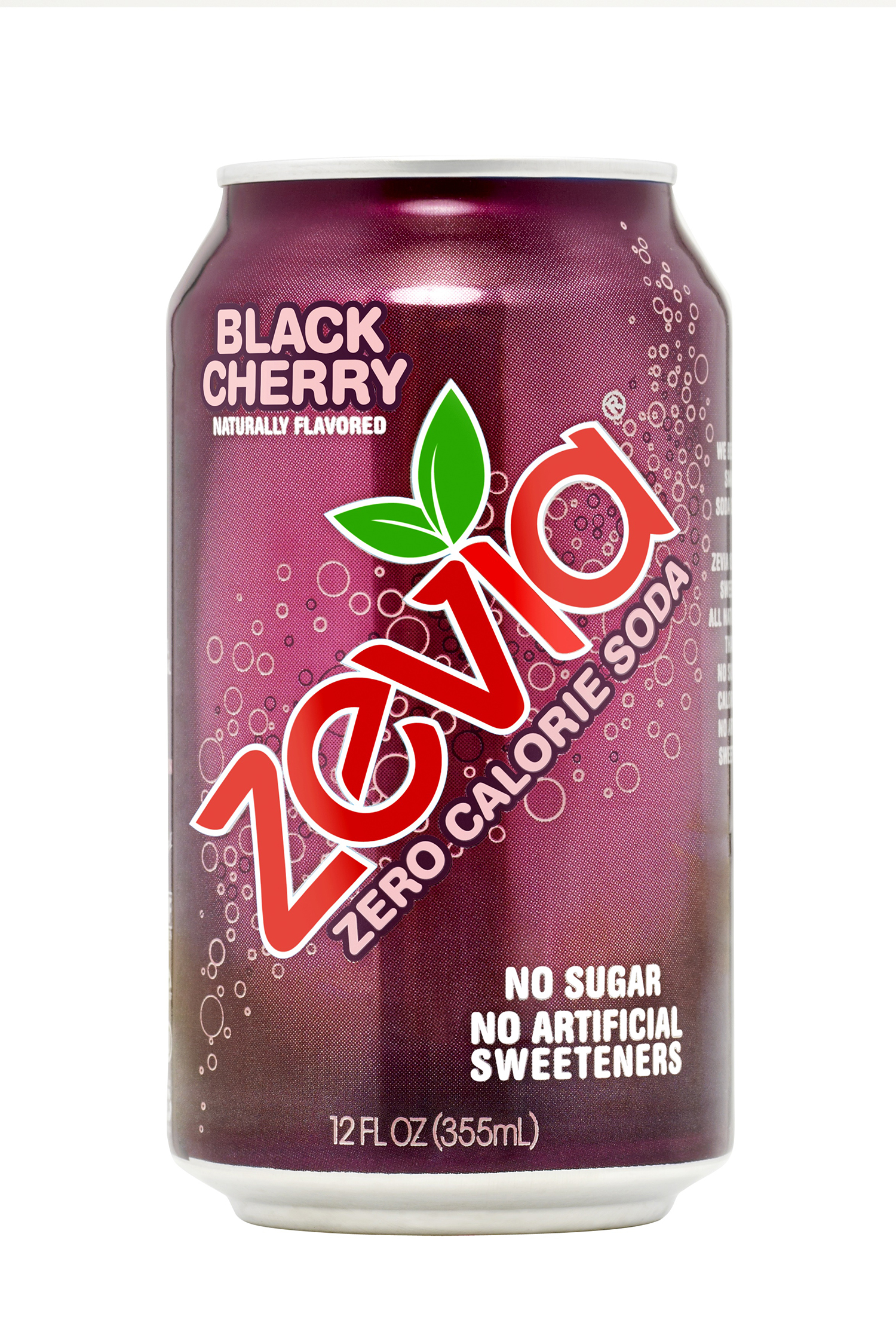
Black Cherry

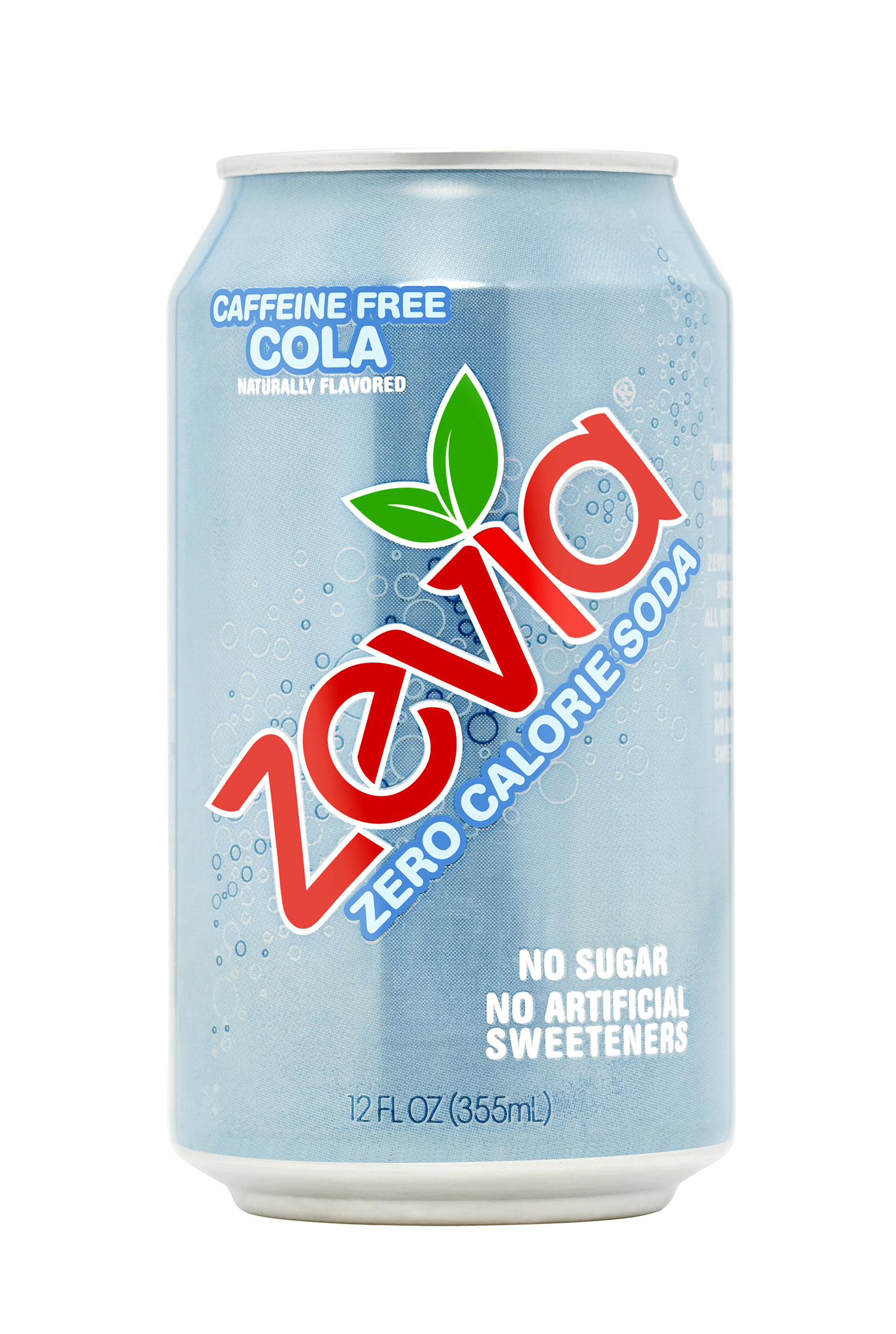
Caffeine Free Cola

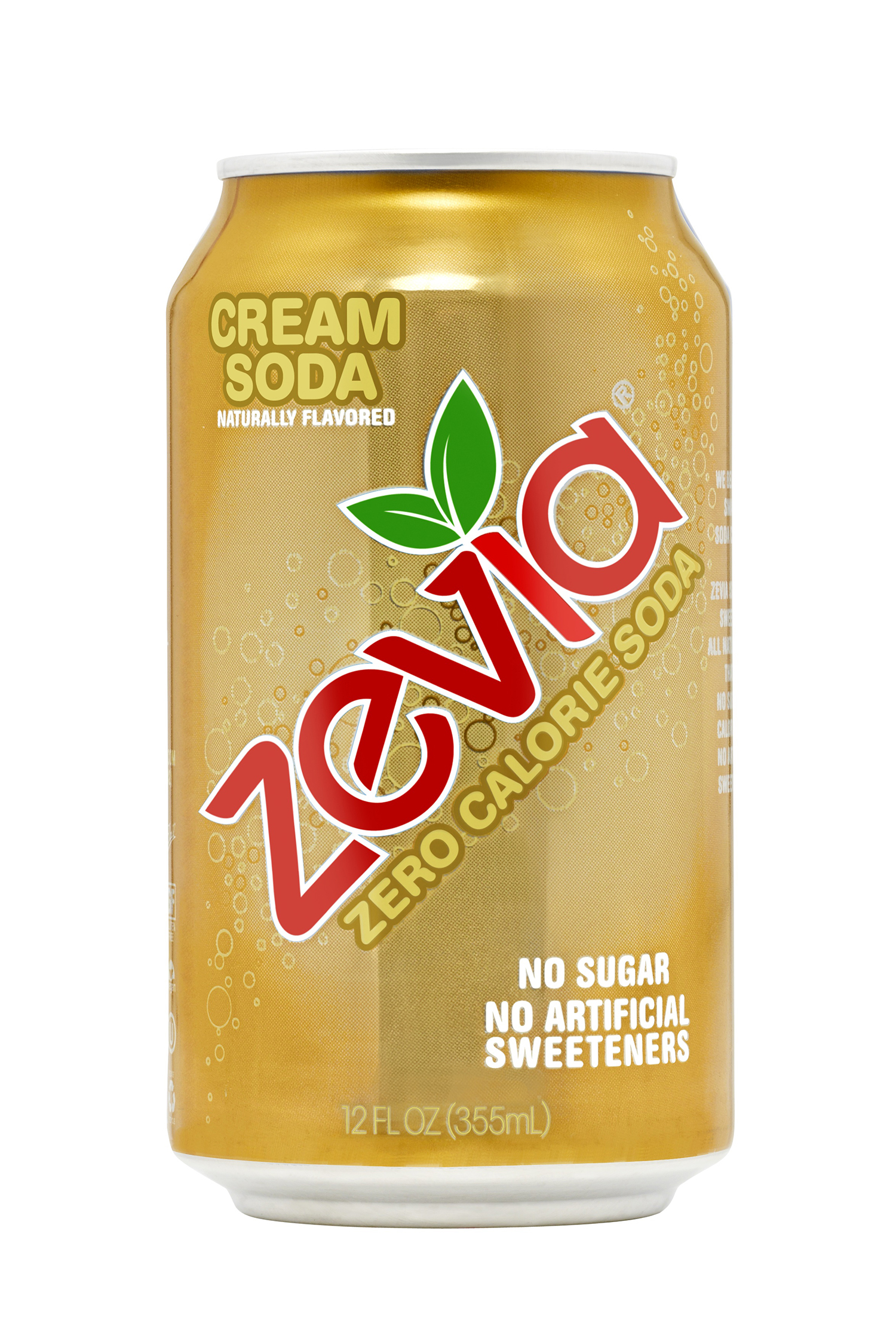
Cream Soda

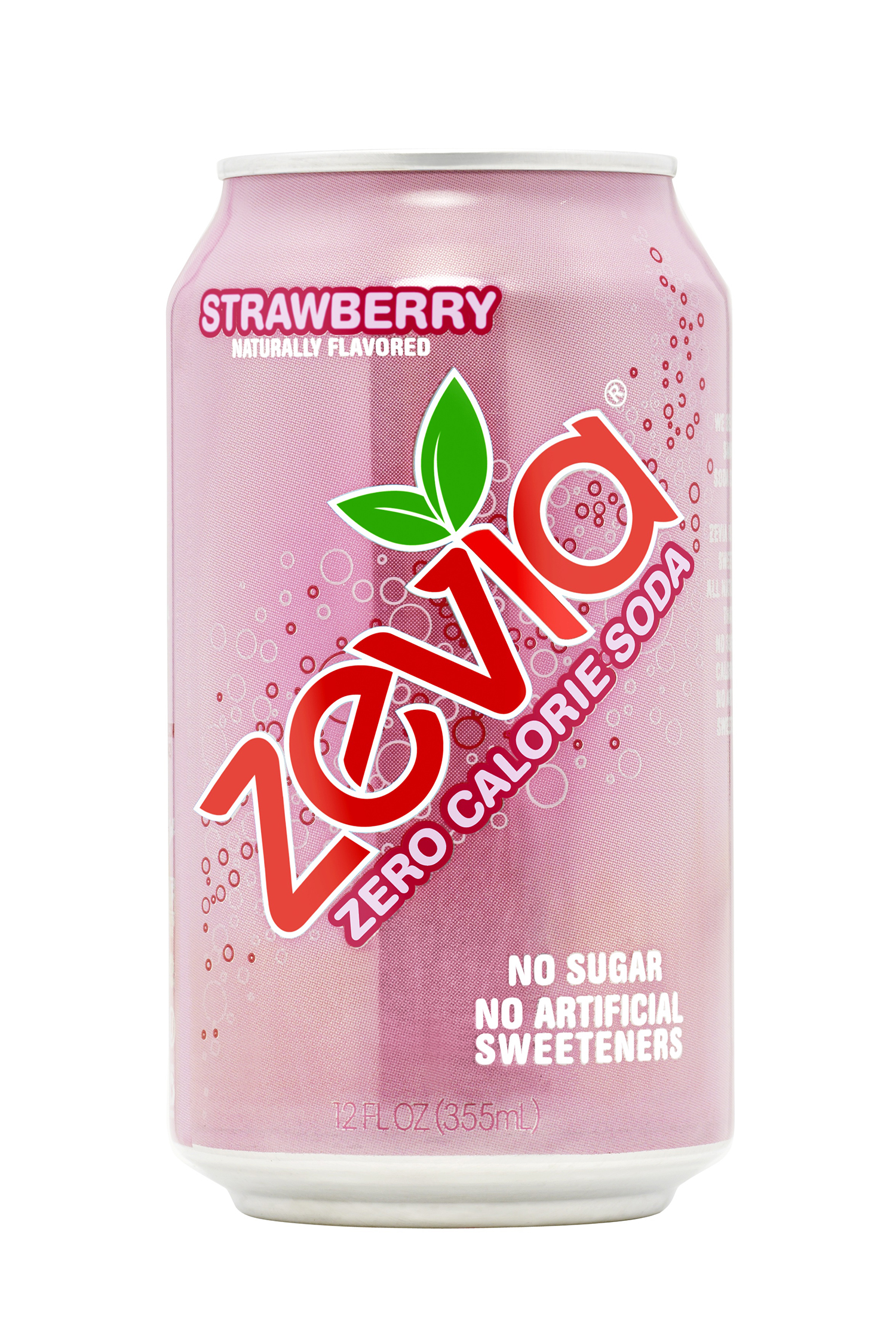
Strawberry

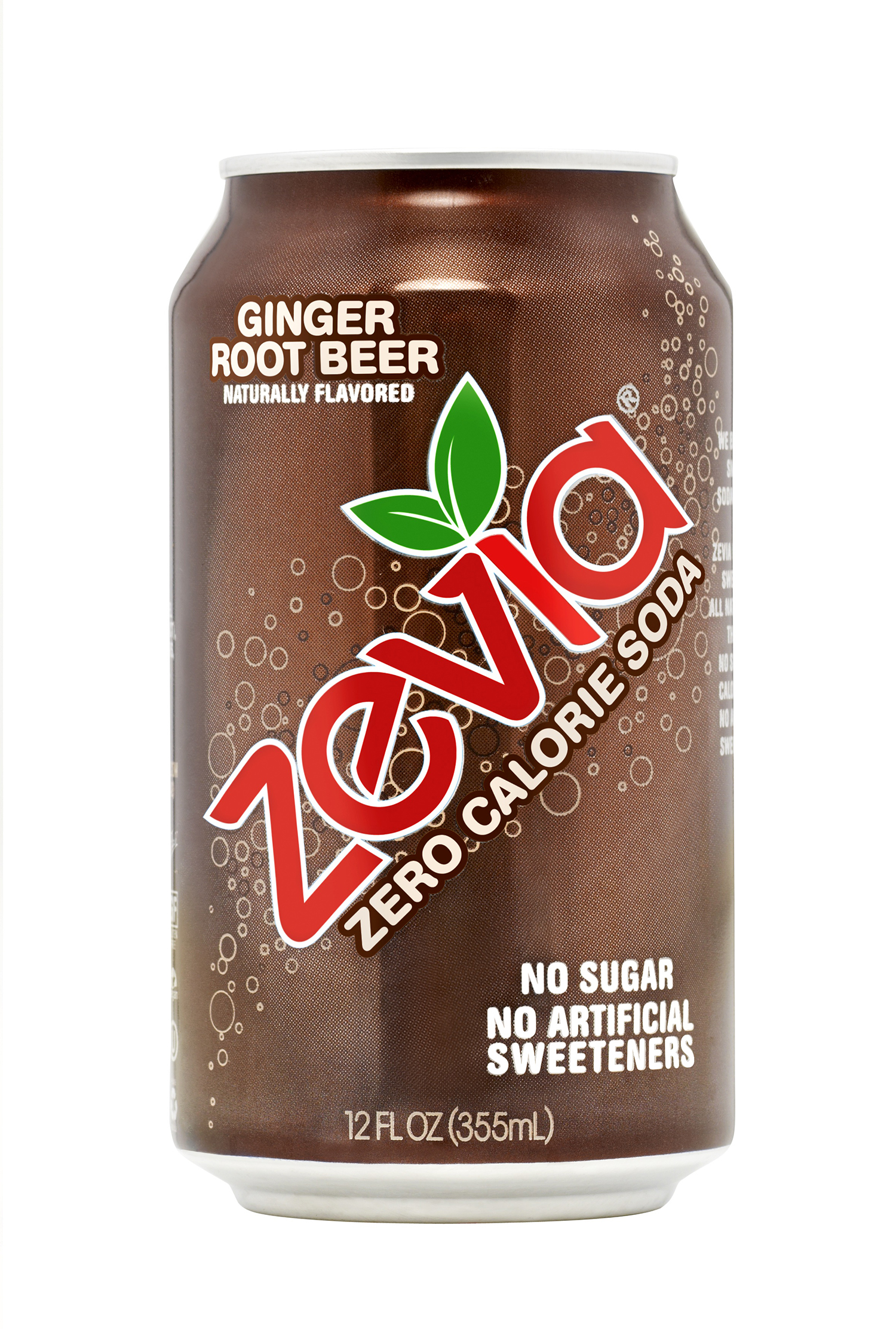
Ginger Root Beer

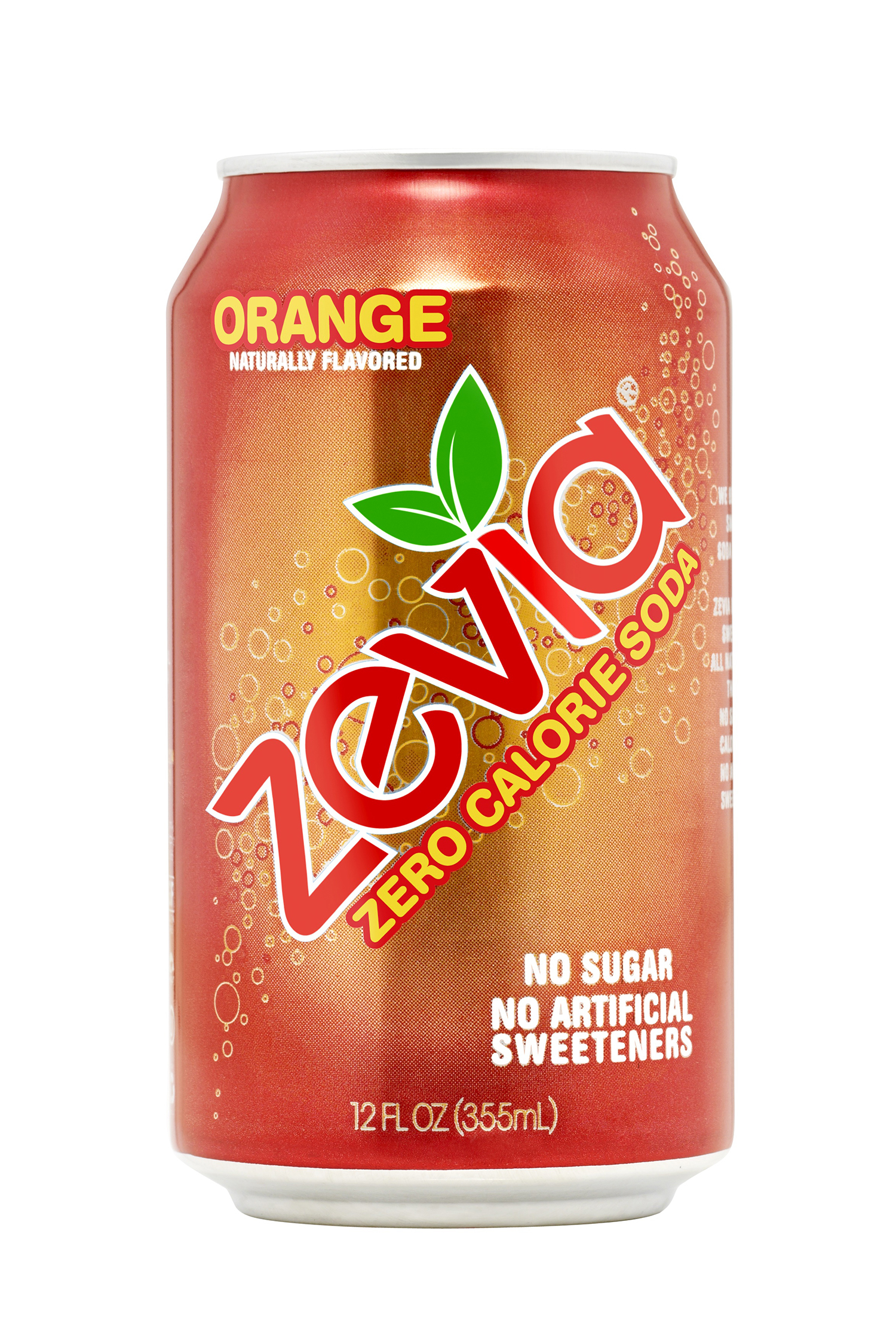
Orange

== Corporate history ==
Zevia was launched in 2007 as an alternative soft drink for those who want to avoid both added sugars and artificial sweeteners. The company was founded in Seattle, Washington by Derek Newman, Jessica Newman, and Ian Eisenberg.

By the end of 2008, ACNielsen recorded that Zevia was the fastest growing natural product in the United States in terms of sales. The company's 2008 revenue was $925,000, and the product was available in 850 stores. In 2010, Zevia reported a 300% increase in same-store sales over 2009.

Paddy Spence bought Zevia in 2010 and became both CEO and chairman.

In June 2021, the company filed to go public with an IPO on the NYSE.

== Marketing ==
In July 2012, Zevia ran billboard ads in support of New York City's soda ban, and Spence appeared on CNBC to promote healthier soda alternatives.

In 2014, Zevia entered a sponsorship with Major League Baseball and became the official soda of the Oakland Athletics. The soda is sold in bottles at all concessions stands at the Oakland–Alameda County Coliseum.
