= Shirley Temple (drink) =

Non-alcoholic mixed drink

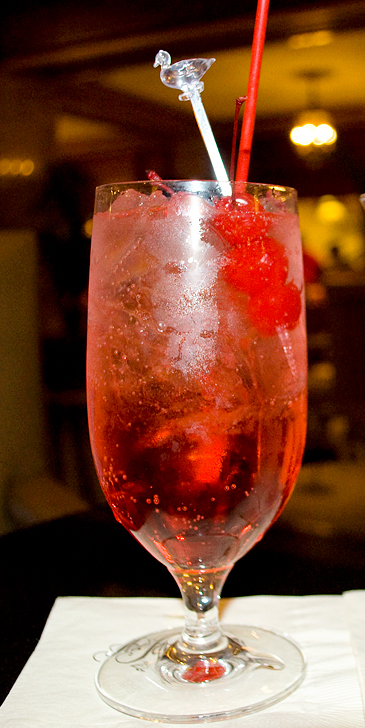
- Type: Non-alcoholic mixed drink
- Ingredients: Ginger ale and grenadine
- Standard garnish: Maraschino cherry

A Shirley Temple is a non-alcoholic mixed drink traditionally made with ginger ale and a splash of grenadine, and is garnished with a maraschino cherry. Modern Shirley Temple recipes may use lemon-lime soda or lemonade, and sometimes orange juice, in part or in whole, include a citrus wedge or slice as a garnish, and use maraschino cherry juice. Shirley Temples are often served as an alternative to alcoholic cocktails.

The Shirley Temple is also known as a "kiddie cocktail".

== Origin ==
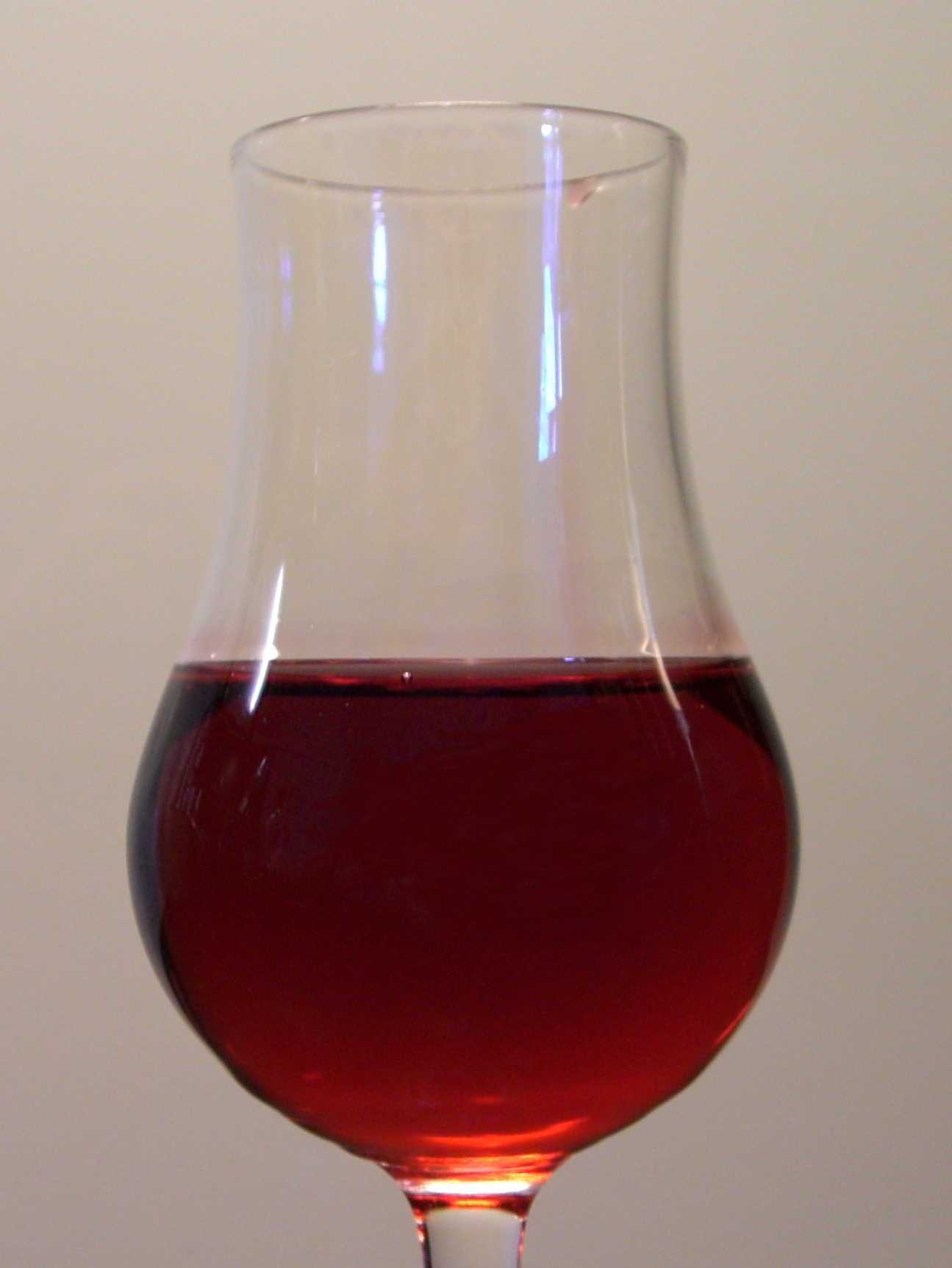
A glass of pure grenadine

The drink may have been invented at Chasen's, a restaurant in West Hollywood, California, to serve then-child actress Shirley Temple. However, other claims to its origin have been made. Temple herself was not a fan of the drink, as she told Scott Simon in an NPR interview in 1986:

The saccharine sweet, icky drink? Yes, well... those were created in the probably middle 1930s by the Brown Derby Restaurant in Hollywood and I had nothing to do with it. But, all over the world, I am served that. People think it's funny. I hate them. Too sweet!

In 1988, Temple filed a lawsuit to prevent the sale of a bottled soda version using her name. In October 2024, American soft drink brand 7 Up introduced a limited release Shirley Temple–flavored variety, which was later reintroduced in October 2025. By 2026, many soda brands had released Shirley Temple flavors.

== With alcohol ==
Adding 1.5 US fluid ounces (44 ml) of vodka or rum produces a "Dirty Shirley" or "Shirley Temple Black", the latter referring to the name the actress took as an adult.

== See also ==
- Arnold Palmer (drink)
- Queen Mary (beer cocktail)
- Roy Rogers (drink)
