= Grenadine =

Fruit syrup with a flavor that is both tart and sweet

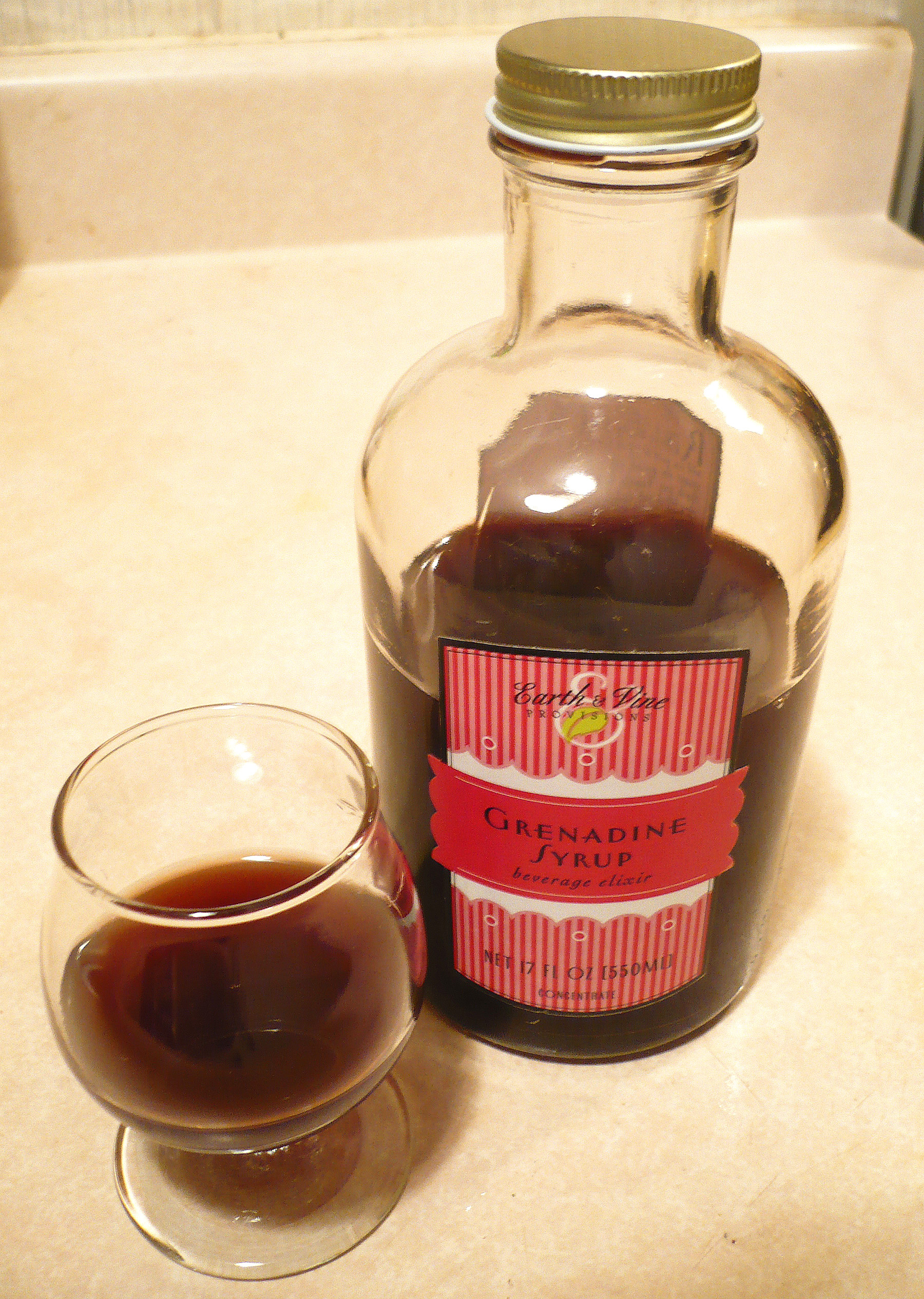
A glass and bottle of grenadine

Grenadine (/ˈɡrɛnədiːn/) is a nonalcoholic bar syrup commonly used as a cocktail ingredient, distinguished by its sweetness, mild flavor, and red color. Popular in mixed drinks, grenadine syrup was traditionally made from pomegranate, but today is most commonly made from commercially produced natural or artificial flavors, as well as substitute fruits (such as blackcurrant, elderberry, raspberry, gooseberry, and their juices).

== Name ==
Grenadine syrup was originally prepared from pomegranate juice, sugar, and water, with its name deriving from the French word grenade, for pomegranate (from the Latin grānātum, "seeded").

It is not related to the Grenadines archipelago, which takes its name from Grenada, itself from Granada, Spain.

== Modern and commercial variants ==
As grenadine is subject to minimal regulation, its basic flavor profile can vary widely from the original pomegranate to combinations of unspecified natural and artificial flavors, to the use of other fruits, such as blackcurrant, elderberry, raspberry, and gooseberry.

To reduce production costs, manufacturers have widely replaced fruit bases with artificial ingredients. The "Rose's" brand (owned by Mott's) is by far the most common grenadine sold in the United States, and is formulated from (in order of concentration) high fructose corn syrup, water, citric acid, sodium citrate, sodium benzoate, FD&C Red #40, natural and artificial flavors, and FD&C Blue #1.

== Use ==
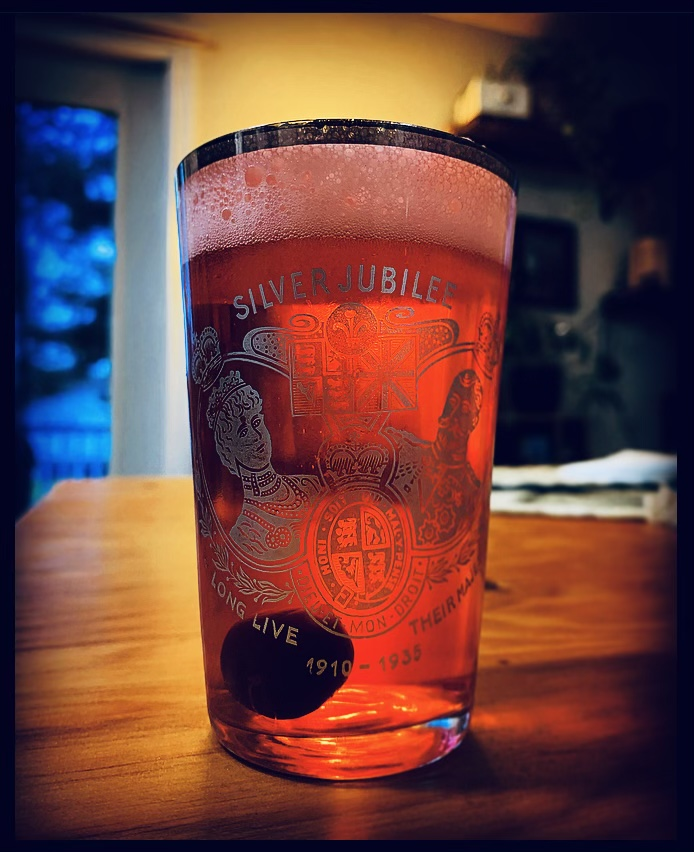
The Queen Mary is a beer cocktail using grenadine and Maraschino cherries

Grenadine is commonly used to mix both modern and classic cocktails, including:

- El Presidente – rum, orange curaçao, vermouth, and grenadine
- Mary Pickford – white rum, pineapple juice and grenadine
- Queen Mary – beer, grenadine and maraschino cherries, drizzled with cherry syrup
- Singapore sling – a gin-based sling cocktail
- Tequila sunrise – tequila, orange juice and grenadine
- Ward 8 – whiskey, lemon juice, orange juice and grenadine
- Zombie – a rum-based Tiki cocktail
- Terremoto – a traditional Chilean cocktail made with pipeño wine, pineapple ice cream and grenadine

Grenadine is also a popular ingredient in such non-alcoholic drinks as the Shirley Temple, Roy Rogers and the Diabolo.

== See also ==
- List of syrups
