= Non-alcoholic drink =

Version of alcoholic beverage containing no alcohol

An alcohol-free or non-alcoholic drink, also known as a temperance drink or mocktail for alcohol-free cocktail, is a version of an alcoholic drink made without alcohol, or with the alcohol removed or reduced to almost zero. These may take the form of a non-alcoholic mixed drink or non-alcoholic beer, and are widely available where alcoholic drinks are sold.

== Scientific definition ==
Sparkling apple cider, soft drinks, and juice naturally contain trace amounts or no alcohol. Some fresh orange juices are above the UK 'alcohol free' limit of 0.05% ABV, as are some yogurts and rye bread.

Ethanol distillation is used to separate alcoholic drinks into what are advertised as non-alcoholic drinks and spirits. Distilled wine produces low alcohol wine and brandy (from brandywine, derived from Dutch brandewijn, "burning wine").

=== Label ===
Most drinks advertised as "non-alcoholic" or "alcohol free" sold by countries with zero tolerance and a state-run liquor monopoly actually contain alcohol. In the European Union, the labels of drinks containing more than 1.2% ABV must state the actual alcoholic strength (i.e., show the word "alcohol" or the abbreviation "alc." followed by the symbol "% vol.").

Alcohol is a psychoactive drug, and some critics say that the label "non-alcoholic" is misleading, due to the presence of small amounts of alcohol in most drinks labelled as such, and a threat to recovering alcoholics.

== Non-alcoholic mixed drinks ==
Non-alcoholic cocktails often resemble alcoholic cocktails without any liquor. They can be a blend of fresh fruit juices, syrups, cream, herbs and spices, or can use non-alcoholic spirits. These drinks are designed specifically for those who are sober, and are particularly favored over cocktails by teetotalers, underage persons, drivers, pregnant women, and others who choose drinks that are alcohol-free.

== Fruestas ==
The Woman's Christian Temperance Union publishes several recipes for fruestas, which are nonalcoholic fruit drinks for large functions, such as proms and weddings. As a locution, fruesta drinks are etymologically derived from "fruit" and "fiesta", being a portmanteau of the two words.

== Legal definitions ==
=== EU ===
In the European Union, the labels of drinks containing more than 1.2% ABV must state the actual alcoholic strength (i.e., show the word "alcohol" or the abbreviation "alc." followed by the symbol "% vol.").

==== Denmark ====
The government of Denmark have decided to change the alcohol free legal definition from 0.1% alcohol by volume to 0.5%. This is due to the different taste of 0.5% than of 0.1%.

==== Finland ====
Non-alcoholic beverage means a beverage which contains a maximum of 1.2 percentage by volume ethyl alcohol.

==== Italy ====
Non-alcoholic beer, termed as "birra analcolica", is regulated as equal to or less than 1.2% ABV.

==== Sweden ====
Systembolaget defines alcohol-free as a drink that contains no more than 0.5% alcohol by volume.

==== United Kingdom ====
Licensing laws only place restrictions on the sale or consumption of drinks with an alcohol content of over 0.5%.

=== Japan ===
In Japanese Liquor Tax Law, alcoholic drinks (酒類, shurui) are defined as equal to or more than 1% ABV, so that drinks that are less than 1% ABV are not treated as alcoholic drink. However, Advertisement Judging Committee on Alcoholic Drink (酒類の広告審査委員会, Shurui no Kōkoku Shinsa Īnkai), organization for making self‐imposed regulation, defines non-alcoholic drinks (ノンアルコール飲料, non'arukōru inryō) as drinks that 0.00% ABV.

=== Norway ===
An alcohol free drink is defined as under 0.7% alcohol by volume.

=== Russia ===
Non-alcoholic drinks are defined as containing less than 0.5% abv in general, or less than 1.2% abv if based on a fermentation product, including drinks like kefir, kvass and medovukha. This also includes low-alcohol beers by definition.

=== United States ===
A malt drink that contains less than 0.5% alcohol by volume does not have to be labeled.

(e) Non-alcoholic. The term "non-alcoholic" may be used on labels of malt beverages only if the statement "contains less than 0.5 percent (or .5%) alcohol by volume" appears immediately adjacent to it, in readily legible printing, and on a completely contrasting background. No tolerances are permitted for malt beverages labeled as "non-alcoholic" and containing less than 0.5 percent alcohol by volume. A malt beverage may not be labeled with an alcohol content of 0.0 percent alcohol by volume, unless it is also labeled as "alcohol free" in accordance with paragraph (f) of this section, and contains no alcohol. (f) Alcohol free. The term "alcohol free" may be used only on malt beverages containing no alcohol. No tolerances are permitted for "alcohol free" malt beverages.

— U.S. Code of Federal Regulations, Title 27, Part 7—Labeling and advertising of malt beverages, Subpart E §7.65 Alcohol content

== See also ==
- Alcohol law
- Alcohol-free bar
- Non-alcoholic malt drinks
