= Korean cuisine =

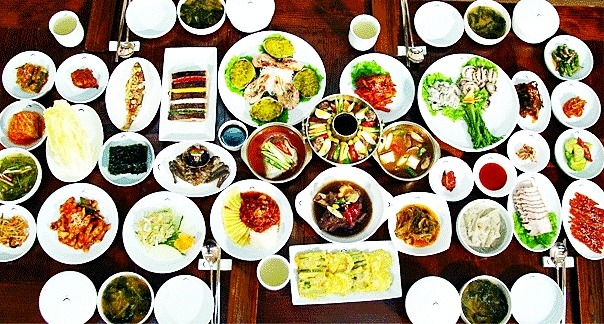
Hanjeongsik, Korean-style delicate and fine dining

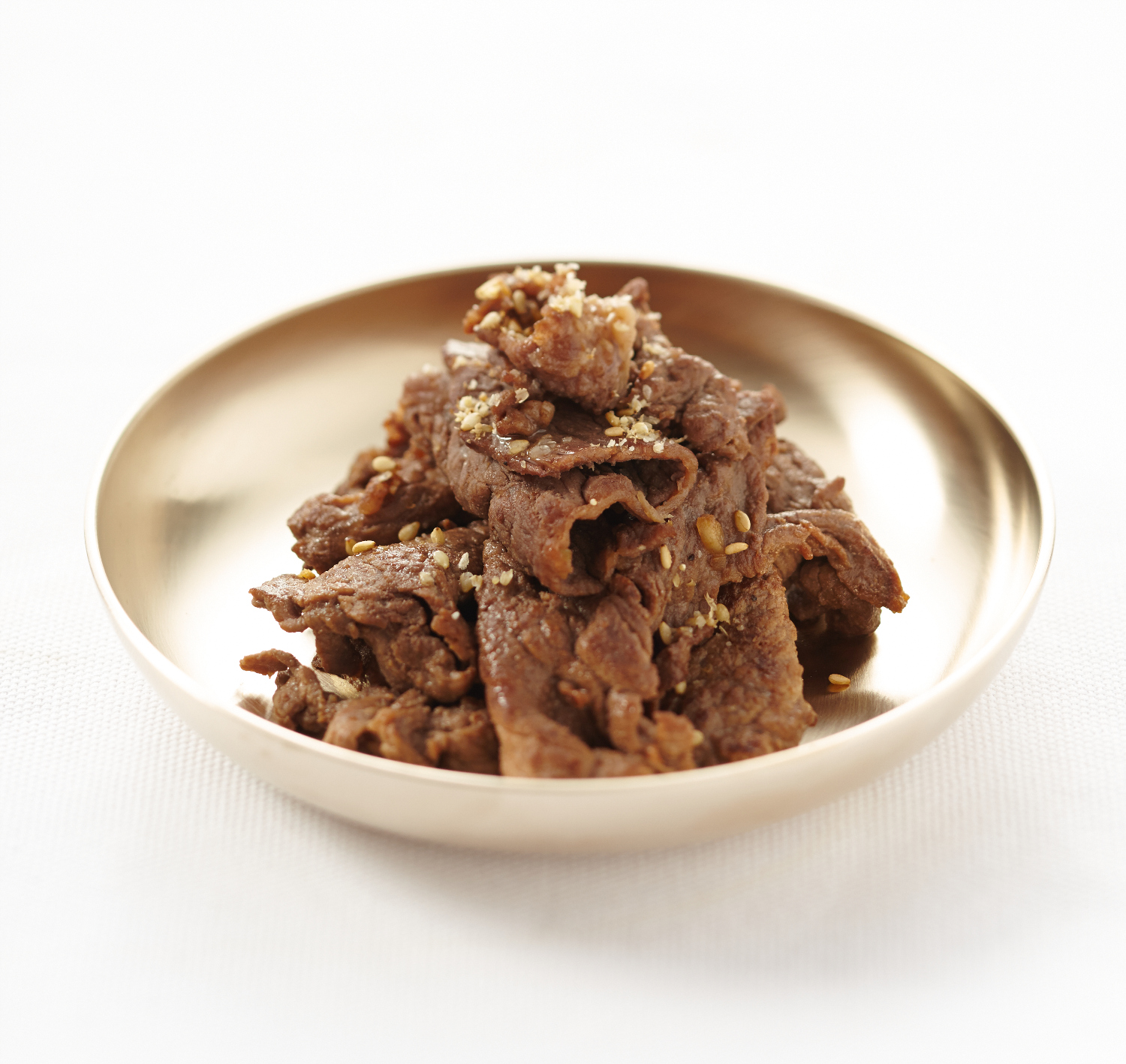
Bulgogi, Korean-style marinated sliced meat

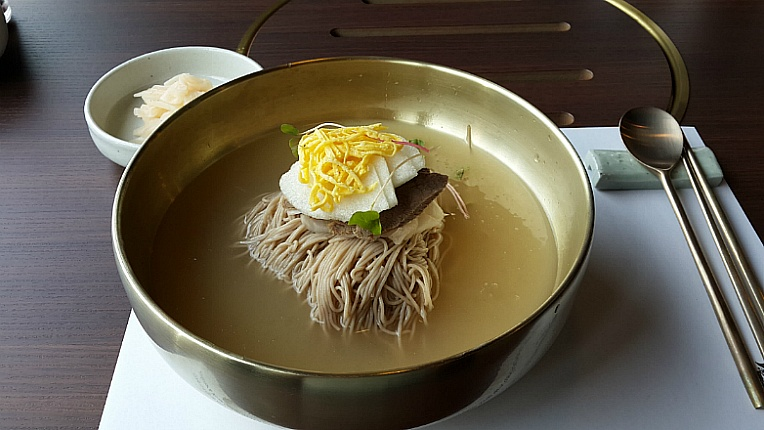
Naengmyeon, Korean-style cold noodles with buckwheat

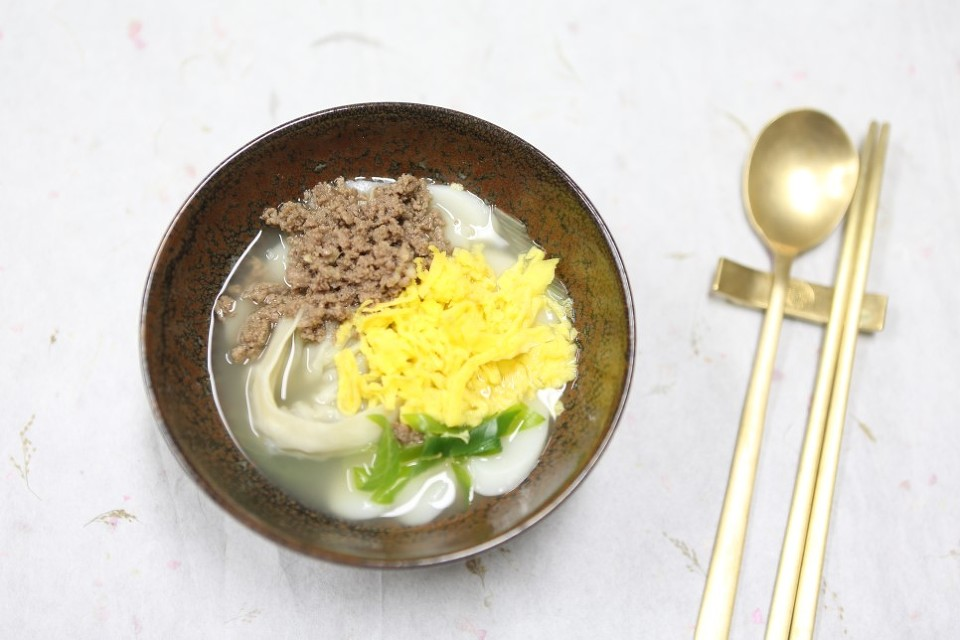
Tteokguk, Korean New Year soup with rice cake

Korean cuisine is the set of foods and culinary styles which are associated with Korean culture. As Korean popular culture has gained global popularity, Korean cuisine has also become popular worldwide. This cuisine has evolved through centuries of social and political change. Originating from ancient agricultural and nomadic traditions in Korea and southern Manchuria, Korean cuisine reflects a complex interaction of the natural environment and different cultural trends.

Korean cuisine is largely based on rice, vegetables, seafood and (at least in South Korea) meats. Dairy is largely absent from the traditional Korean diet. Traditional Korean meals are named for the number of side dishes (반찬; 飯饌; banchan) that accompany steam-cooked short-grain rice. Kimchi is served at nearly every meal. Commonly used ingredients include sesame oil, doenjang (fermented bean paste), soy sauce, salt, garlic, ginger, gochugaru (pepper flakes), gochujang (fermented red chili paste) and napa cabbage.

Ingredients and dishes vary by province. Many regional dishes have become national. Korean royal court cuisine once brought all of the unique regional specialties together for the royal family. Foods are regulated by Korean cultural etiquette.

Kimjang, which refers to the process of making kimchi, is listed on the UNESCO Intangible Heritage List.

== History ==
=== Prehistoric ===
In the Jeulmun pottery period (approximately 8000 to 1500 BCE), hunter-gatherer societies engaged in fishing and hunting, and incipient agriculture in the later stages. Since the beginning of the Mumun pottery period (1500 BCE), agricultural traditions began to develop with new migrant groups from the Liao River basin of Manchuria. During the Mumun period, people grew millet, barley, wheat, legumes and rice, and continued to hunt and fish. Archaeological remains point to development of fermented beans during this period, and cultural contact with nomadic cultures to the north facilitated domestication of animals.

=== Three Kingdoms period ===
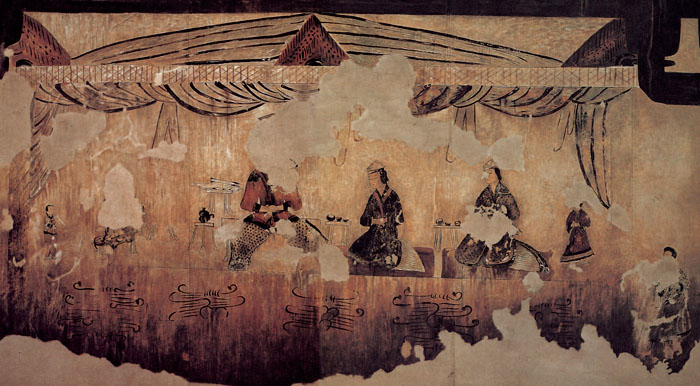
In a mural of Gakjeochong (각저총 "Tombs of Wrestlers"), a Goguryeo tomb built around the 5th century shows a Goguryeo nobleman having a meal with two ladies.

The Three Kingdoms period (57 BCE – 668 CE) was one of rapid cultural evolution. The kingdom of Goguryeo (37 BCE – 668 CE) was located in the northern part of the peninsula along much of modern-day Manchuria. The second kingdom, Baekje (18 BCE – 660 CE), was in the southwestern portion of the peninsula, and the third, Silla (57 BCE – 935 CE), was located at the southeastern portion of the peninsula. Each region had its own distinct set of cultural practices and foods. For example, Baekje was known for cold foods and fermented foods like kimchi. The spread of Buddhism and Confucianism through cultural exchanges with China during the fourth century CE began to change the distinct cultures of Korea.

Attributed with the earliest kimchi, the Goguryeo people were skilled at fermenting and widely consumed fermented food.

=== Goryeo period ===
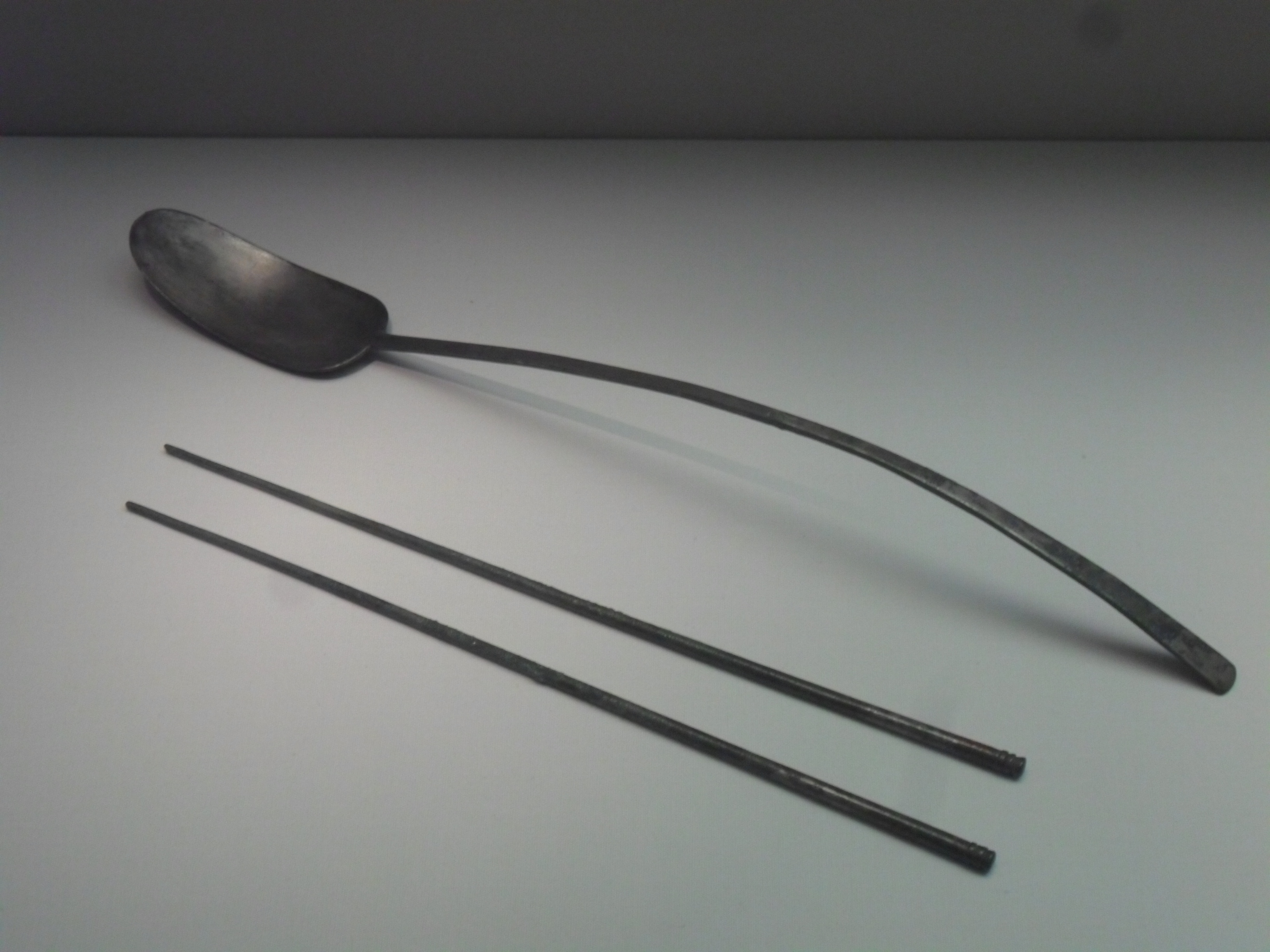
Silver spoon and chopsticks entombed with King Injong in 1146

During the latter Goryeo period, the Mongols invaded Goryeo in the 13th century. Some traditional foods found today in Korea have their origins during this period. The dumpling dish, mandu, grilled meat dishes, noodle dishes, and the use of seasonings such as black pepper, all have their roots in this period.

=== Joseon period ===
Agricultural innovations were significant and widespread during this period, such as the invention of the rain gauge during the 15th century. During 1429, the government began publishing books on agriculture and farming techniques, which included Nongsa chiksŏl (literally "Straight Talk on Farming"), an agricultural book compiled under King Sejong.

A series of invasions in the earlier half of the Joseon caused a dynamic shift in the culture during the second half of the period. Groups of silhak ("practical learning") scholars began to emphasize the importance of looking outside the country for innovation and technology to help improve the agricultural systems. Crops traded by Europeans from the New World began to appear, acquired through trade with China, Japan, Europe, and the Philippines; these crops included maize, sweet potatoes, chili peppers, tomatoes, peanuts, and squash. Potatoes and sweet potatoes were particularly favored as they grew in soils and on terrains that were previously unused.

Chili peppers gradually became more widely used in Korean cuisine during the Joseon period. By the nineteenth century, they had become important ingredients in kimchi and other Korean foods. The increased use of chili peppers contributed to the development of Korea's spicy food culture.

Government further developed agriculture through technology and lower taxation. Complex irrigation systems built by government allowed peasant farmers to produce larger crop volumes and produce crops not only for sustenance but also as cash crops. Reduced taxation of the peasantry also furthered the expanded commerce through increasing periodic markets, usually held every five days. One thousand such markets existed in the 19th century, and were communal centers for economic trade and entertainment.

The end of the Joseon period was marked by consistent encouragement to trade with the Western world, China and Japan. In the 1860s, trade agreements pushed by the Japanese government led the Joseon dynasty to open its trade ports with the west, and to numerous treaties with the United States, Britain, France, and other Western countries.

The opening of Korea to the Western world brought further exchange of culture and food. Western missionaries introduced new ingredients and dishes to Korea. Joseon elites were introduced to these new foods by way of foreigners who attended the royal court as advisers or physicians. This period also saw the introduction of various seasonings imported from Japan via western traders and alcoholic drinks from China.

=== Colonial period to modern period ===
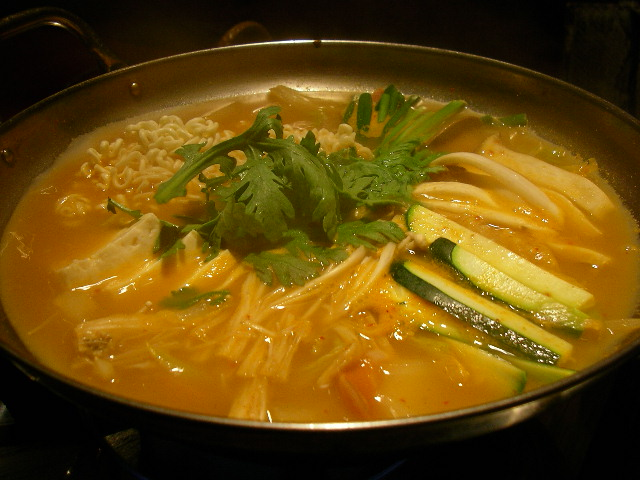
Budae jjigae, a spicy stew originated during the Korean War.

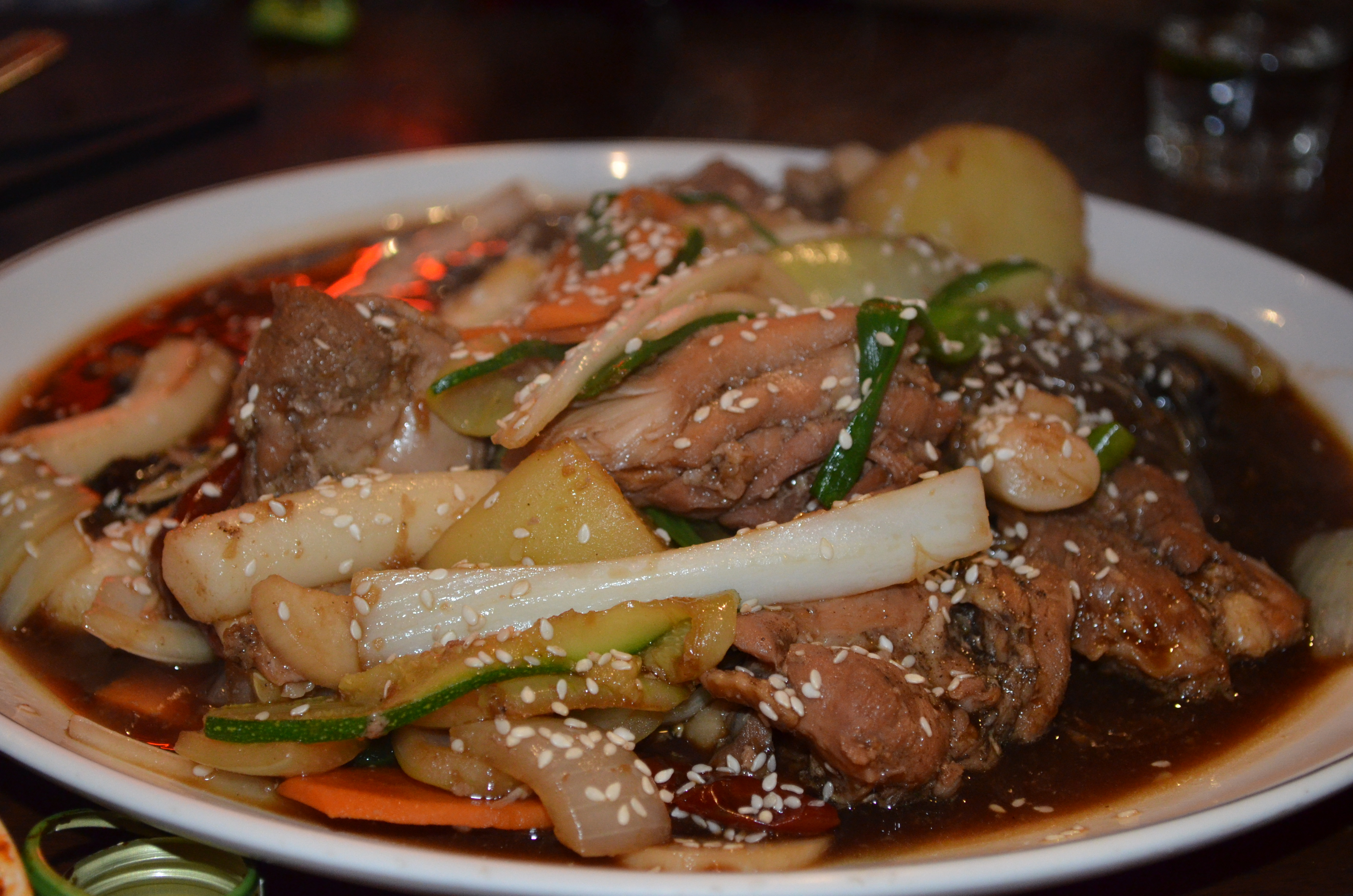
Korean chicken dish (Jjimdak) in Sydney, Australia

Japan occupied the Korean peninsula from 1910 to 1945. Many of its agricultural systems were taken over by the Japanese to support Japan's food supply. Land changes resulting from the Japanese occupation included combining small farms into large-scale farms, which led to larger yields. Rice production increased during this period to support the Empire of Japan's war efforts. Many Koreans, in turn, increased the production of other grains for their own consumption.

Meals during the Japanese occupation were quite varied. Koreans usually ate two meals a day during the cold seasons, and three during the warm seasons. For the lower classes, satiety, rather than quality, was most important. Those in even lower economic levels were likely to enjoy only a single bowl of white rice each year, while the remainder of the year's meals consisted of cheaper grains, such as millet and barley. For the Korean middle and upper classes during the occupation, things were quite different. Western foods began emerging in the Korean diet, such as white bread and commercially produced staples such as precooked noodles. The Japanese occupational period ended after the defeat of Japan during World War II.

The country remained in a state of turmoil through the Korean War (1950–1953) and the Cold War, which separated the country into North Korea and South Korea. Both of these periods continued the limited food provisions for Koreans, and the stew called budae jjigae, which makes use of inexpensive processed foods such as sausage and Spam, originated during this period.

At this point, the history of North and South Korea sharply diverged. In the 1960s under President Park Chung Hee, industrialization began to give South Korea the economic and cultural power it holds in the global economy today. Agriculture was increased through use of commercial fertilizers and modern farming equipment. In the 1970s, food shortages began to lessen. Consumption of instant and processed foods increased, as did the overall quality of foods. Livestock and dairy production was increased during the 1970s through the increase of commercial dairies and mechanized farms. The consumption of pork and beef increased vastly in the 1970s. Per-capita consumption of meat was 3.6 kg in 1961 and 11 kg by 1979. The result of this increased meat consumption brought about the rise of bulgogi restaurants, which gave the middle class of South Korea the ability to enjoy meat regularly. Meat eating continued to rise, reaching 40 kg in 1997, with fish consumption at 49.5 kg in 1998. Rice consumption continually decreased through these years, from 128 kg consumed per person in 1985 to 106 kg in 1995 and 83 kg in 2003. The decrease in rice consumption has been accompanied by an increase in the consumption of bread and noodles. In 2009, the South Korean government launched a $77-million culinary diplomacy program called "Korean Cuisine to the World" to promote its cuisine and subsequently pivoted into the markets in the United States and Muslim countries.

== Food ==
=== Grains ===
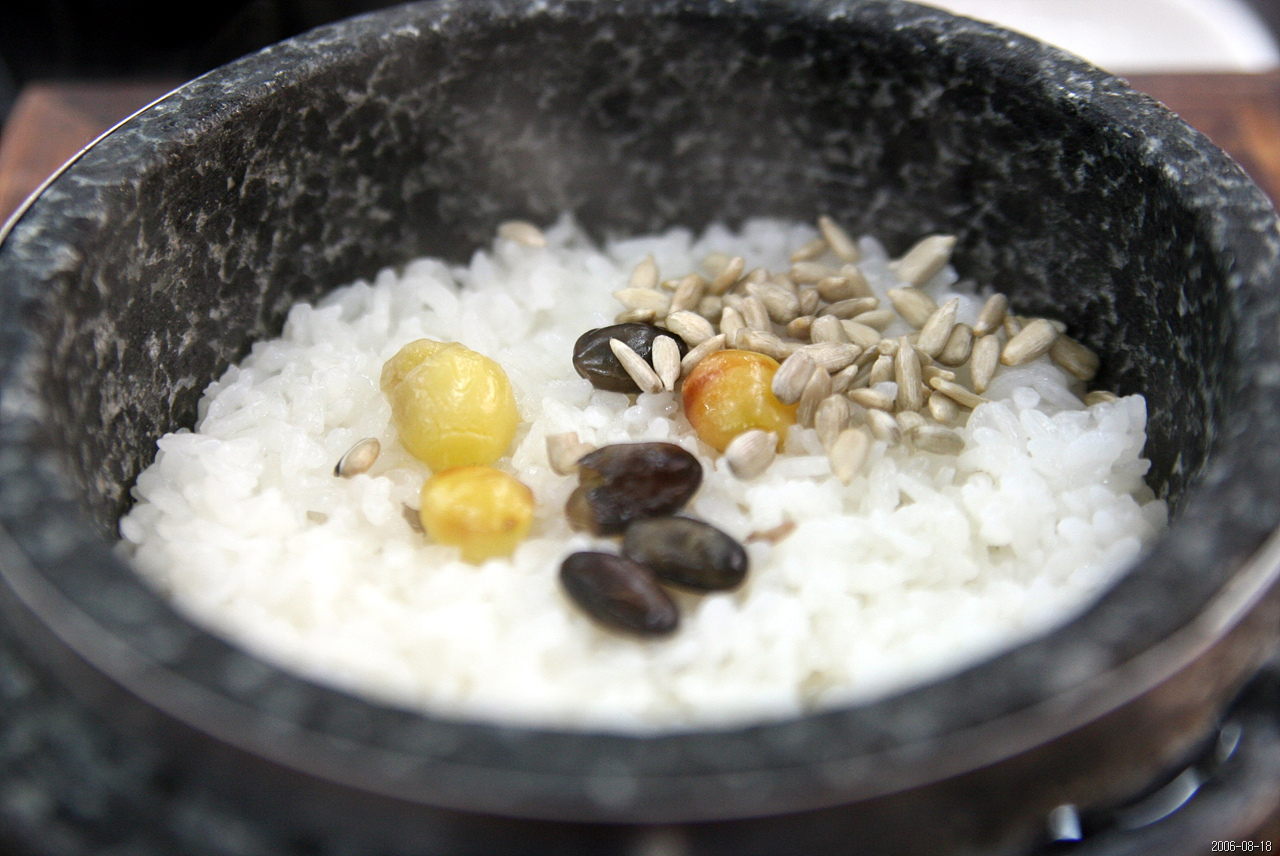
Dolsotbap, cooked rice in a stone pot (dolsot)

Grains have been one of the most important staples of the Korean diet. Early myths of the foundations of various kingdoms in Korea center on grains. One foundation myth relates to Jumong, who received barley seeds from two doves sent by his mother after establishing the kingdom of Goguryeo. Yet another myth speaks of the three founding deities of Jeju Island, who were to be wed to the three princesses of Tamna; the deities brought seeds of five grains which were the first seeds planted, which in turn became the first instance of farming.

During the pre-modern era, grains such as barley and millet were the main staples. They were supplemented by wheat, sorghum, and buckwheat. Rice is not an indigenous crop to Korea and millet was likely the preferred grain before rice was cultivated. Rice became the grain of choice during the Three Kingdoms period, particularly in the Silla and Baekje Kingdoms in the southern regions of the peninsula. Rice was such an important commodity in Silla that it was used to pay taxes. The Sino-Korean word for "tax" is a compound character that uses the character for the rice plant. The preference for rice escalated into the Joseon period, when new methods of cultivation and new varieties emerged that would help increase production.

As rice was prohibitively expensive when it first came to Korea, the grain was likely mixed with other grains to "stretch" the rice; this is still done in dishes such as boribap (rice with barley) and kongbap (rice with beans). White rice, which is rice with the bran removed, has been the preferred form of rice since its introduction into the cuisine. The most traditional method of cooking the rice has been to cook it in an iron pot called a sot (솥) or musoe sot (무쇠솥). This method of rice cookery dates back to at least the Goryeo period, and these pots have even been found in tombs from the Silla period. The sot is still used today, much in the same manner as it was in the past centuries.

Rice is used to make a number of items, outside of the traditional bowl of plain white rice. It is commonly ground into a flour and used to make rice cakes called tteok in over two hundred varieties. It is also cooked down into a congee (juk) or gruel (mieum) and mixed with other grains, meat, or seafood. Koreans also produce a number of rice wines, both in filtered and unfiltered versions. Grains have also been used for centuries to make misu and misu-garu, drinks made from grain powder that are sometimes used as meal supplements.

=== Fruits ===
Encompassing a wide range of temperate climates, the Korean peninsula supports the growth of many cultivated and wild fruit species. Asian pears of numerous varieties, persimmons, apples, citrus, melons, berries and more are typical of summer and fall produce. Asian pears and persimmons, being Pre-Columbian era staples, are particularly well-represented in culture as gifts, ceremonies, medicine, marinades, and subjects of art and poetry.

=== Legumes ===
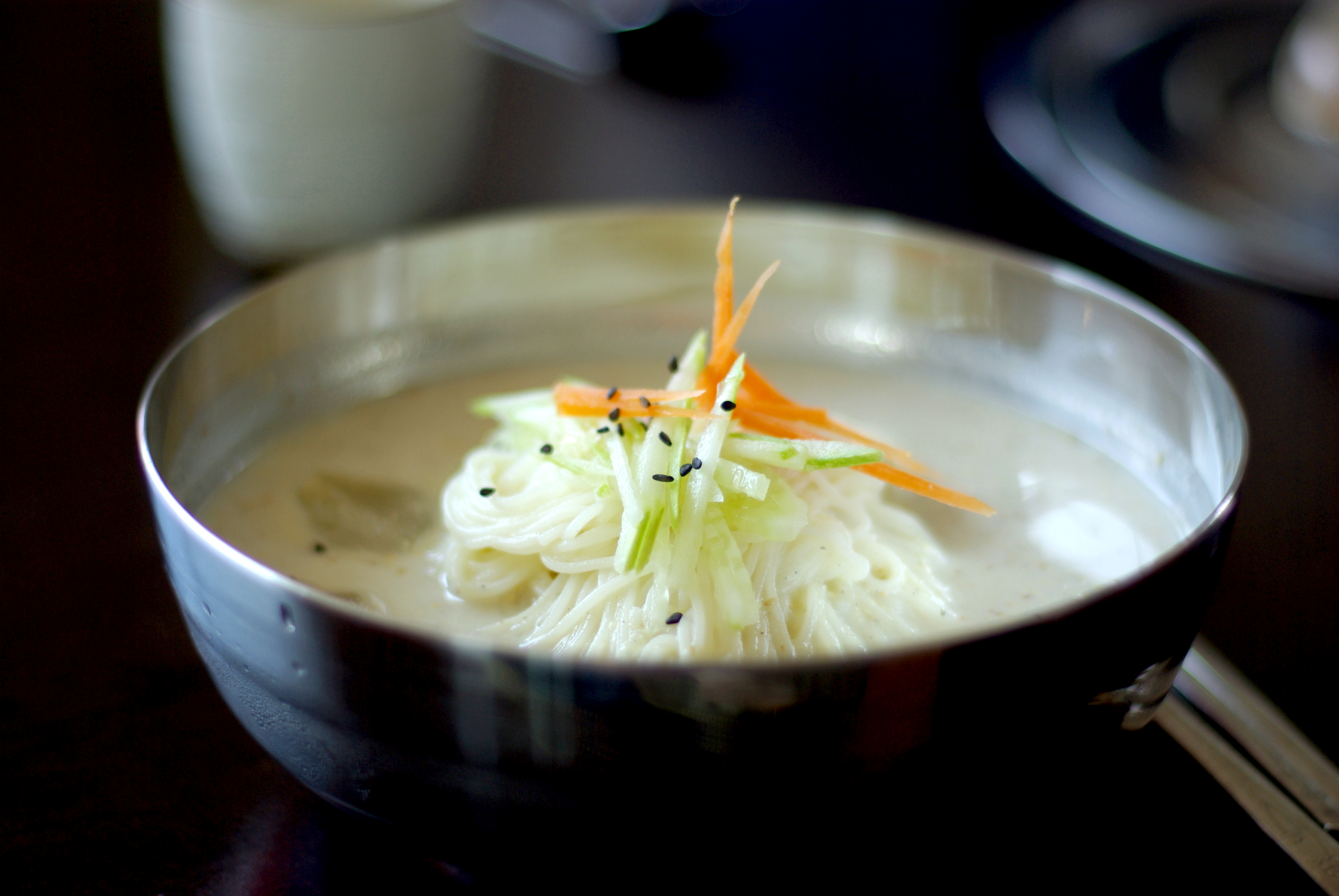
Kongguksu, a cold noodle dish with a broth made from ground soy beans

Legumes have been significant crops in Korean history and cuisine, according to the earliest preserved legumes found in archaeological sites in Korea. The excavation at Okbang site, Jinju, South Gyeongsang Province indicates soybeans were cultivated as a food crop circa 1000–900 BCE. They are still made into dubu (tofu), while soybean sprouts are sauteed as a vegetable (kongnamul) and whole soybeans are seasoned and served as a side dish. They are also made into soy milk, which is used as the base for the noodle dish called kongguksu. A byproduct of soy milk production is biji or kong-biji, which is served as a stew and also used to thicken stews and porridges. Soybeans may also be one of the beans in kongbap, boiled together with several types of beans and other grains, and they are also the primary ingredient in the production of fermented condiments collectively referred to as jang, such as soybean pastes, doenjang and cheonggukjang, a soy sauce called ganjang, chili pepper paste or gochujang and others.

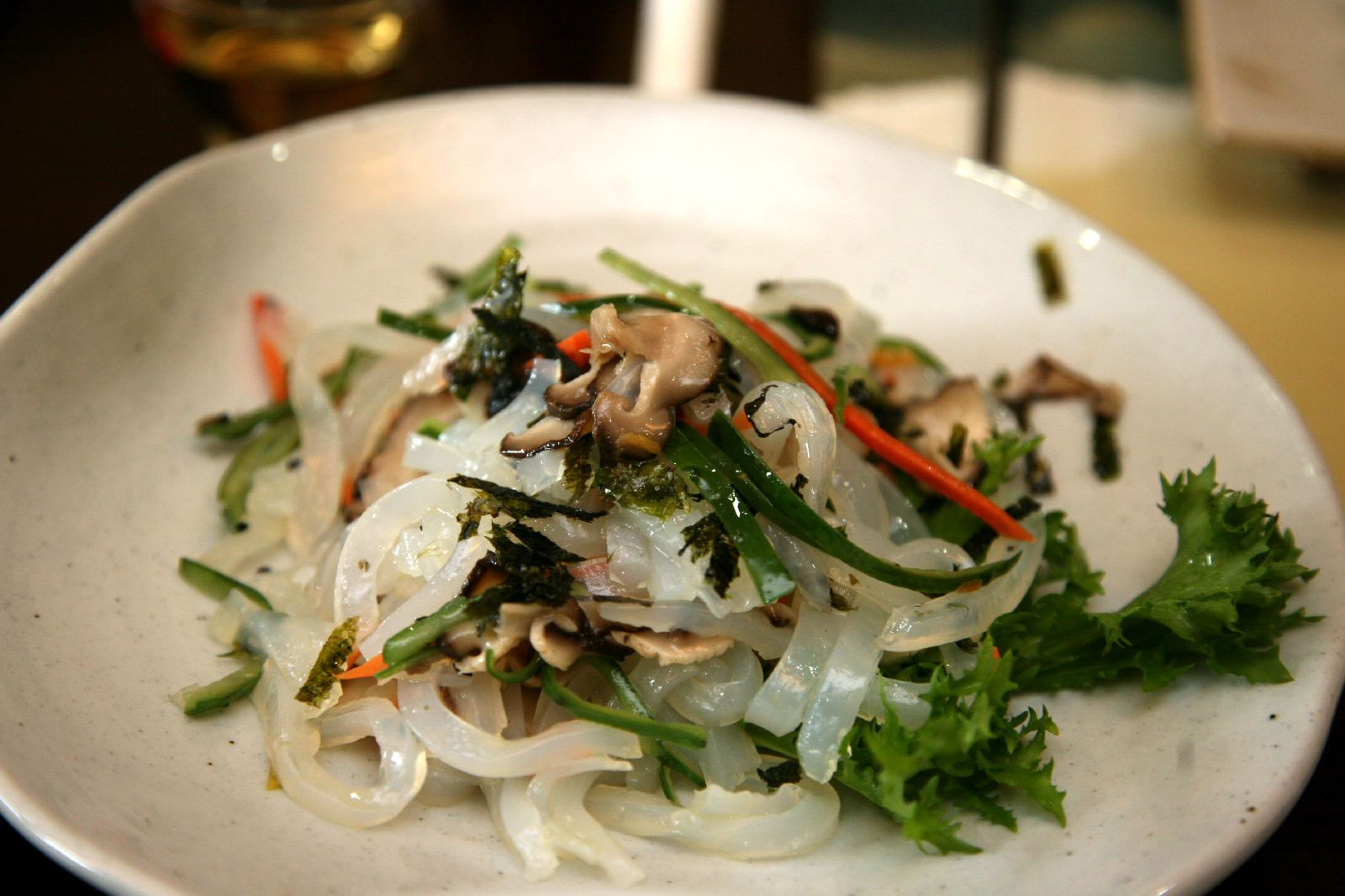
Tangpyeongchae, a dish made with nokdumuk (a mung bean starch jelly) and vegetables

Nokdu (Mung bean) is commonly used in Korean cuisine. Sukju namuls (Mung bean sprouts) are often served as a side dish, blanched and sautéed with sesame oil, garlic, and salt. Ground Nokdu is used to make a porridge called nokdujuk, which is eaten as a nutritional supplement and digestive aid, especially for ill patients. A popular snack, bindaetteok (mung bean pancake), is made with ground nokdu and fresh sukju namul. Starch extracted from ground nokdu is used to make transparent dangmyeon ( cellophane noodles). The dangmyeons are the main ingredients for japchae (a salad-like dish) and sundae (a blood sausage), and are a subsidiary ingredient for soups and stews. The starch can be also used to make jelly-like foods, such as nokdumuk and hwangpomuk. The muk have a bland flavor, so are served seasoned with soy sauce, sesame oil and crumbled seaweed or other seasonings such as tangpyeongchae.

Cultivation of azuki beans dates back to ancient times according to an excavation from Odong-ri, Hoeryong, North Hamgyong Province, which is assumed to be that of Mumun period (approximately 1500–300 BCE). Azuki beans are generally eaten as patbap, which is a bowl of rice mixed with the beans, or as a filling and covering for tteok (rice cake) and breads. A porridge made with azuki beans, called patjuk, is commonly eaten during the winter season. On Dongjinal, a Korean traditional holiday which falls on 22 December, Korean people eat donji patjuk, which contains saealsim (새알심), a ball made from glutinous rice flour. In old Korean tradition, patjuk is believed to have the power to drive evil spirits away.

=== Condiments and seasoning ===
Condiments are divided into fermented and nonfermented variants. Fermented condiments include ganjang, doenjang, gochujang and vinegars. Nonfermented condiments or spices include red pepper, black pepper, cordifolia, mustard, chinensis, garlic, onion, ginger, leek, and scallion (spring onion).

=== Gochujang ===
Gochujang can be found in many writings. Some of the writings are the Mangi Yoram, The Three States, the Nonggawolryeongga, the Gijaejapgi, and the Hyangyak-jipsongbang. The Hyangyak-jipseongbang, which dates back to around 1433 during the Chosun dynasty, is one of the oldest writings mentioning gochujang.

Gochujang is a fermented bean paste made with red pepper powder, fermented soybean powder (Meju) and rice flour. It typically can be added to most dishes. Gochujang can be used as a seasoning and sometimes as a dipping sauce. The taste is described as savory, peppery, salty, spicy and slightly sweet.

Many variations come from jang, fermented bean paste. Some variations can include doenjang (soybean and brine), kanjang (soybeans, water, and salt), chogochujang (gochujang and vinegar), and jeotgal (mixture of other jangs and seafoods).

Vegetables such as cucumbers, carrots, and cabbage use gochujang as a dip. Gochujang is a common seasoning for foods such as Korean barbecue including pork and beef. One popular snack food that is very commonly eaten with gochujang is bibimbap. Bibimbap includes rice, spinach, radish, bean sprouts. Sometimes beef is added to bibimbap. Another popular dish including gochujang is tteokbokki.

Gochujang was believed to revitalize people who were sick with colds or exhaustion during the Gio period. There have been some studies that show that red peppers fight obesity and diabetes. Gochujang is also added to many foods so that there can be additional nutritional value with each meal.

=== Meat ===
Koreans enjoying grilled meat and alcohol in the 18th century

In antiquity, most meat in Korea was likely obtained through hunting and fishing. Ancient records indicate rearing of livestock began on a small scale during the Three Kingdoms period. Meat was consumed roasted or in soups or stews during this period. Those who lived closer to the oceans were able to complement their diet with more fish, while those who lived in the interior had a diet containing more meat.

==== Beef ====
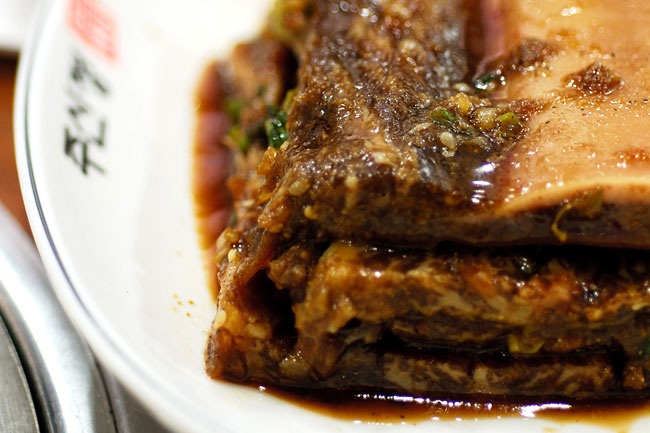
Marinated galbi before grilling

Beef is the most prized of all, with cattle holding an important cultural role in the Korean home. Beef is prepared in numerous ways today, including roasting, grilling (gui) or boiling in soups. Beef can also be dried into yukpo, a type of po, as with seafood, called eopo.

The cattle were valuable draught animals, often seen as equal to human servants, or in some cases, members of the family. Cattle were also given their own holiday during the first "cow" day of the lunar New Year. The importance of cattle does not suggest Koreans ate an abundance of beef, however, as the cattle were valued as beasts of burden and slaughtering one would create dire issues in farming the land. Pork and seafood were consumed more regularly for this reason. The Buddhist ruling class of the Goryeo period forbade the consumption of beef. The Mongols dispensed with the ban of beef during the 13th century, and they promoted the production of beef cattle. This increased production continued into the Joseon period, when the government encouraged both increased quantities and quality of beef. Only in the latter part of the 20th century has beef become regular table fare.

==== Chicken ====
Chicken has played an important role as a protein in Korean history, evidenced by a number of myths. One myth tells of the birth of Kim Alji, founder of the Kim family of Gyeongju being announced by the cry of a white chicken. As the birth of a clan's founder is always announced by an animal with preternatural qualities, this myth speaks to the importance of chicken in Korean culture. Chicken is often served roasted or braised with vegetables or in soups. All parts of the chicken are used in Korean cuisine, including the gizzard, liver, and feet. Young chickens are braised with ginseng and other ingredients in medicinal soups eaten during the summer months to combat heat called samgyetang. The feet of the chicken, called dakbal (닭발), are often roasted and covered with hot and spicy gochujang-based sauce and served as an anju, or side dish, to accompany alcoholic beverages, especially soju.

==== Pork ====
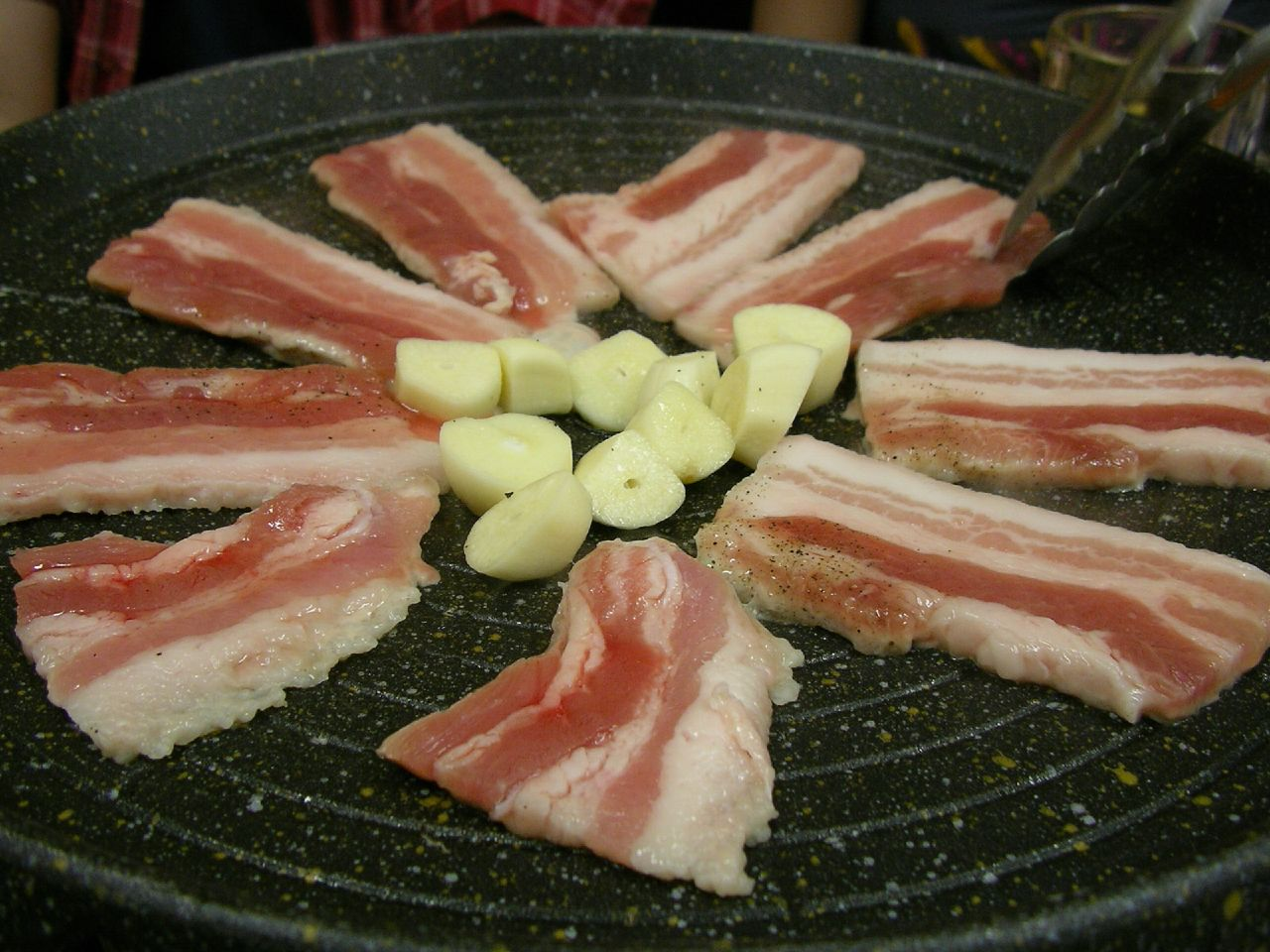
Samgyeopsal

Pork has also been another important land-based protein for Korea. Records indicate pork has been a part of the Korean diet back to antiquity, similar to beef.

A number of foods have been avoided while eating pork, including Chinese bellflower (doraji, 도라지) and lotus root (yeonn ppuri, 연뿌리), as the combinations have been thought to cause diarrhea. All parts of the pig are used in Korean cuisine, including the head, intestines, liver, kidney and other internal organs. Koreans utilize these parts in a variety of cooking methods including steaming, stewing, boiling and smoking. Koreans especially like to eat grilled pork belly, which is called samgyeopsal.

==== Fish and seafood ====
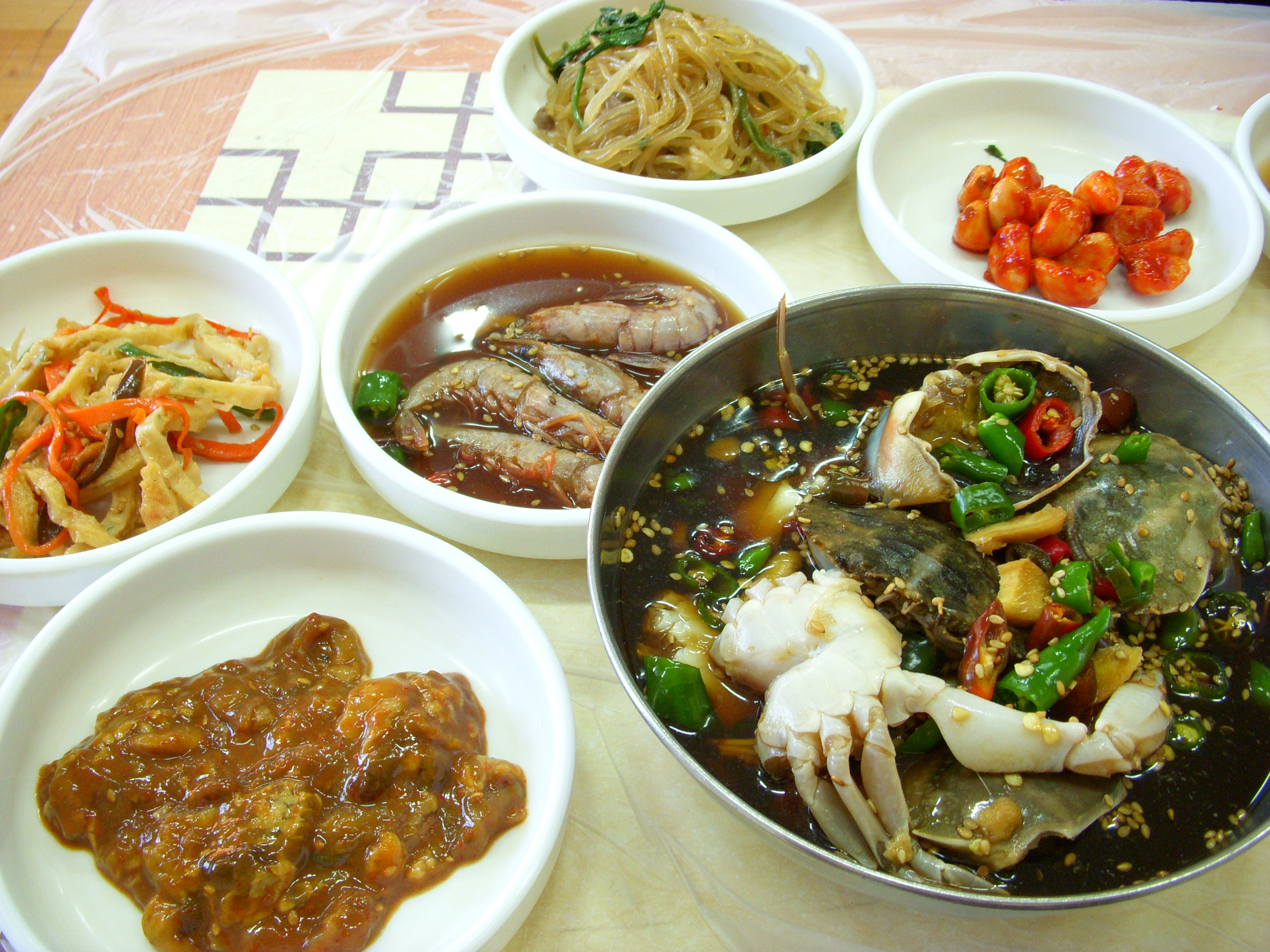
A bowl of gejang, marinated crabs in soy sauce and plates of various banchan (small side dishes)

Fish and shellfish have been a major part of Korean cuisine because of the oceans bordering the peninsula. Evidence from the 12th century illustrates commoners consumed a diet mostly of fish and shellfish, such as shrimp, clams, oysters, abalone, and loach, while sheep and hogs were reserved for the upper class.

Both fresh and saltwater fish are popular, and are served raw, grilled, broiled, dried or served in soups and stews. Common grilled fish include mackerel, hairtail, croaker and Pacific herring. Smaller fish, shrimp, squid, mollusks and countless other seafood can be salted and fermented as jeotgal. Fish can also be grilled either whole or in fillets as banchan. Fish is often dried naturally to prolong storing periods and enable shipping over long distances. Fish commonly dried include yellow corvina, anchovies (myeolchi) and croaker. Dried anchovies, along with kelp, form the basis of common soup stocks.

Shellfish is widely eaten in all different types of preparation. They can be used to prepare broth, eaten raw with chogochujang, which is a mixture of gochujang and vinegar, or used as a popular ingredient in countless dishes. Raw oysters and other seafood can be used in making kimchi to improve and vary the flavor. Salted baby shrimp are used as a seasoning agent, known as saeujeot, for the preparation of some types of kimchi. Large shrimp are often grilled as daeha gui (대하구이) or dried, mixed with vegetables and served with rice. Mollusks eaten in Korean cuisine include octopus, cuttlefish, and squid.

=== Vegetables ===
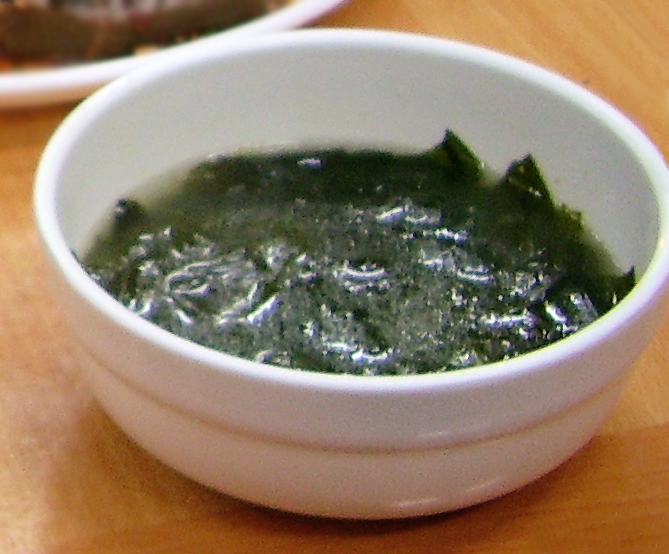
Miyeok guk, a soup made from the sea seaweed, miyeok

Korean cuisine uses a wide variety of vegetables, which are often served uncooked, either in salads or pickles, as well as cooked in various stews, stir-fried dishes, and other hot dishes. Commonly used vegetables include Korean radish, napa cabbage, cucumber, potato, sweet potato, spinach, bean sprouts, scallions, garlic, chili peppers, seaweed, korean zucchini, mushrooms, lotus root. Several types of wild greens, known collectively as chwinamul (such as Aster scaber), are a popular dish, and other wild vegetables such as bracken fern shoots (gosari) or Korean bellflower root (doraji) are also harvested and eaten in season. Traditional medicinal herbs in Korean cuisine, such as ginseng, lingzhi mushroom, wolfberry, Codonopsis pilosula, and Angelica sinensis, are often used as ingredients in cooking, as in samgyetang.

=== Medicinal foods ===
Medicinal food (boyangshik) is a wide variety of specialty foods prepared and eaten for their purported medicinal purposes, especially during the hottest 30-day period in the lunar calendar, called sambok. Hot foods consumed are believed to restore ki, as well as sexual and physical stamina lost in the summer heat. Commonly eaten boyangshik include ginseng, chicken, black goat, abalone, eel, carp, beef bone soups, pig kidneys.

==== Samgyetang ====
Samgyetang is a chicken ginseng soup traditionally consumed during Boknal (복날) days: the hottest days of summer. It is a Korean custom to eat hot food in hot weather called Iyeolchiyeol (이열치열), which means "controlling heat with heat". Consequently, Samgyetang is Koreans' favorite energizing food and it is common to have it on sambok (삼복) days—Chobok (초복), Jungbok (중복) and Malbok (말복)—which are believed to be the hottest days in Korea.

== Dishes ==
Korean foods can be largely categorized into groups of "main staple foods" (주식), "subsidiary dishes" (부식), and "dessert" (후식). The main dishes are made from grains such as bap (a bowl of rice), juk (porridge), and guksu (noodles).

Many Korean banchan rely on fermentation for flavor and preservation, resulting in a tangy, salty, and spicy taste. Certain regions are especially associated with some dishes (for example, the city of Jeonju with bibimbap) either as a place of origin or for a famous regional variety. Restaurants will often use these famous names on their signs or menus (e.g. "Suwon galbi").

=== Soups and stews ===
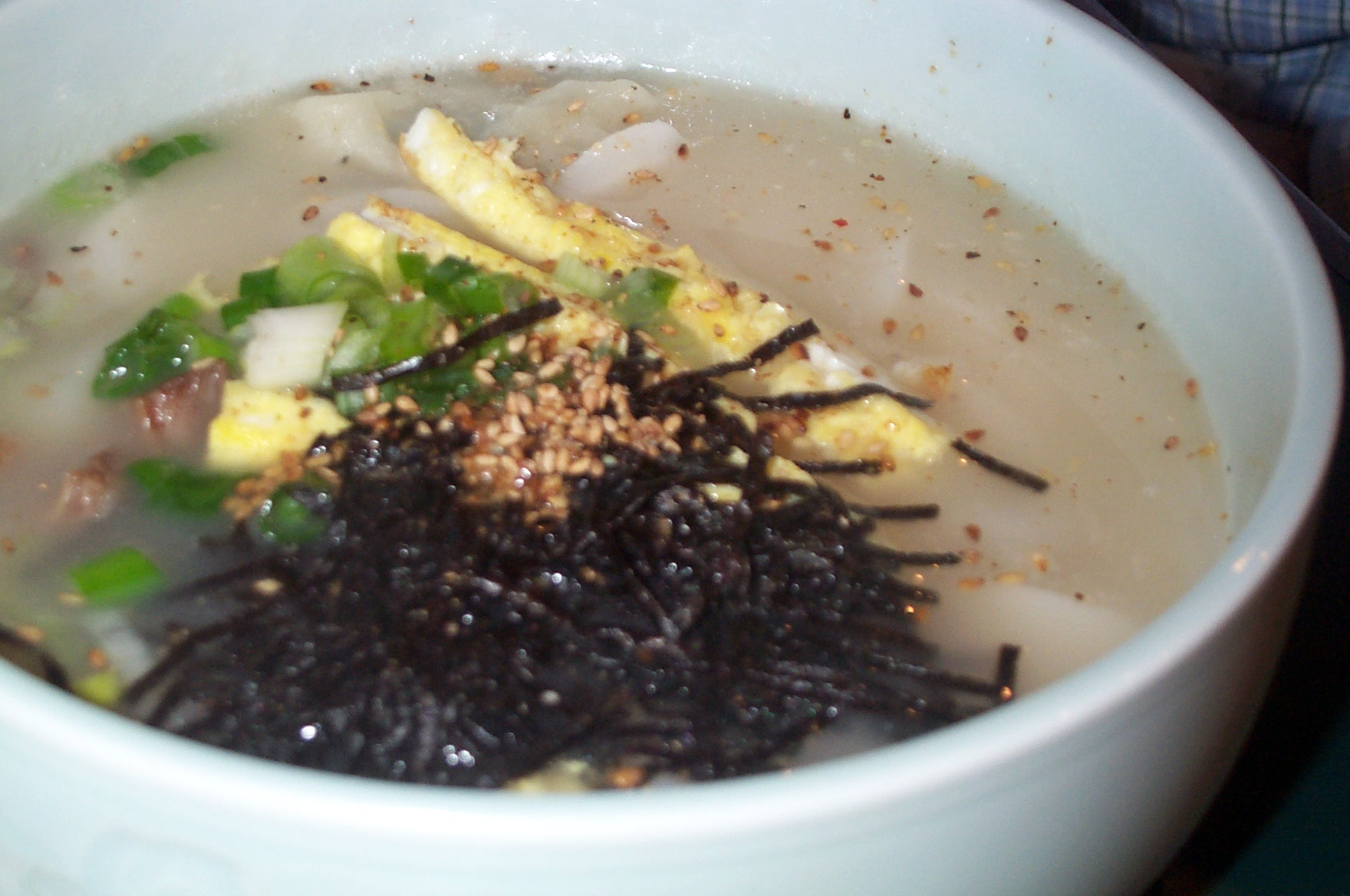
Tteokguk, soup made with tteok, rice cake. It is also called New Year's soup.

Soups are a common part of any Korean meal. Unlike other cultures, in Korean culture, soup is served as part of the main course rather than at the beginning or the end of the meal, as an accompaniment to rice along with other banchan. Soups known as guk are often made with meats, shellfish and vegetables. Soups can be made into more formal soups known as tang, often served as the main dish of the meal. Jjigae are a thicker, heavier seasoned soups or stews.

Some popular types of soups are:

- Malgeunguk (맑은국), are flavoured with ganjang. Small amounts of long boiled meat may be added to the soup, or seafood both fresh and dried may be added, or vegetables may be the main component for the clear soup.
- Doenjang-guk are seasoned with doenjang. Common ingredients for tojang guk include seafood such as clams, dried anchovies, and shrimp. For a spicier soup, gochujang is added.
- Tteok-guk is a rice cake soup commonly made with sliced rice cakes and beef broth. White rice cake was called Baekbyeong (백병-白餠) or Geomo (거모-擧摸). Tteok-guk is made with thinly sliced garae-tteok, are long, cylindrical shaped rice cakes made with rice flour. Tteok-guk is boiled in chicken broth, but was originally boiled in pheasant meat soup. It says, "hunting pheasant is not easy, and since they breed chickens, they use chicken instead of pheasant, and if there's not chicken they even used beef"(꿩 대신 닭). In North Korea, there is a variation of this recipe called joraengi tteokguk where rice cakes are made in the shape of balls. it is eaten on New Year's Day because Koreans believe that if you eat a bowl of tteok-guk on the first of the lunar year, you get one year older. There is the belief that rice cakes in oval shape bring fortune since they resemble old Korean coins known as yeopjeon (엽전).
- Gomguk or gomtang (곰탕), and they are made from boiling beef bones or cartilage. Originating as a peasant dish, all parts of beef are used, including tail, leg and rib bones with or without meat attached; these are boiled in water to extract fat, marrow, and gelatin to create a rich soup. Some versions of this soup may also use the beef head and intestines. The only seasoning generally used in the soup is salt.
- Naengguk, which are cold soups generally eaten during the summer months to cool the diner. A light hand is usually used in the seasoning of these soups usually using ganjang and sesame oil.
- Shin-son-ro (or koo-ja tang), the name of it came from its special cook pot with chimney for burning charcoal. The meaning is a hearth or furnace or a pot for fire or incense burning that always contains nineteen fillings. The nineteen fillings were including beef, fish, eggs, carrot, mushrooms, and onion.

Stews are referred to as jjigae, and are often a shared side dish. Jjigae is often both cooked and served in the glazed earthenware pot (ttukbaegi) in which it is cooked. The most common version of this stew is doenjang jjigae, which is a stew of soybean paste, with many variations; common ingredients include vegetables, saltwater or freshwater fish, and tofu. The stew often changes with the seasons and which ingredients are available. Other common varieties of jjigae contain kimchi (kimchi jjigae) or tofu (sundubu jjigae).

- Miyeok-guk. This soup is made of dried seaweed according to 조선요리제법, it says it is usually made by frying 미역 with beef pouring water and making the soup. Adding mussel can make it taste better. Also in coastal areas they use fish instead of beef too. It is usually consumed on Koreans birthday, specifically on samchil day (삼칠일: a resting period after giving birth to the newborn); baek-il (백일: the 100th day after a baby is born); doljanchi (돌잔치: the baby's first birthday). The Korean tradition of mothers eating seaweed after birth originated in Goguryeo. The Korean word for seaweed, miyeok, originated in Goguryeo.

=== Kimchi ===
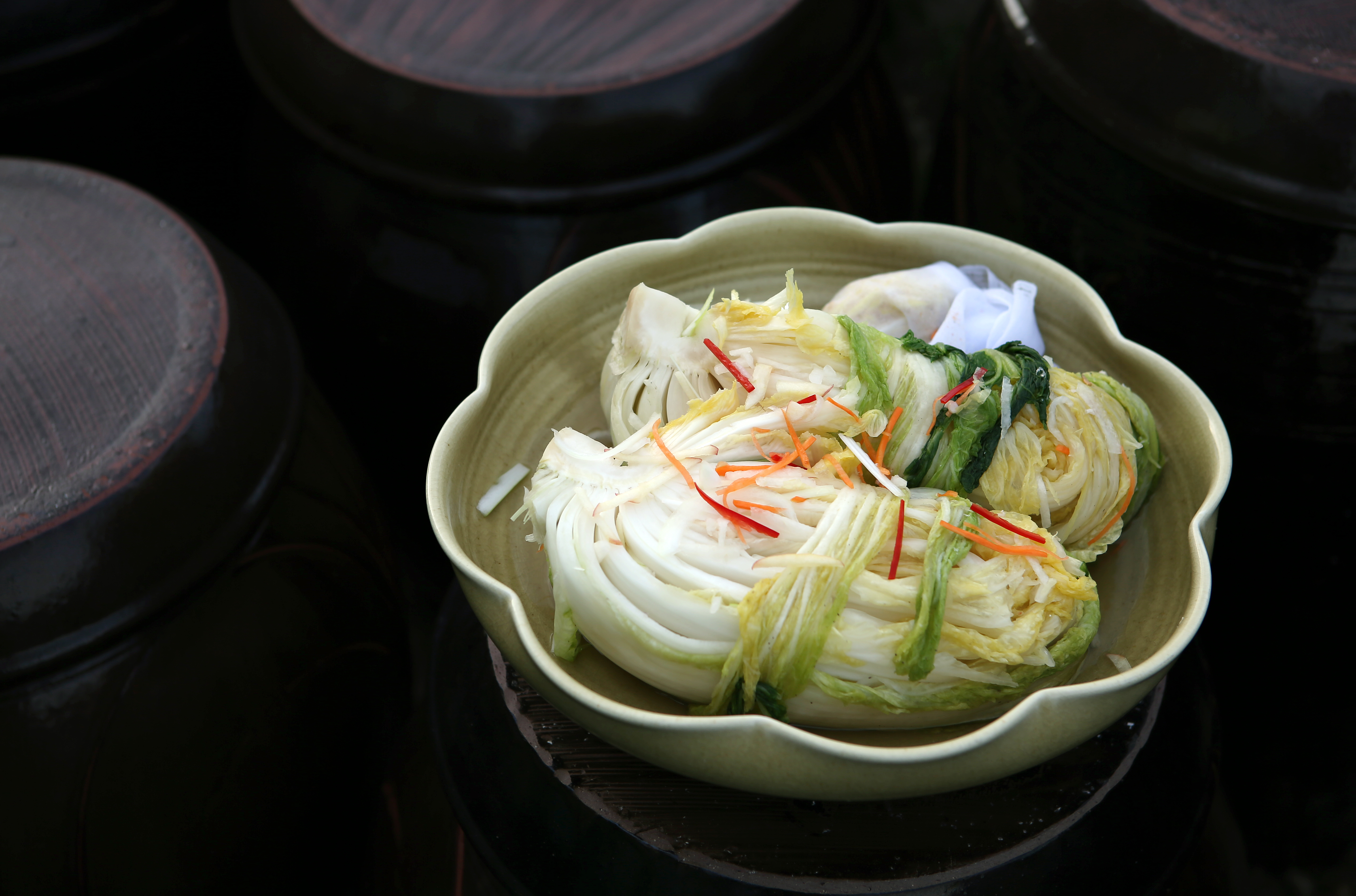
Baek-kimchi

Kimchi refers to often fermented vegetable dishes, usually made with napa cabbage, Korean radish, or sometimes cucumber. There are 4 types of raw materials which are major ones: spices, seasonings, and other additional materials. Red and black pepper, cinnamon, garlic, ginger, onion, and mustard are the example of spices. There are endless varieties with regional variations, and it is served as a side dish or cooked into soups and rice dishes. In the late 15th century, it depicted Korean's custom that Korean ancestors buried kimchi jars in the ground for storage for the entire winter season, as fermented foods can keep for several years. These were stored in traditional Korean mud pots known as jangdokdae, although with the advent of refrigerators, special kimchi freezers and commercially produced kimchi, this practice has become less common. Kimchi is a vegetable-based food which includes low calorie, low fat, and no cholesterol. Also, it is a rich source of various vitamins and minerals. It contains vitamins such as vitamin A, vitamin B, vitamin C, and vitamin K and minerals which are calcium, iron, phosphorus, and selenium. The same lactobacilli bacteria found in yogurt and other fermented dairy products are also found in kimchi. In 2021, Koreans collectively consumed 1,965,000 tons of Kimchi, with average Korean consuming 88.3 grams of Kimchi daily.

=== Noodles ===
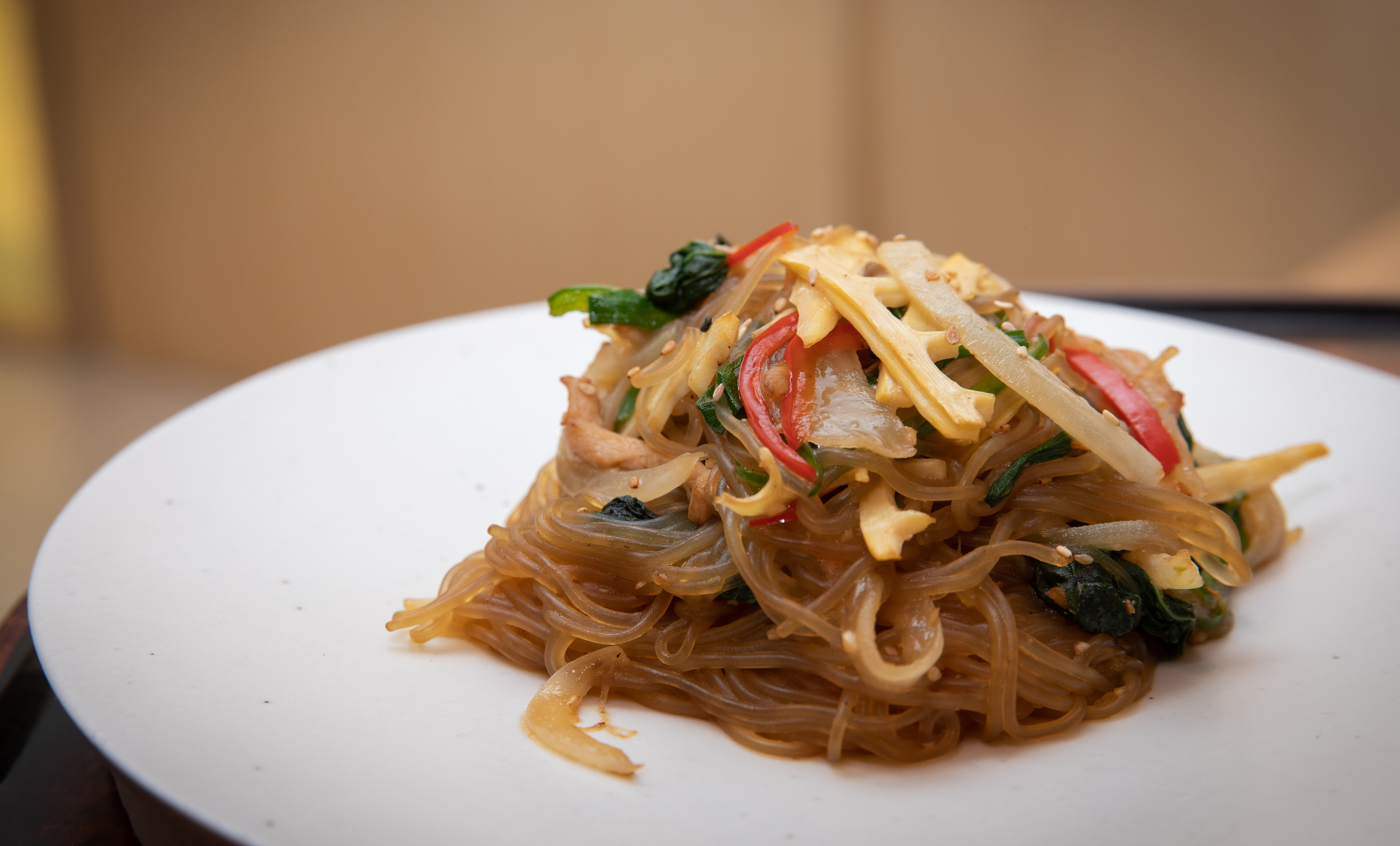
Japchae, a kind of Korean noodle dish made with marinated beef and vegetables in soy sauce and sesame oil.

Noodles or noodle dishes in Korean cuisine are collectively referred to as guksu in native Korean or myeon in hanja. While noodles were eaten in Korea from ancient times, productions of wheat was less than other crops, so wheat noodles did not become a daily food until 1945. Wheat noodles (milguksu) were specialty foods for birthdays, weddings or auspicious occasions because the long and continued shape were thought to be associated with the bliss for longevity and long-lasting marriage.

In Korean traditional noodle dishes are onmyeon or guksu jangguk (noodles with a hot clear broth), naengmyeon (cold buckwheat noodles), bibim guksu (cold noodle dish mixed with vegetables), kalguksu (knife-cut noodles), kongguksu (noodles with a cold soybean broth), japchae (cellophane noodles made from sweet potato with various vegetables) and others. In royal court, baekmyeon (literally "white noodles") consisting of buckwheat noodles and pheasant broth, was regarded as the top quality noodle dish. Naengmyeon with a cold soup mixed with dongchimi (watery radish kimchi) and beef brisket broth was eaten in court during summer.

- Jajangmyeon, a staple Koreanized Chinese noodle dish, is extremely popular in Korea as fast, take-out food. It is made with a black bean sauce usually fried with diced pork or seafood and a variety of vegetables, including zucchini and potatoes. It is popularly ordered and delivered, like Chinese take-out food in other parts of the world.
- Ramyeon refers to Korean instant noodles similar to ramen.
- Japchae is a dish made by inserting in boiling water roasted vegetables, mushrooms and meat, each of them roasted. This is one of the most popular dishes in Korean tradition enjoyed on special occasion like weddings, holidays and birthday. There are two types of Japchae, one that includes glass noodles and another without noodles. According to the Korean cookbook Diminbang 음식디미방 (around 1670), there is only the recipe without glass noodles. The original recipe without glass noodles is made by boiling vegetables such as cucumbers, pine mushrooms, bean sprouts, bellflowers green onion, then they are sprinkled with ginger, pepper, sesame oil, and flour. The sauce is made by boiling minced pink meat and soybean paste that is lightly filtered with sesame oil and flour. To match the name more than 20 ingredients were used. In Gyongon Yoram [규곤요람閨壼要覽 (1896)] is also recorded japchae seasoned with mustard sauce without glass noodles. However, since the 1930s, appears the japchae recipe with glass noodles alongside the original recipe. Also, during the Joseon dynasty [조선요리법朝鮮料理法] the recipe of japchae, with and without glass noodles, was added to the cookbook. Also, there is also a variant of japchae with meat, or one with abalone or other seafood in 1930s.It is a local food that shows the traditional recipe. In the Jinju region, Jamung-sam, Yokimun, is a local dish with soy sauce and sesame oil, and the seafood, such as octopus, skates, and mixed several vegetables stained in oil. Because it uses various ingredients, it has high calorie, protein, fat, vitamin, mineral, and sufficient nutritional. It is the first item to choose when you want a feast table.

=== Banchan ===
Banchan is a term referring collectively to side dishes in Korean cuisine. Soups and stews are not considered banchan.

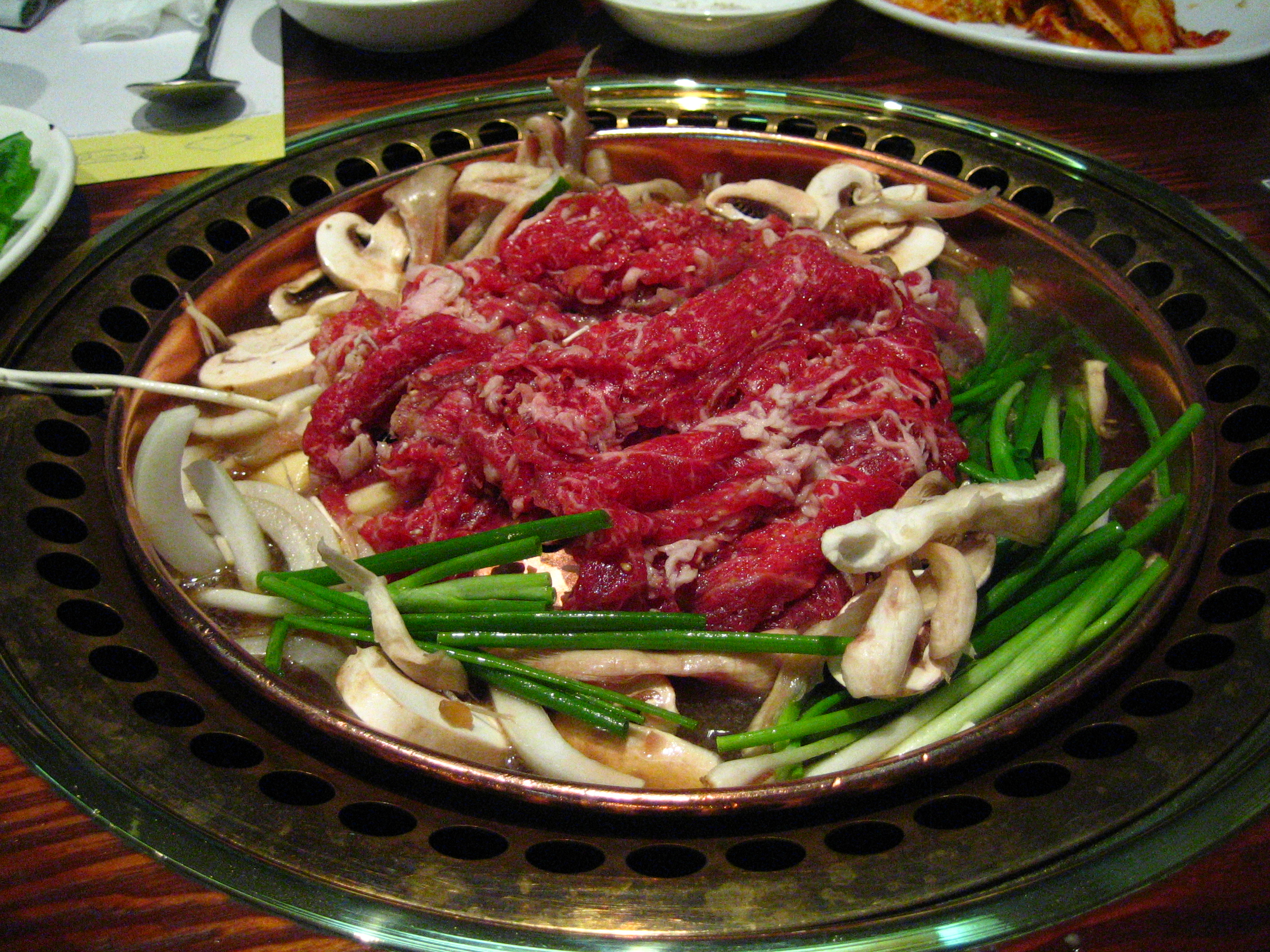
Bulgogi, a grilled Korean dish; the meat and vegetables shown here have not yet been grilled.

Gui are grilled dishes, which most commonly have meat or fish as their primary ingredient, but may in some cases also comprise grilled vegetables or other vegetable ingredients. At traditional restaurants, meats are cooked at the center of the table over a charcoal grill, surrounded by various banchan and individual rice bowls. The cooked meat is then cut into small pieces and wrapped with fresh lettuce leaves, with rice, thinly sliced garlic, ssamjang (a mixture of gochujang and dwenjang), and other seasonings. The suffix gui is often omitted in the names of meat-based gui such as galbi, the name of which was originally galbi gui.

Jjim and seon (steamed dishes) are generic terms referring to steamed or boiled dishes in Korean cuisine. However, the former is made with meat or seafood-based ingredients marinated in gochujang or ganjang while seon is made with vegetable stuffed with fillings.

Hoe (raw dishes): although the term originally referred to any kind of raw dish, it is generally used to refer to saengseonhweh (생선회, raw fish dishes). It is dipped in gochujang, or soy sauce with wasabi, and served with lettuce or perilla leaves.

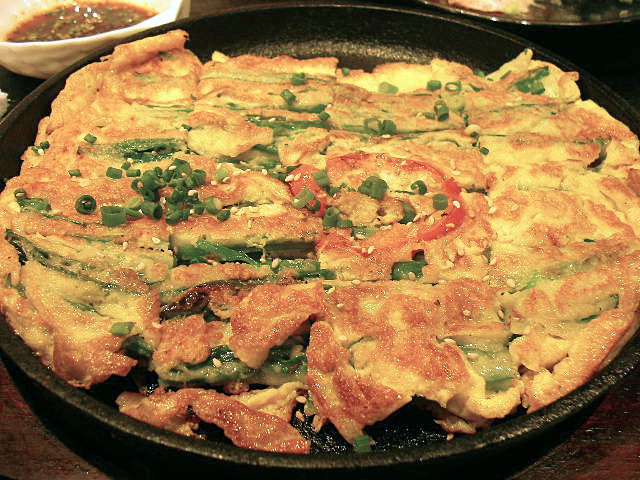
Bindaeddeok

Jeon (or buchimgae) is a Korean savory pancake made from various ingredients. Chopped kimchi or seafood is mixed into a wheat flour-based batter, and then pan fried. This dish is typically dipped in a mixture of soy sauce, vinegar, and red pepper powder. It can be served as an appetizer, side dish (banchan) or accompanied by alcohol (anju).

There are some sweet varieties called Hwajeon (화전) which means flower pancakes.

Cooking oils such as soy and corn are used today, though technology required for producing these oils was not available during the Joseon dynasty.

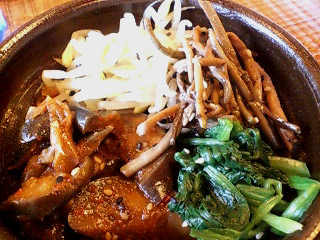
Namul

Namul may refer to either saengchae (생채, literally "fresh vegetables") or sukchae (숙채, literally "heated vegetables"), although the term generally indicates the latter. Saengchae is mostly seasoned with vinegar, chili pepper powder and salt to give a tangy and refreshing taste. On the other hand, sukchae (숙채) is blanched and seasoned with soy sauce, sesame oil, chopped garlic, or sometimes chili pepper powder.

=== Anju (side dishes accompanying alcoholic beverages) ===
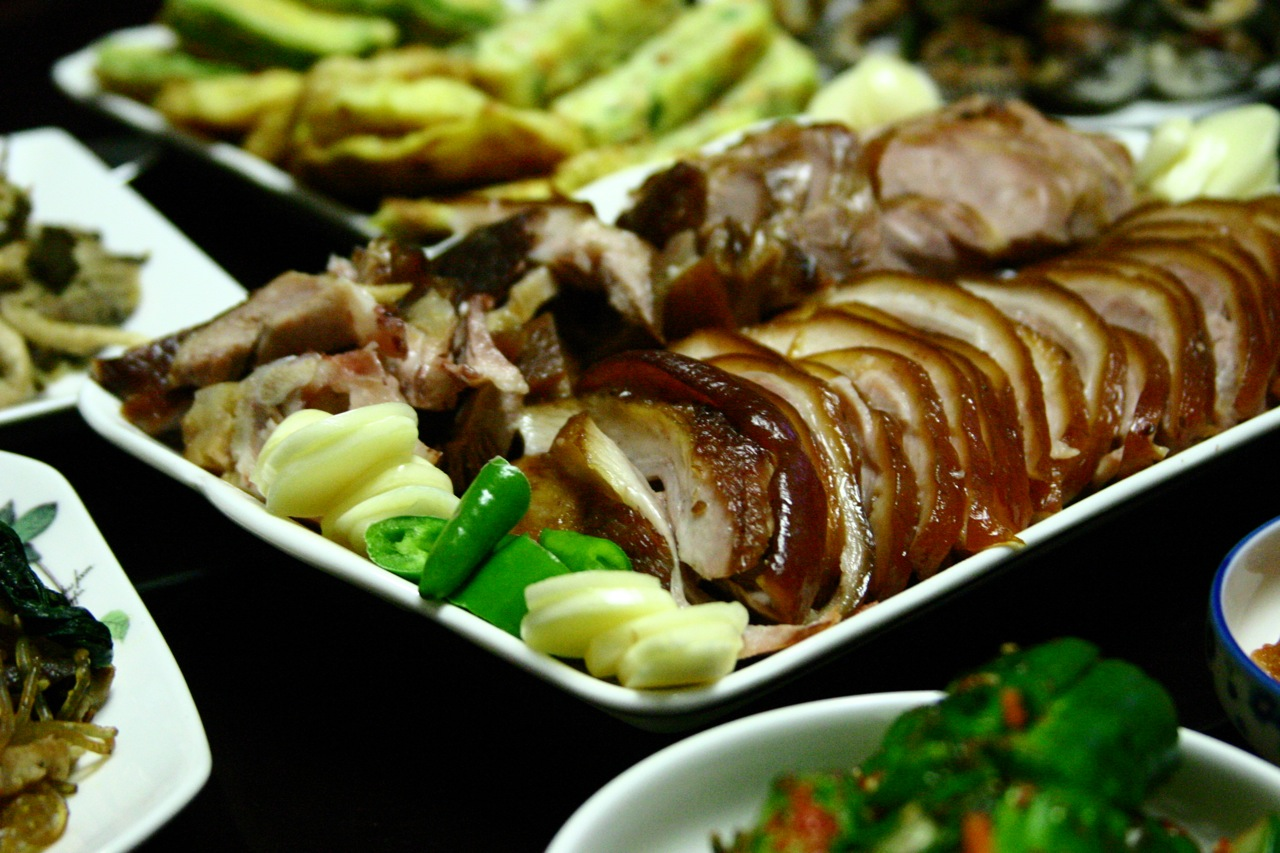
Jokbal : pig's feet, a type of Anju.

Anju is a general term for a Korean side dish consumed with alcohol. It matches well with Korean traditional alcohol such as soju or makgeolli and helps people to enjoy their drinking more. Some examples of anju include steamed squid with gochujang, assorted fruit, dubu kimchi (tofu with kimchi), peanuts, odeng/ohmuk, sora (소라) (a kind of shellfish popular in street food tents), nakji (small octopus), and Jokbal (pig's leg served with salted shrimp sauce). Samgyupsal (pork belly) is also considered anju with soju. Most Korean foods can be considered anju, as the food consumed alongside the alcohol depends on the diner's taste and preferences.

== Holiday food ==
=== Songpyeon ===
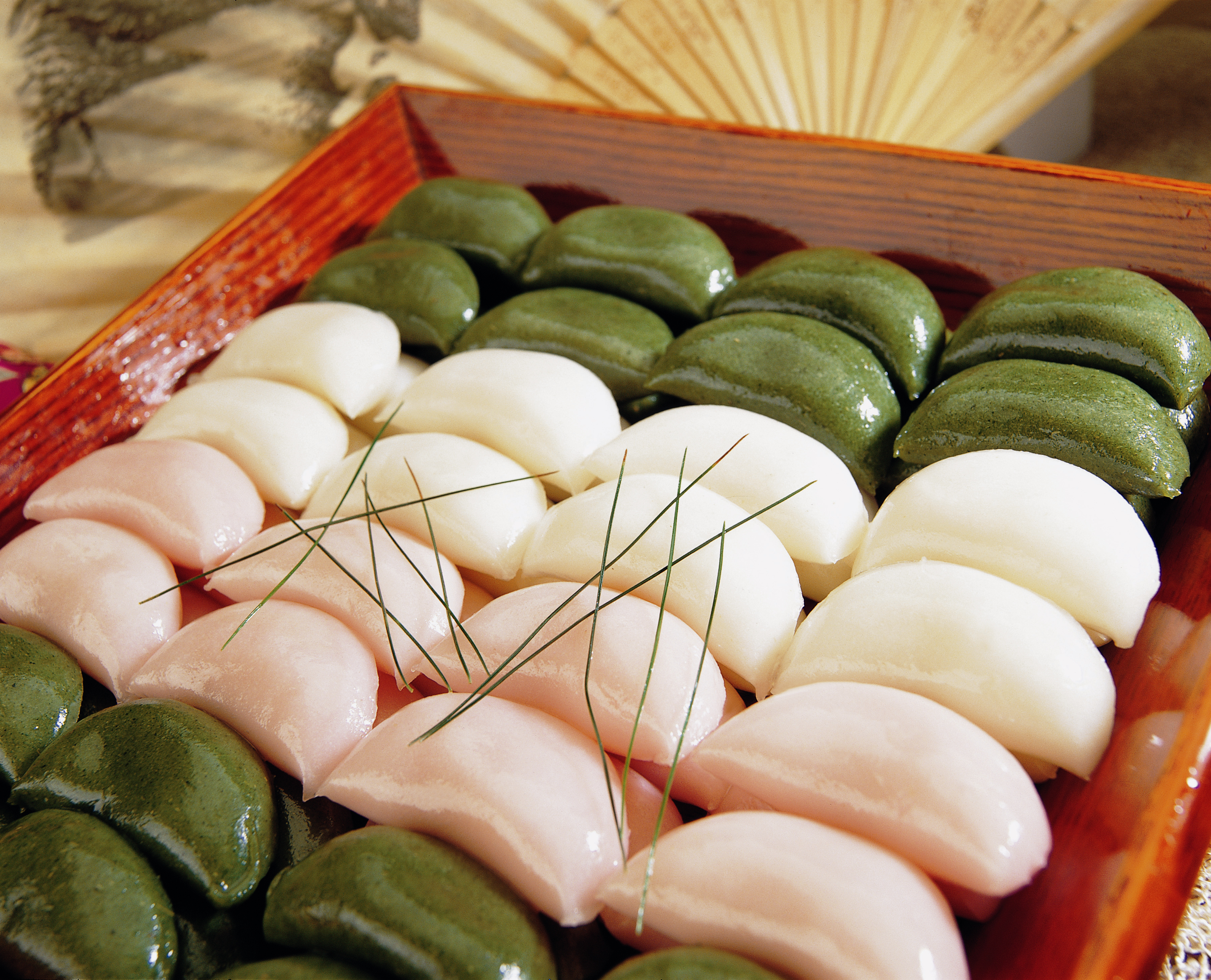
Songpyeon

Songpyeon are half-moon shaped rice cakes that are mostly eaten during Chuseok to express gratitude towards ancestors. They are steamed over a layer of pine needles and typically contain sweet or semi-sweet fillings such as sesame seeds or red bean paste.

Records of songpyeon appear from the 17th century onward. It is said in『Yorok 要 錄』, "Make rice cakes with white rice flour, steam them with pine and pine needles and wash them off with water." Initially songpyeon were made simply with white rice powder . It is said that "red beans, pine nuts, walnuts, ginger and cinnamon" were added in the "Buyin Pilji 婦人 必 知".

In『Korean Rice Cakes, Hangwa, Eumcheongryu, "In mountainous regions such as Gangwon-do and Chungcheong-do, potato songpyeon, acorn songpyeon and songgisongpyeon have been prepared and eaten. In the coastal areas of Hamgyeong-do, Pyeongan-do and Gyeonggi-do, shellfish songpyeon was produced and eaten, and in the southern regions of Jeolla-do and Gyeongsang-do, songpyeon with moss leaves was produced and eaten."

=== Ogok-bap ===
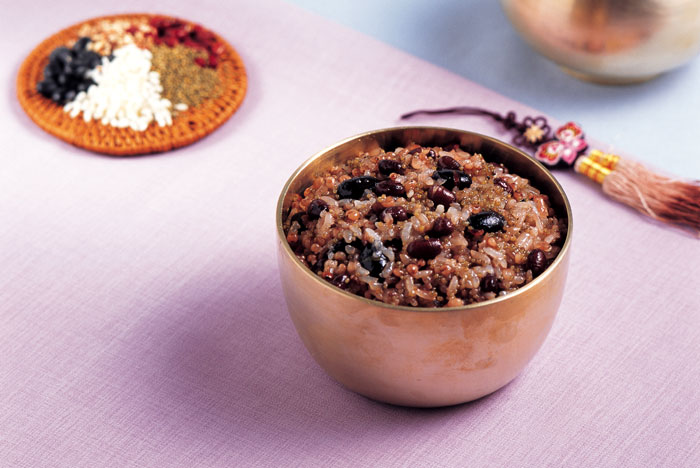
Ogok-bap

Ogok-bap means five rice dish, which consists of rice mixed with glutinous rice, cornstarch, red bean, perilla, and soybean. Traditionally, the five grains are associated with the colors blue, red, yellow, white, and black, are believed to represent the energy of the five elements. Eating Ogok-bap is traditionally associated with wishes for good health, prosperity and protection from misfortune.

== Beverages ==
=== Non-alcoholic beverages ===
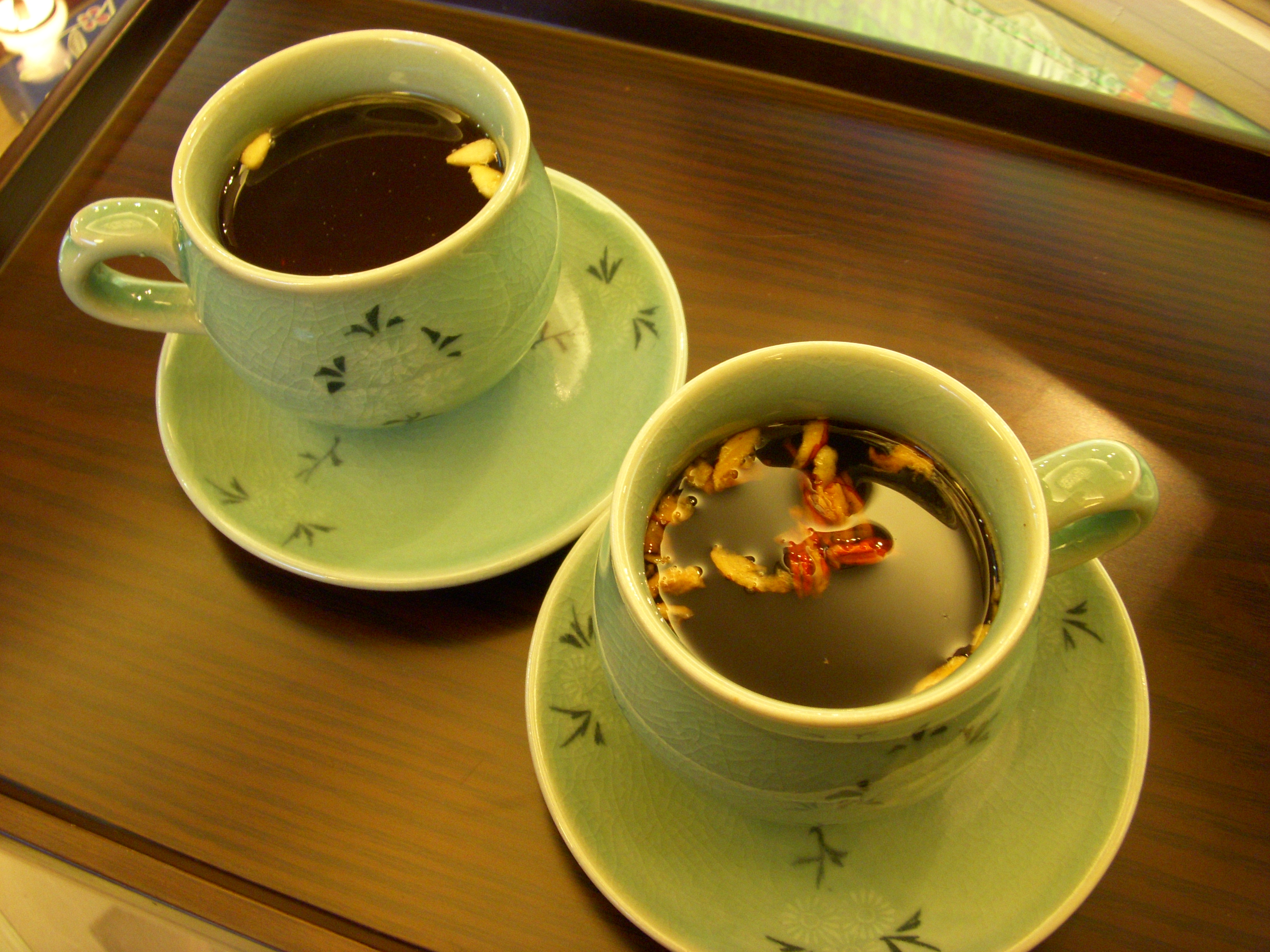
Daechu cha (jujube tea)

All Korean traditional nonalcoholic beverages are referred to as eumcheong or eumcheongnyu (음청류 飮淸類) which literally means "clear beverages". According to historical documents regarding Korean cuisine, 193 items of eumcheongnyu are recorded. Eumcheongnyu can be divided into the following categories: tea, hwachae (fruit punch), sikhye (sweet rice drink), sujeonggwa (persimmon punch), tang (탕, boiled water), jang (장, fermented grain juice with a sour taste), suksu (숙수, beverage made of herbs), galsu (갈수, drink made of fruit extract, and Oriental medicine), honeyed water, juice and milk by their ingredient materials and preparation methods. Among the varieties, tea, hwachae, sikhye, and sujeonggwa are still widely favored and consumed; however, the others almost disappeared by the end of the 20th century.

In Korean cuisine, tea, or cha, refers to various types of herbal tea that can be served hot or cold. Not necessarily related to the leaves, leaf buds, and internodes of the Camellia sinensis plant, they are made from diverse substances, including fruits (e.g. yuja-cha), flowers (e.g. gukhwa-cha), leaves, roots, and grains (e.g. bori-cha, hyeonmi-cha) or herbs and substances used in traditional Korean medicine, such as ginseng (e.g. insam-cha) and ginger (e.g. saenggang-cha).

=== Alcoholic beverages ===
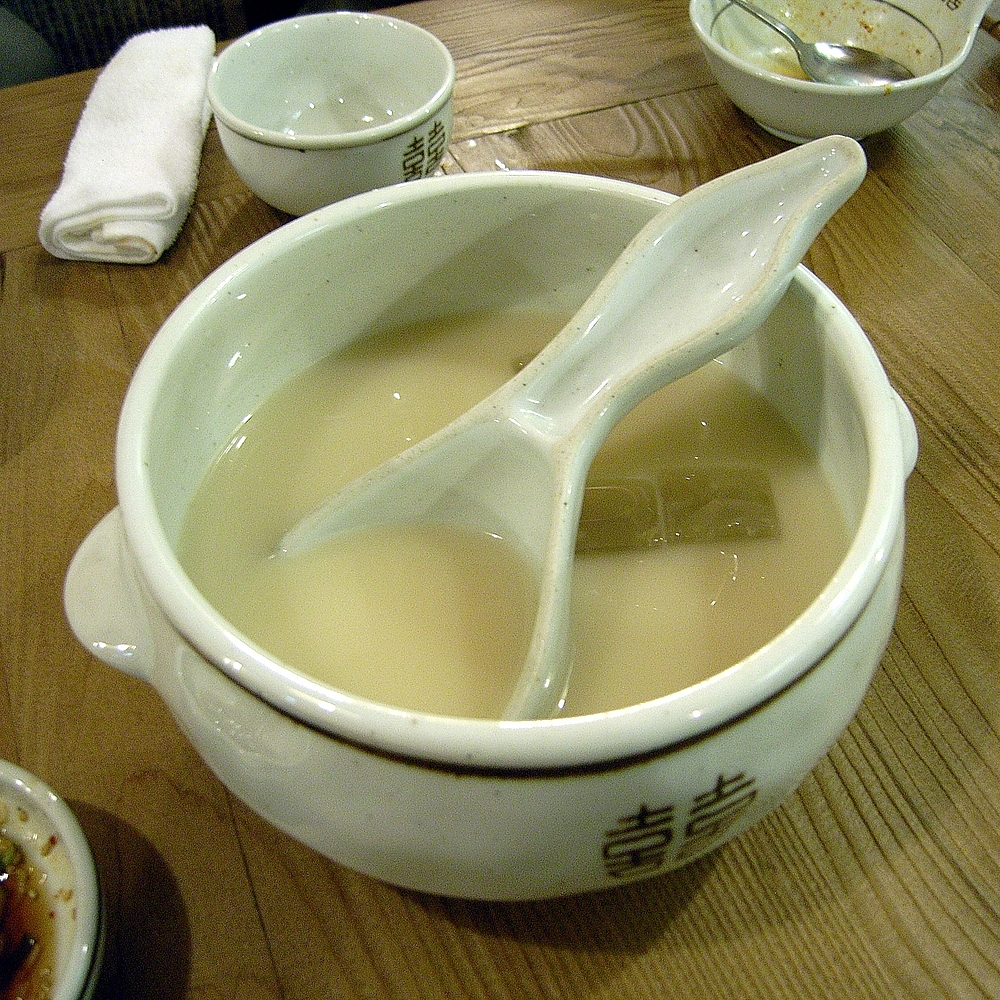
A bowl of makgeolli, a type of takju

While soju is the best known liquor, there are well over 100 different alcoholic beverages, such as beers, rice and fruit wines, and liquors produced in South Korea as well as a sweet rice drink. The top-selling domestic beers (maekju in Korean) are lagers, which differ from Western beers in that they are brewed from rice, rather than barley. Consequently, Korean beers are lighter, sweeter and have less head than their Western counterparts. The South Korean beer market is dominated by the two major breweries: Hite and OB. Taedonggang is a North Korean beer produced at a brewery based in Pyongyang since 2002. Microbrewery beers and bars are growing in popularity after 2002.

Soju is a clear spirit which was originally made from grain, especially rice, and is now also made from sweet potatoes or barley. Soju made from grain is considered superior (as is also the case with grain vs. potato vodka). Soju is around 22% ABV, and is a favorite beverage of hard-up college students, hard-drinking businessmen, and blue-collar workers.

Yakju is a refined pure liquor fermented from rice, with the best known being cheongju. Takju is a thick unrefined liquor made with grains, with the best known being makgeolli, a white, milky rice wine traditionally drunk by farmers.

In addition to the rice wine, various fruit wines and herbal wines exist in Korean cuisine. Acacia, maesil plum, Chinese quince, cherry, pine cone, and pomegranate are most popular. Majuang wine (a blended wine of Korean grapes with French or American wines) and ginseng-based wines are also available.

== Sweets ==
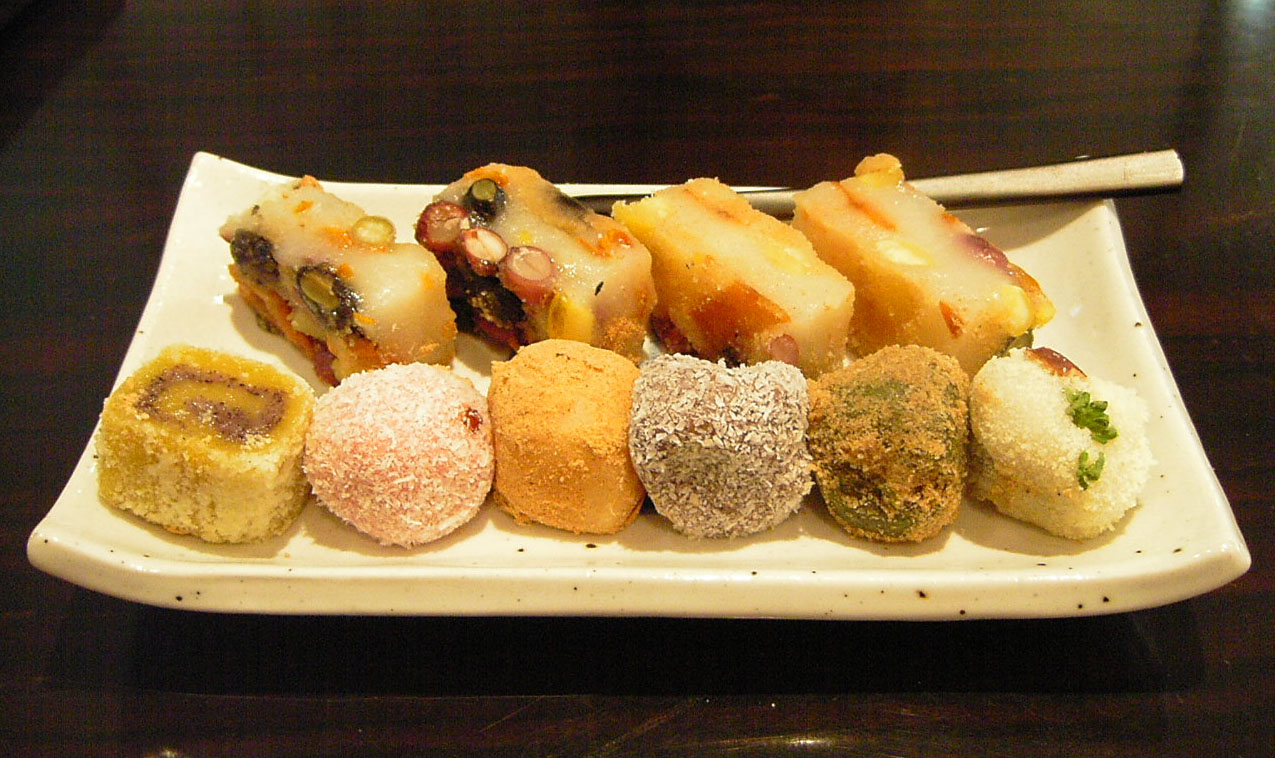
Tteok

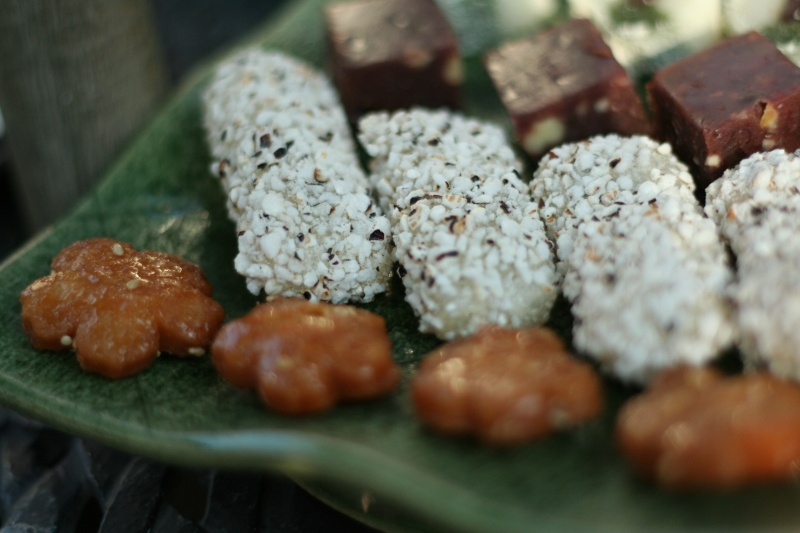
Various hahngwa

Traditional rice cakes, tteok and Korean confectionery hangwa are eaten as treats during holidays and festivals. Tteok refers to all kinds of rice cakes made from either pounded rice (메떡, metteok), pounded glutinous rice (찰떡, chaltteok), or glutinous rice left whole, without pounding. It is served either filled or covered with sweetened mung bean paste, red bean paste, mashed red beans, raisins, a sweetened filling made with sesame seeds, sweet pumpkin, beans, jujubes, pine nuts or honey). Tteok is usually served as dessert or as a snack. Among varieties, songpyeon is a chewy stuffed tteok served at Chuseok. Honey or another soft sweet material such as sweetened sesame or black beans are used as fillings. Pine needles can be used for imparting flavor during the steaming process. Yaksik is a sweet rice cake made with glutinous rice, chestnuts, pine nuts, jujubes, and other ingredients, while chapssaltteok is a tteok filled with sweet bean paste.

On the other hand, hangwa is a general term referring to all types of Korean traditional confectionery. The ingredients of hahngwa mainly consist of grain flour, honey, yeot, and sugar, or of fruit and edible roots. Hangwa is largely divided into yumilgwa (fried confectionery), suksilgwa, jeonggwa, gwapyeon, dasik (tea food) and yeot. Yumilgwa is made by stir frying or frying pieces of dough, such as maejakgwa and yakgwa. Maejakgwa is a ring-shaped confection made of wheat flour, vegetable oil, cinnamon, ginger juice, jocheong, and pine nuts, while yakgwa, literally "medicinal confectionery", is a flower-shaped biscuit made of honey, sesame oil and wheat flour.

Suksilgwa is made by boiling fruits, ginger, or nuts in water, and then forming the mix into the original fruit's shape, or other shapes. Gwapyeon is a jelly-like confection made by boiling sour fruits, starch, and sugar. Dasik, literally "eatery for tea", is made by kneading rice flour, honey, and various types of flour from nuts, herbs, sesame, or jujubes. Jeonggwa, or jeongwa, is made by boiling fruits, plant roots and seeds in honey, mullyeot (물엿, liquid candy) or sugar. It is similar to marmalade or jam/jelly. Yeot is a Korean traditional candy in liquid or solid form made from steamed rice, glutinous rice, glutinous kaoliang, corn, sweet potatoes or mixed grains. The steamed ingredients are lightly fermented and boiled in a large pot called sot (솥) for a long time.

Yugwa and Yakgwa. They are traditional desserts enjoyed during Chuseok, marriage or the sixtieth birthday.

== Regional and variant cuisines ==
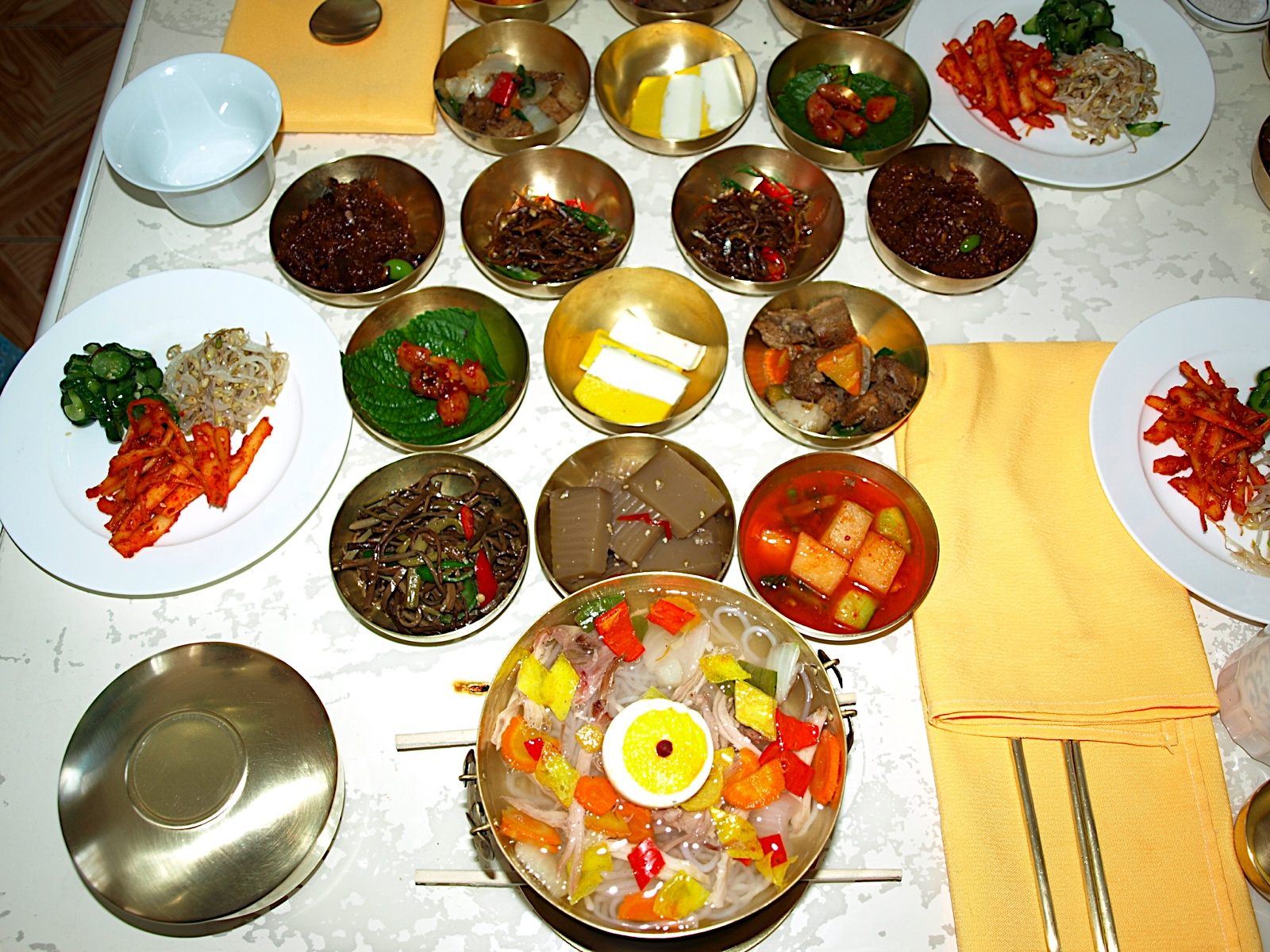
A traditional meal in Kaesong, North Korea.

Korean regional cuisines (향토음식; hyangtoeumsik) are characterized by local specialties and distinctive styles within Korean cuisine. The divisions reflected historical boundaries of the provinces where these food and culinary traditions were preserved until modern times.

Although Korea has been divided into two nation-states since 1948 (North Korea and South Korea), it was once divided into eight provinces (paldo) according to the Joseon administrative districts. The northern region consisted of Hamgyeong Province, Pyeongan Province and Hwanghae Province. The central region comprised Gyeonggi Province, Chungcheong Province, and Gangwon Province. Gyeongsang Province and Jeolla Province made up the southern region.

Until the late 19th century, transportation networks were not well developed, and each provincial region preserved its own characteristic tastes and cooking methods. Geographic differences are also reflected by the local specialty foodstuffs depending on the climate and types of agriculture, as well as the natural foods available. With the modern development of transportation and the introduction of foreign foods, Korean regional cuisines have tended to overlap and integrate. However, many unique traditional dishes in Korean regional cuisine have been handed down through the generations.

=== Buddhist cuisine ===
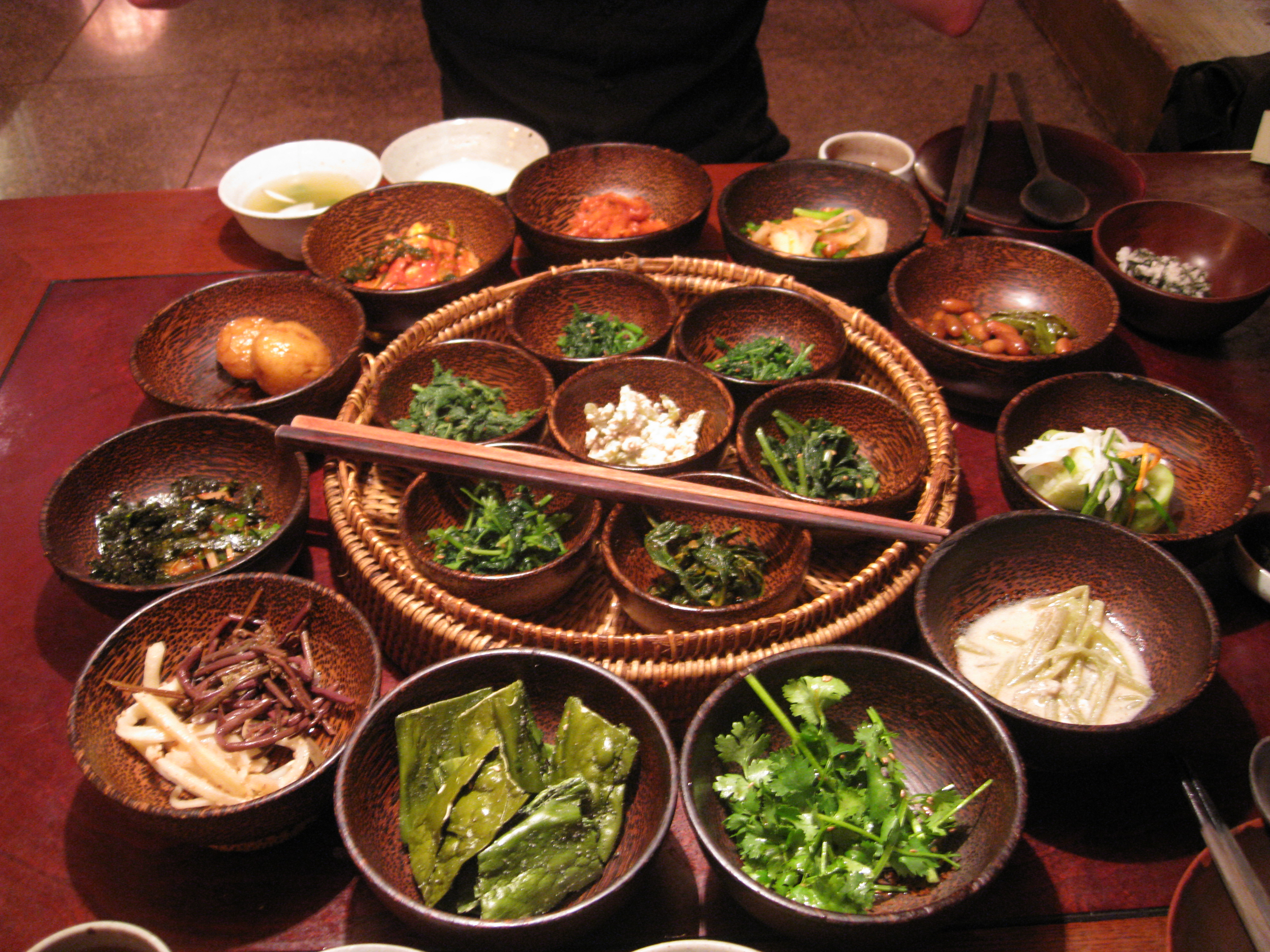
Korean temple cuisine at Sanchon, a restaurant located in Insadong, Seoul.

Korean temple cuisine originated in Buddhist temples of Korea. Since Buddhism was introduced into Korea, Buddhist traditions have strongly influenced Korean cuisine, as well. During the Silla period (57 BCE – 935 CE), chalbap (찰밥, a bowl of cooked glutinous rice) yakgwa (a fried dessert) and yumilgwa (a fried and puffed rice snack) were served for Buddhist altars and have been developed into types of hangwa, Korean traditional confectionery. During the Goryeo period, sangchu ssam (wraps made with lettuce), yaksik, and yakgwa were developed, and since spread to China and other countries. Since the Joseon dynasty, Buddhist cuisine has been established in Korea according to regions and temples.

On the other hand, royal court cuisine is closely related to Korean temple cuisine. In the past, when the royal court maids, sanggung, who were assigned to Suragan (수라간; 水剌間; the name of the royal kitchen), where they prepared the king's meals, became old, they had to leave the royal palace. Therefore, many of them entered Buddhist temples to become nuns. As a result, culinary techniques and recipes of the royal cuisine were integrated into Buddhist cuisine.

=== Vegetarian cuisine ===
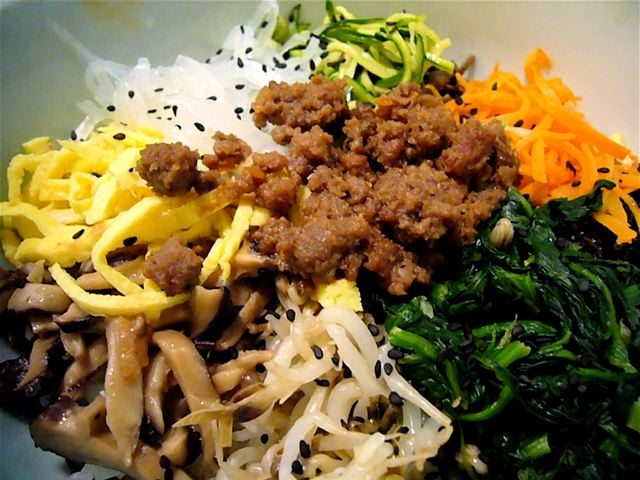
Closeup of the ingredients in goldongban or bibimbap

Vegetarian cookery in Korea may be linked to the Buddhist traditions that influenced Korean culture from the Goryeo dynasty onwards. There are hundreds of vegetarian restaurants in Korea, although historically they have been local restaurants that are unknown to tourists. Most have buffets, with cold food, and vegetarian kimchi and tofu being the main features. Bibimbap is a common vegan dish. Menus change with seasons. Wine with the alcohol removed and fine teas are also served. The Korean tea ceremony is suitable for all vegetarians and vegans, and began with Buddhist influences. All food is eaten with a combination of stainless steel oval chopsticks and a long-handled shallow spoon called together sujeo.

=== Ceremonial food ===
Food is an important part of traditions of Korean family ceremonies, which are mainly based on the Confucian culture. Gwan Hon Sang Je (관혼상제; 冠婚喪祭), the four family ceremonies (coming-of-age ceremony, wedding, funeral, and ancestral rite) have been considered especially important and elaborately developed, continuing to influence Korean life to these days. Ceremonial food in Korea has developed with variation across different regions and cultures.

For example, ancestral rites called jesa are mainly held on the anniversary of an ancestor's death. Ritual food includes rice, rice cakes, meat and fish, alcohol, and fruit.

=== Street food ===
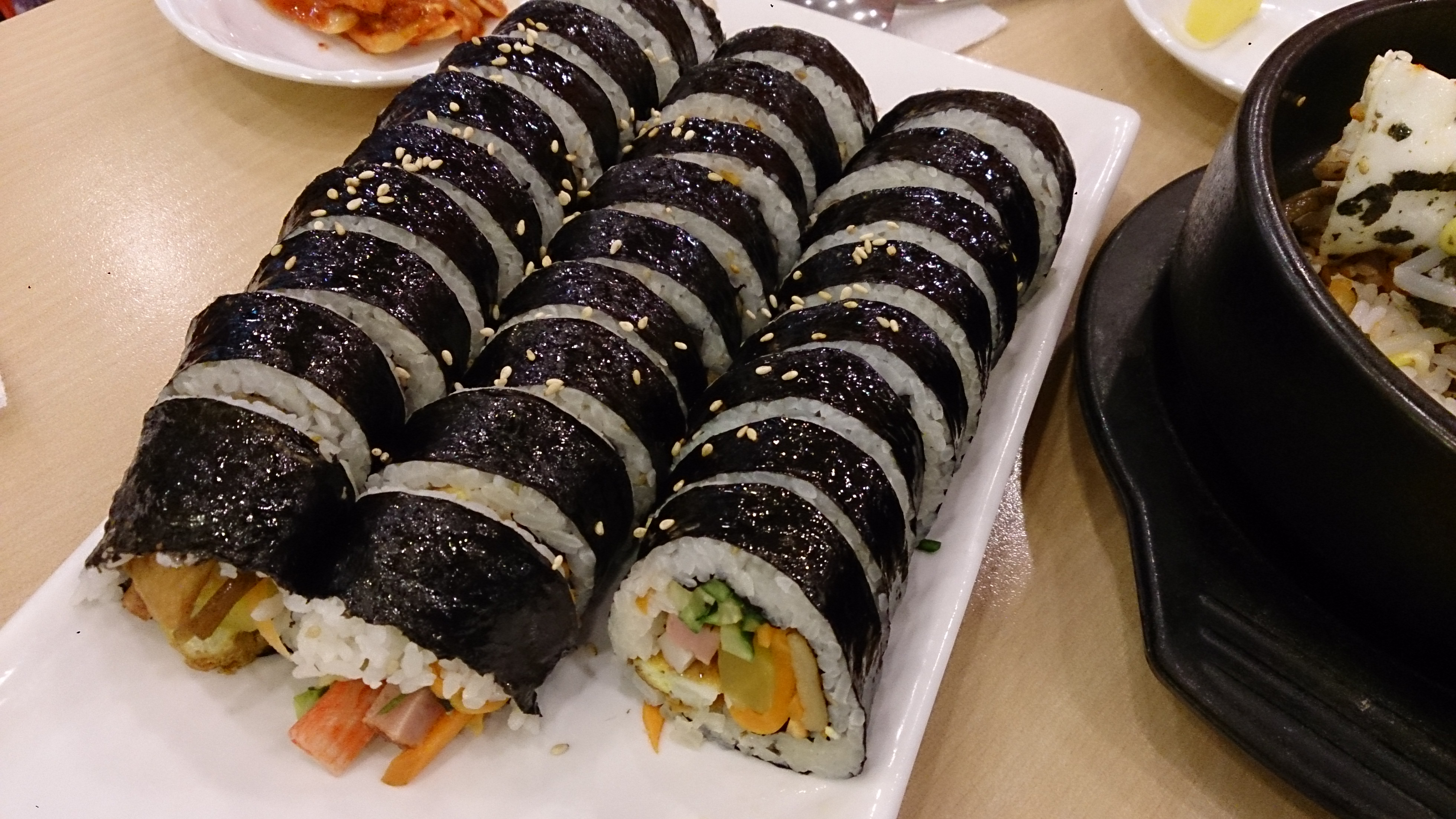
Gimbap, rice (bap) and various filler ingredients, rolled in sheets of dried seaweed (gim)

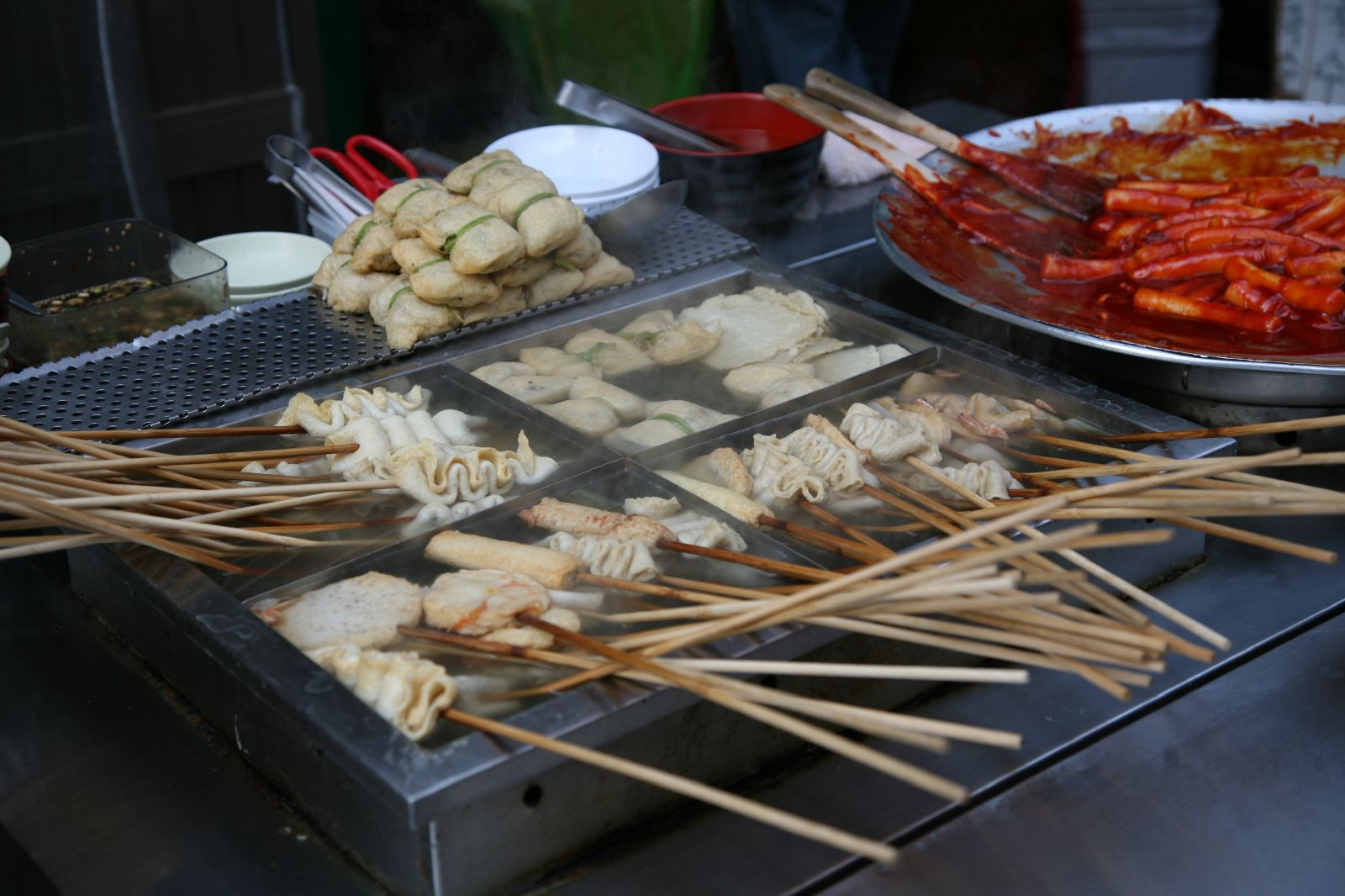
Korea Street Food tteokbokki (떡볶이) and Eomuk (어묵; 오뎅)

In South Korea, inexpensive food may be purchased from pojangmacha, street carts during the day, where customers may eat standing beside the cart or have their food wrapped up to take home. At night, pojangmacha (포장마차) become small tents that sell food, drinks, and alcoholic beverages.

Seasonal street foods include hotteok and bungeoppang, which are enjoyed in autumn and winter. Gyeran-ppang and hoppang are also enjoyed in winter.

Other common street foods include gimbap (김밥), tteokbokki (떡볶이), sundae, twigim, and eomuk. Dak-kkochi (닭꼬치), or skewered chicken grilled in various sauces, is also popular. Beondegi (번데기) and dalgona/ppopgi (뽑기) are two examples of original street foods many people have enjoyed since childhood.

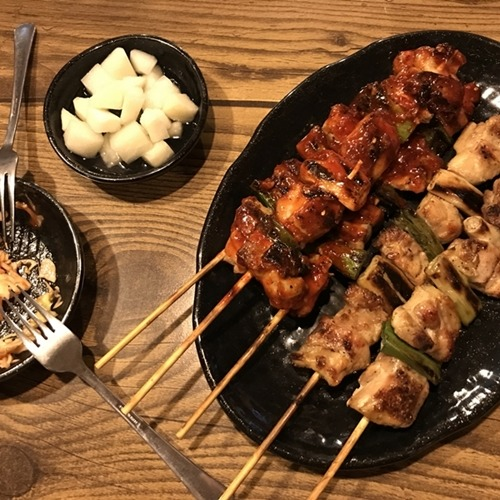
Dak-kkochi, Korean chicken skewers consisting of grilled small pieces of chicken.

== Etiquette ==
=== Dining ===
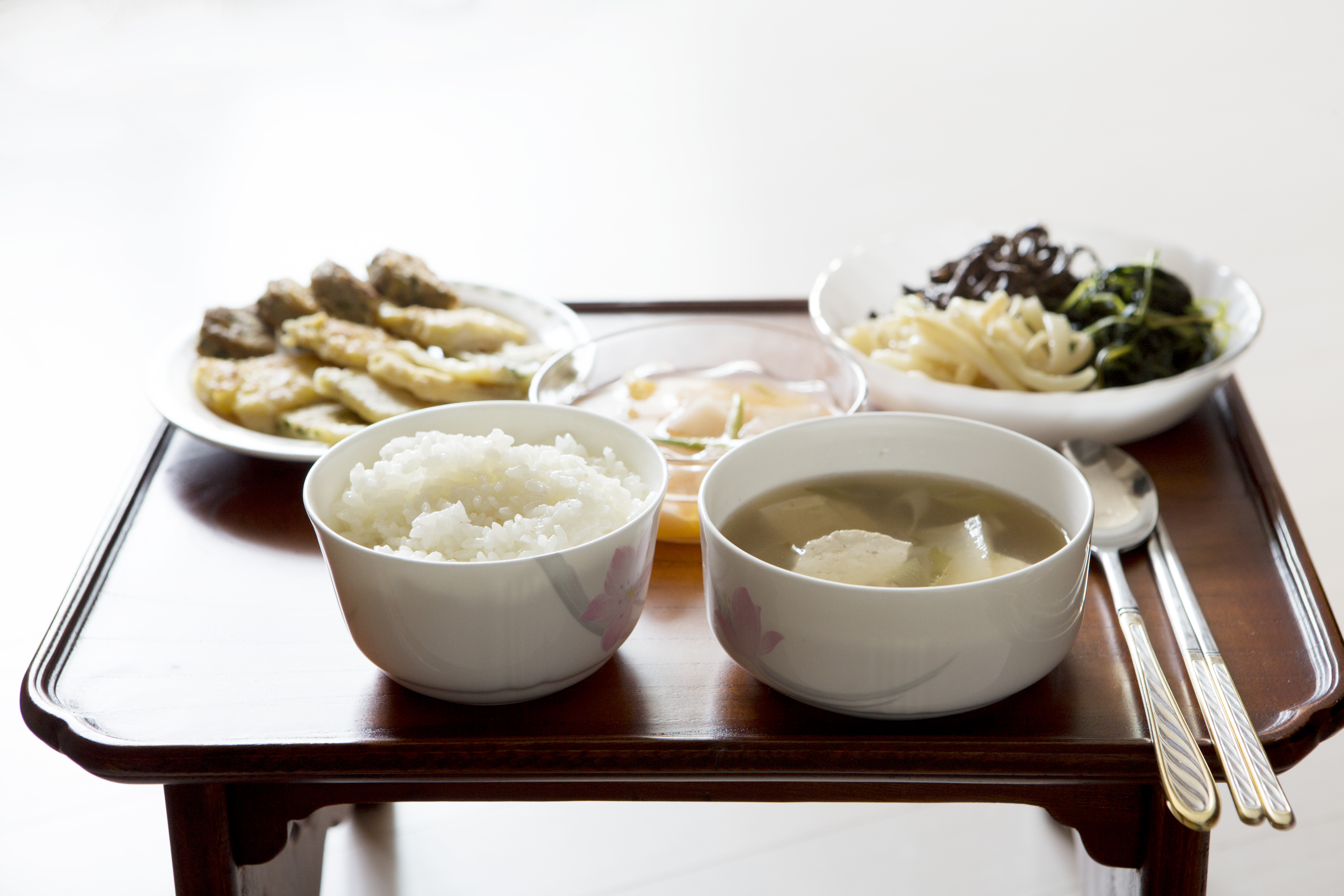
A single-person bapsang (meal table). Each person was given a table in a traditional dining setting.

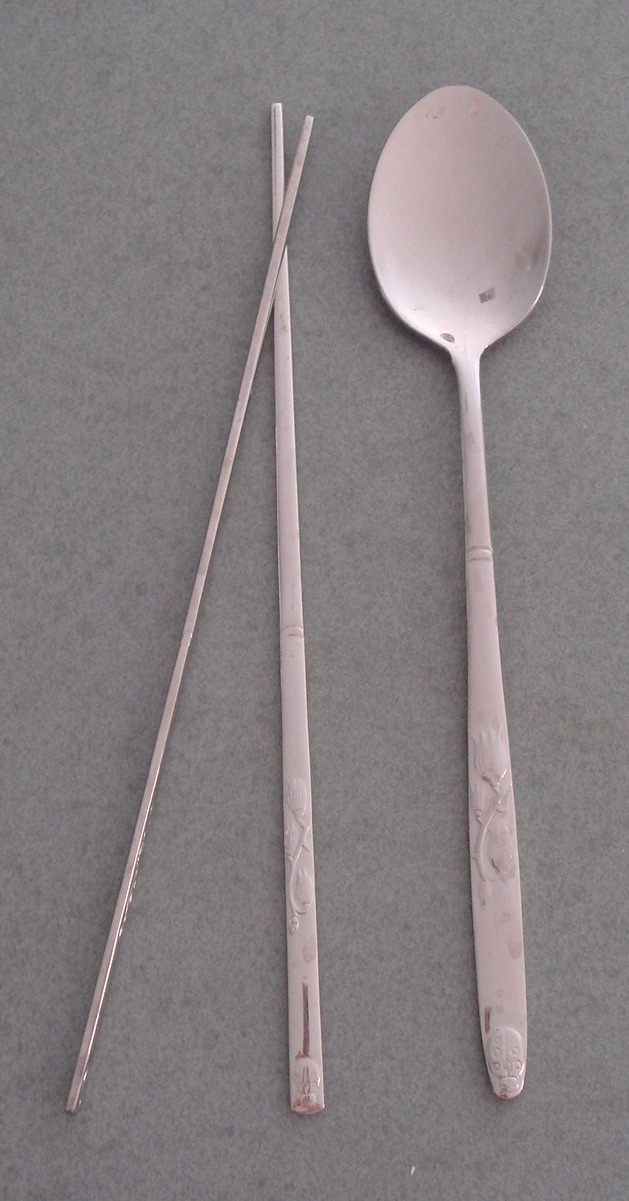
Korean chopsticks and spoon made of stainless steel.

Dining etiquette in Korea can be traced back to the Confucian philosophies of the Joseon period. Guidebooks, such as Sasojeol (士小節, Elementary Etiquette for Scholar Families), written in 1775 by Yi Deokmu (이덕무; 李德懋), comment on the dining etiquette for the period. Suggestions include items such as "when you see a fat cow, goat, pig, or chicken, do not immediately speak of slaughtering, cooking or eating it", "when you are having a meal with others, do not speak of smelly or dirty things, such as boils or diarrhea," "when eating a meal, neither eat so slowly as to appear to be eating against your will nor so fast as if to be taking someone else's food. Do not throw chopsticks on the table. Spoons should not touch plates, making a clashing sound", among many other recommendations which emphasized proper table etiquette.

Other than the etiquette mentioned above, blowing one's nose when having a meal is considered an inappropriate act as well.

The eldest male at the table was always served first, and was commonly served in the men's quarters by the women of the house. Women usually dined in a separate portion of the house after the men were served. The eldest men or women always ate before the younger family members. The meal was usually quiet, as conversation was discouraged during meals. In modern times, these rules have become lax, as families usually dine together now and use the time to converse. Of the remaining elements of this decorum, one is that the younger members of the table should not pick up their chopsticks or start eating before the elders of the table or guests and should not finish eating before the elders or guests finish eating.

In Korea, unlike in other East Asian cuisines such as Chinese and Japanese, the rice or soup bowl is not lifted from the table when eating from it. This is due to the fact that each diner is given a metal spoon along with the chopsticks known collectively as sujeo. The use of the spoon for eating rice and soups is expected. There are rules which reflect the decorum of sharing communal side dishes; rules include not picking through the dishes for certain items while leaving others, and the spoon used should be clean, because usually diners put their spoons in the same serving bowl on the table. Diners should also cover their mouths when using a toothpick after the meal.

The table setup is important as well, and individual place settings, moving from the diner's left should be as follows: rice bowl, spoon, then chopsticks. Hot foods are set to the right side of the table, with the cold foods to the left. Soup must remain on the right side of the diner along with stews. Vegetables remain on the left along with the rice, and kimchi is set to the back while sauces remain in the front.

=== Drinking ===
The manner of drinking alcoholic beverages while dining is significant in Korean dining etiquette. Each diner is expected to face away from the eldest male and cover their mouth when drinking alcohol. According to Hyang Eum Ju Rye (향음주례; 鄕飮酒禮), during the Choseon dynasty, it was impolite for a king and his vassal, a father and his son, or a teacher and his student to drink face to face. Also, a guest should not refuse the first drink offered by a host, and in the most formal situations, the diner should twice politely refuse a drink offered by the eldest male or a host. When the host offers for the third time, then finally the guest can accept it. If the guest refuses three times, the drink is not to be offered again.

== Royal court cuisine ==
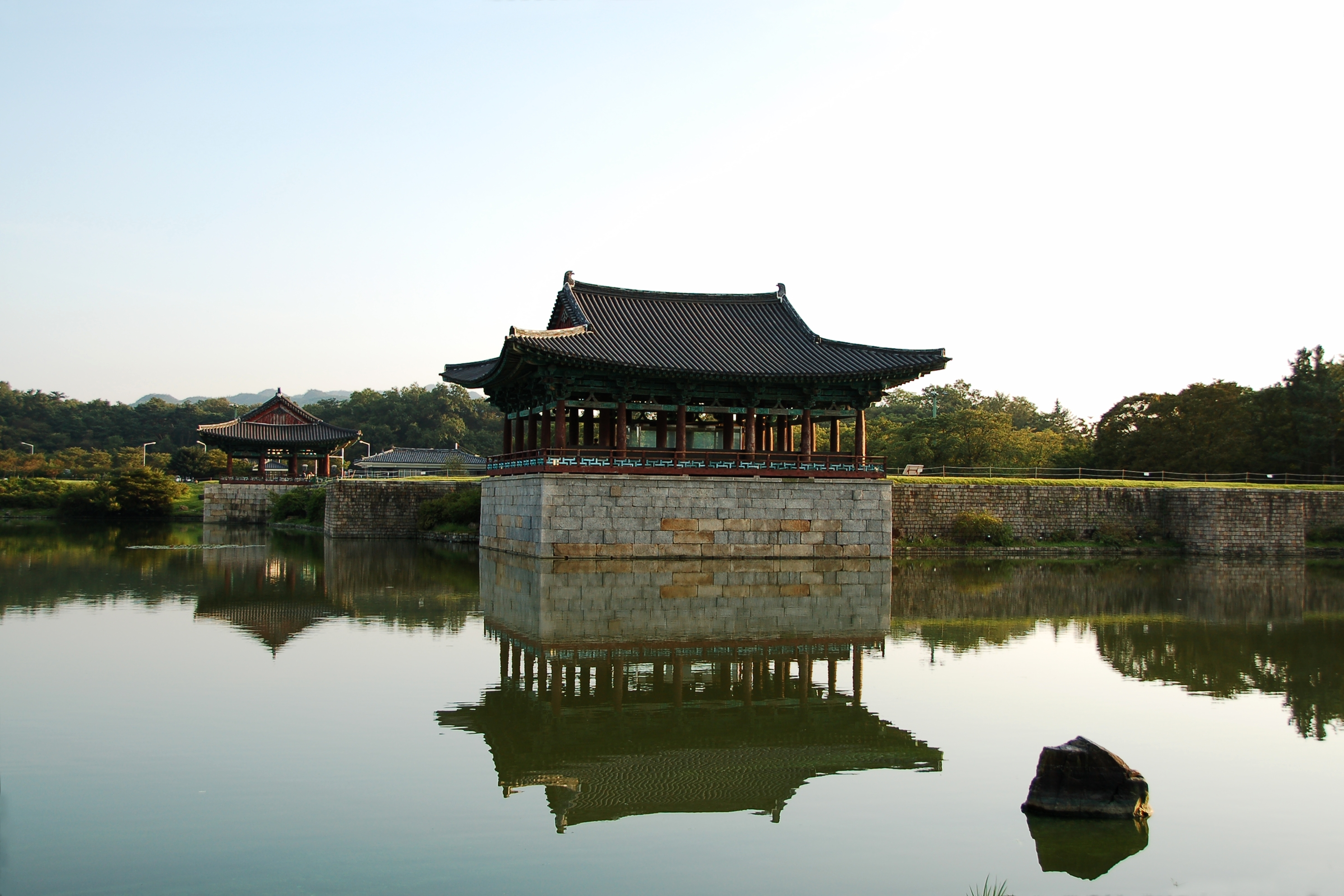
Anapji Lake in Gyeongju, the capital of Silla Kingdom.

Collectively known as gungjung eumsik during the pre-modern era, the foods of the royal palace were reflective of the opulent nature of the past rulers of the Korean peninsula. This nature is evidenced in examples as far back as the Silla kingdom, where a man-made lake (Anapji Lake, located in Gyeongju), was created with multiple pavilions and halls for the sole purpose of opulent banquets, and a spring fed channel, Poseokjeong, was created for the singular purpose of setting wine cups afloat while they wrote poems.

Reflecting the regionalism of the kingdoms and bordering countries of the peninsula, the cuisine borrowed portions from each of these areas to exist as a showcase. The royalty would have the finest regional specialties and delicacies sent to them at the palace. Although there are records of banquets predating the Joseon period, the majority of these records mostly reflect the vast variety of foods, but do not mention the specific foods presented. The meals cooked for the royal family did not reflect the seasons, as the commoner's meals would have. Instead, their meals varied significantly day-to-day. Each of the eight provinces was represented each month in the royal palace by ingredients presented by their governors, which gave the cooks a wide assortment of ingredients to use for royal meals.

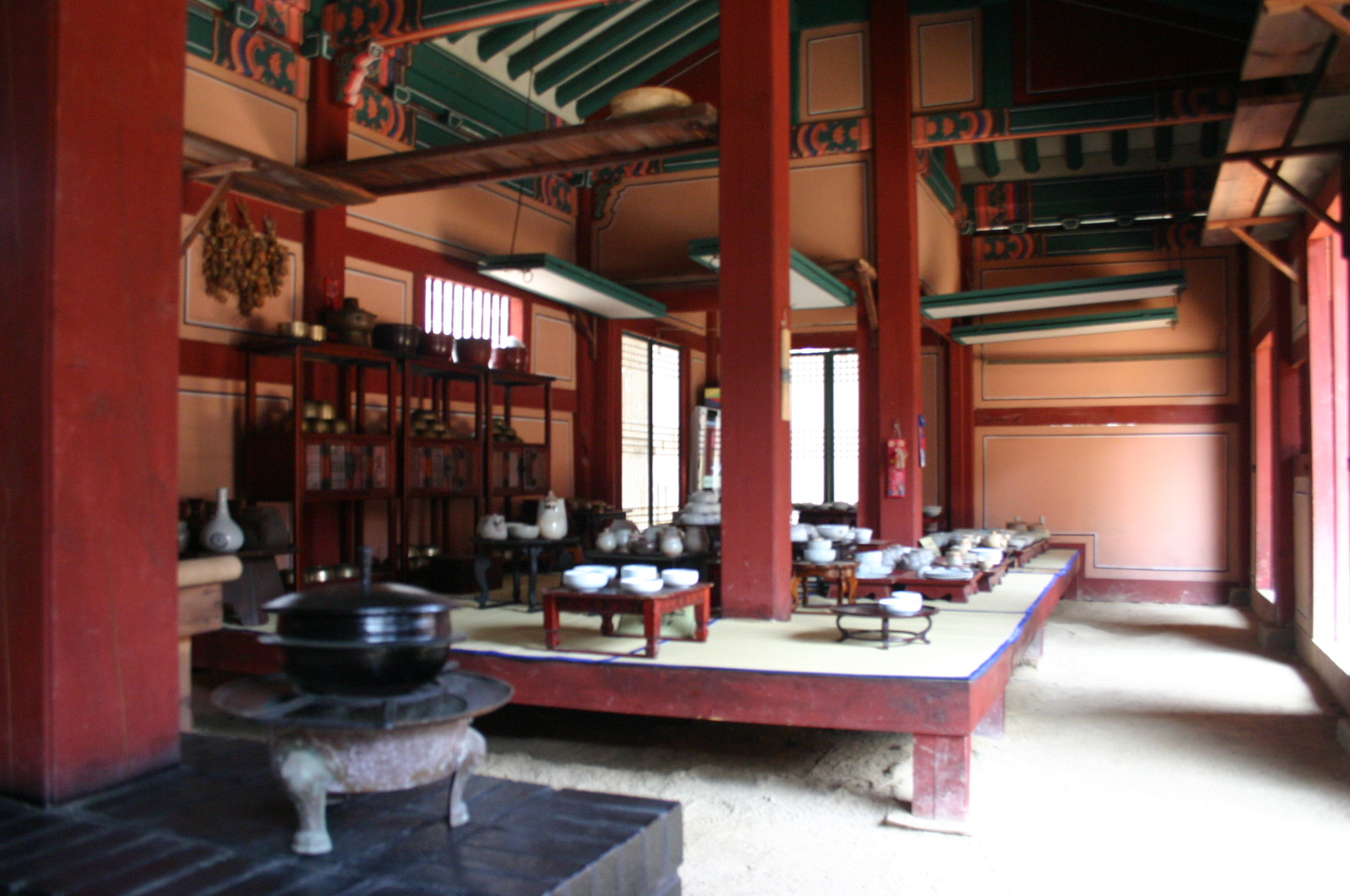
A model of the royal kitchen in the Dae Jang Geum theme park, South Korea.

Food was considered significant in the Joseon period. Official positions were created within the Six Ministries (State Council, 육조) that were charged with all matters related to procurement and consumption of food and drink for the royal court. The Board of Personnel (Ijo, 이조) contained positions specific for attaining rice for the royal family. The Board of Rights (Yejo) were responsible for foods prepared for ancestor rites, attaining wines and other beverages, and medicinal foods. There were also hundreds of slaves and women who worked in the palace that had tasks such as making tofu, liquor, tea, and tteok (rice cakes). The women were the cooks to the royal palace and were of commoner or low-born families. These women would be split into specific skill sets or "bureau" such as the bureau of special foods (Saenggwa-bang, 생과방) or the bureau of cooking foods (Soju-bang, 소주방). These female cooks may have been assisted by male cooks from outside the palace during larger banquets when necessary.

Five meals were generally served in the royal palace each day during the Joseon period, and records suggest this pattern had existed from antiquity. Three of these meals would be full meals, while the afternoon and after dinner meals would be lighter. The first meal, mieumsang (미음상), was served at sunrise and was served only on days when the king and queen were not taking herbal medicines. The meal consisted of rice porridge (juk, 죽) made with ingredients such as abalone (jeonbokjuk), white rice (huinjuk), mushrooms (beoseotjuk), pine nuts (jatjuk), and sesame (kkaejuk). Tarakjuk, a rice and milk based royal porridge was the rare instance of dairy in Korean cuisine. The side dishes could consist of kimchi, nabak kimchi, oysters, soy sauce, and other items. The porridge was thought to give vitality to the king and queen throughout the day.

The sura (수라) were the main meals of the day. Breakfast was served at ten in the morning, and the evening meals were served between six and seven at night. The set of three tables (surasang, 수라상), were usually set with two types of rice, two types of soup, two types of stew (jjigae), one dish of jjim (meat stew), one dish of jeongol (a casserole of meat and vegetables), three types of kimchi, three types of jang (장) and twelve side dishes, called 12 cheop (12첩). The meals were set in the suragan (수라간), a room specifically used for taking meals, with the king seated to the east and the queen to the west. Each had their own set of tables and were attended by three palace servant women known as sura sanggung (수라상궁). These women would remove bowl covers and offer the foods to the king and queen after ensuring the dishes were not poisoned.

Banquets (궁중 연회 음식) were held on special occasions in the Korean Royal Palace. These included birthdays of the royal family members, marriages, and national festivals, including Daeborum, Dano, Chuseok, and Dongji. Banquet food was served on individual tables which varied according to the rank of the person. Usually banquet food consisted of ten different types of dishes. Main dishes were prepared based on the seasonal foods. Main dishes of the banquet included sinseollo, jeon, hwayang jeok, honghapcho, nengmyun and mulgimchi. A typical banquet ingredient was chogyetang (chicken broth with vinegar), which was prepared with five different chickens, five abalones, ten sea cucumbers, twenty eggs, half a bellflower root, mushrooms, two cups of black pepper, two peeled pine nuts, starch, soy sauce and vinegar. Yaksik was a favorite banquet dessert.

== Health effects ==
Traditional Korean diet or Hansik is often associated with spiritual and physical health. While the diet of modern Korean people has become increasingly westernized and consists of numerous non-traditional foods, many believe in the healing power of Hansik. Vegetables and fermented foods are part of a healthy diet around the world, and Hansik includes many vegetable dishes and fermented foods. Vegetables are widely recognized as essential components of a healthy diet. The World Health Organization emphasizes that adequate consumption of fruits and vegetables reduces the risk of noncommunicable diseases. Three dishes, soup, Kimchi and multigrain rice make up the basic meal pattern of Hansik called three Cheopbansang. Fermented soybean paste Doenjang used in soups and fermented red chili paste Gochujang used in kimchi add health benefits to these foods.

Certain foods are typically consumed to combat the heat of the summer or the cold months, regain strength during and after an illness, or for general health. Cool noodle Naengmyeon originally from the northern part of the Korean peninsula is now enjoyed in South Korea as well as many parts of the world especially during the hot summer months. Likewise, ginseng chicken soup Samgyetang is often eaten during summer to reduce heat exhaustion and regain stamina.

Following a traditional Korean diet may lower the risk of some health issues including obesity and metabolic syndrome with a decrease in body mass index (BMI), body fat percent, and low-density lipoprotein (LDL) cholesterol. Fermented foods like kimchi and doenjang contain probiotics which may boost immunity and reduce the incidence or severity of allergic conditions such as asthma and atopic dermatitis. It may also lower the risk of cardiovascular and chronic metabolic diseases such as hypertension and diabetes.

Probiotics typically found in kimchi include species of genera Lactobacillus, Leuconostoc, and Weissella, and they have been linked to anti-inflammatory effects and health benefits such as improved gut health. Napa cabbage is prepared with much salt and approximately 20% of sodium intake comes from kimchi. An increased risk of gastric cancer among subjects with frequent or high consumption of kimchi was found in some case-control studies. As with other salted foods, moderate consumption may maximize health benefits of kimchi.

== See also ==
- Tourism in South Korea
- Culture of South Korea
- Delivery culture in South Korea
- Korean New Year
- Banchan
- Hanjeongsik
- North Korean cuisine
- South Korean cuisine
  - List of Korean desserts
  - List of Korean dishes
  - List of Korean drinks
  - List of Korean restaurants
  - List of oldest restaurants in South Korea
