= List of Korean desserts =

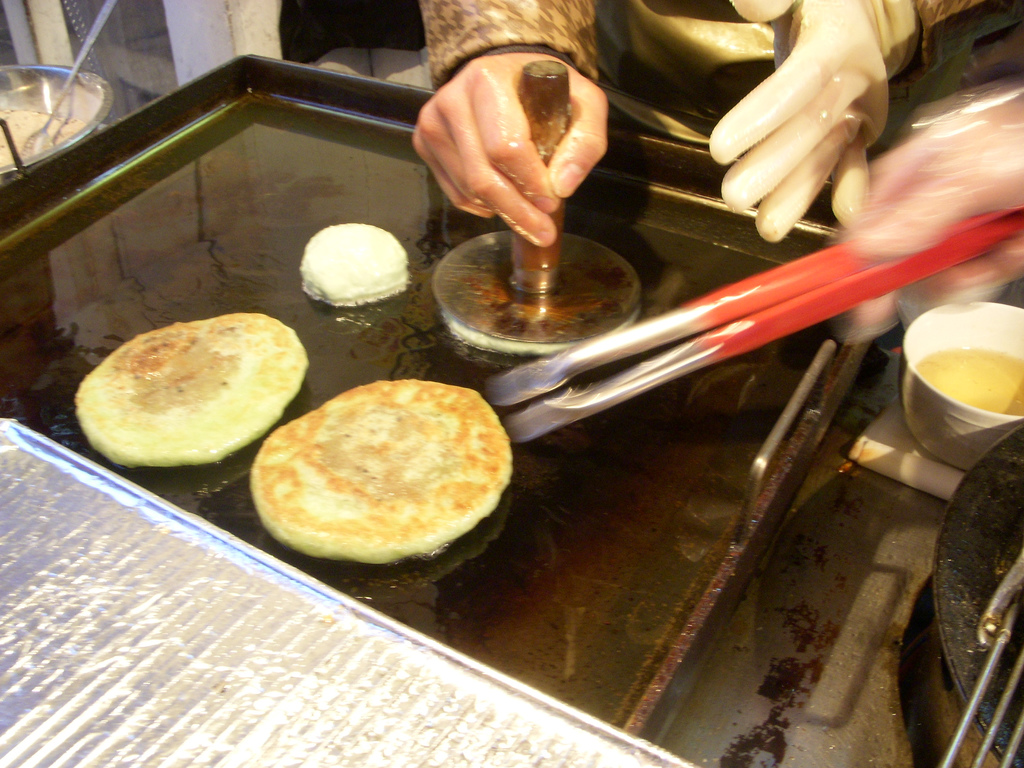
Hotteok is a variety of filled Korean pancake, and is a popular street food of South Korea.

This is a list of Korean desserts. Korean cuisine known today has evolved through centuries of social and political change. Originating from ancient agricultural and nomadic traditions in southern Manchuria and the Korean Peninsula, Korean cuisine has evolved through a complex interaction of the natural environment and different cultural trends.

== Korean desserts ==
Name	Image	Description
Bungeo-ppang		A fish-shaped pastry stuffed with sweetened red bean paste, which originated from the Japanese taiyaki.
Chapssal-tteok		A tteok, or Korean rice cake, made of glutinous rice.
Hwangnam-ppang		A small pastry with a filling of red bean paste.
Hodu-gwaja		A walnut-shaped baked confection with red bean paste filling, whose outer dough is made of skinned and pounded walnuts and wheat flour.
Hoppang		A convenience food version of jjinppang (steamed bread) and is typically filled with smooth, sweetened red bean paste.
Hotteok		A variety of filled Korean pancake, and is a popular street food of South Korea.
Kkul-tarae		Composed of fine strands of honey and maltose, often with a sweet nut filling.
Melona		An ice pop. There are various flavours such as honeydew melon, banana, mango, strawberry, coconut and purple yam.
Patbingsu		A shaved ice dessert with sweet toppings that may include chopped fruit, condensed milk, fruit syrup, and red beans. Varieties with ingredients other than red beans are called bingsu.

== Hangwa ==
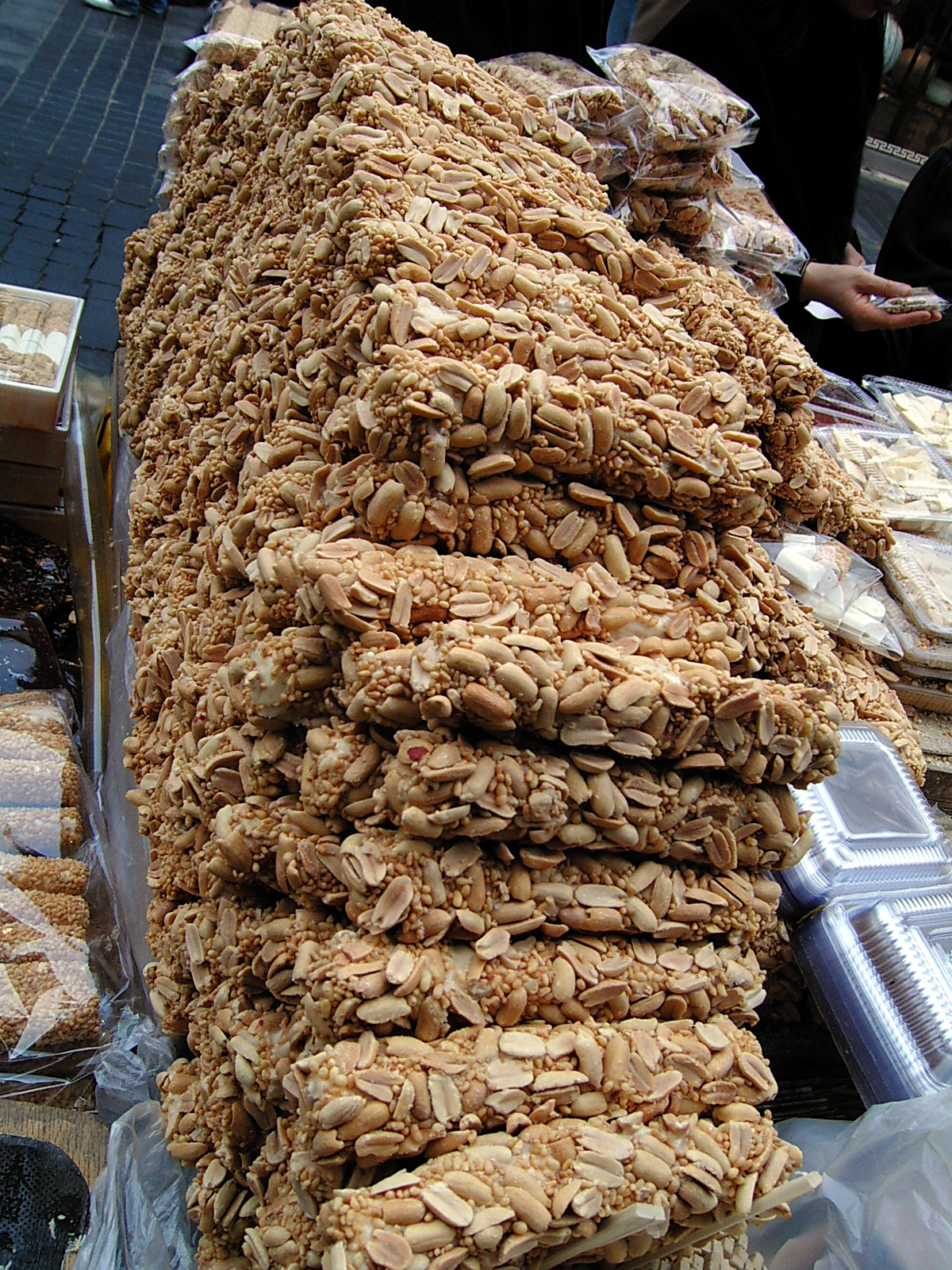
Yeot covered with nuts (ttangkong yeot). Yeot is made from steamed rice, glutinous rice, glutinous sorghum, corn, sweet potatoes, or mixed grains. The steamed ingredients are lightly fermented and boiled in a large pot called a sot.

Hangwa is a general term for Korean traditional confectionery. Common ingredients in hangwa are grain flour, honey, yeot, sugar, fruit or edible root.

- Dasik
- Gangjeong
- Gwapyeon
- Jeonggwa
- Maejakgwa
- Mandugwa
- Okchun-dang
- Suksilgwa
- Yakgwa
- Yeot
- Yeot-gangjeong
- Yumilgwa
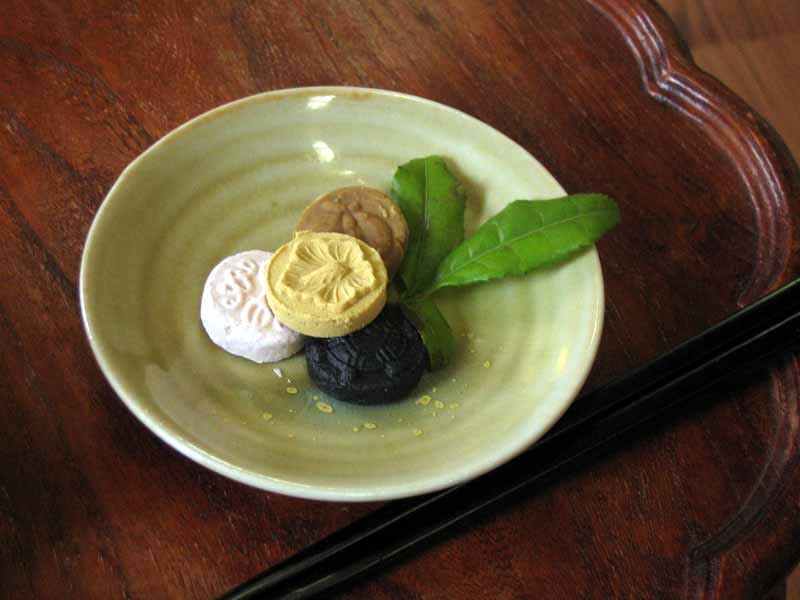
Dasik, a variety of hangwa, is made from nongmal (which is starch made from potatoes, sweet potatoes or soaked mung beans), pine pollen singamchae, black sesame, honey, flour from rice or other grains, nuts and/or herbs.

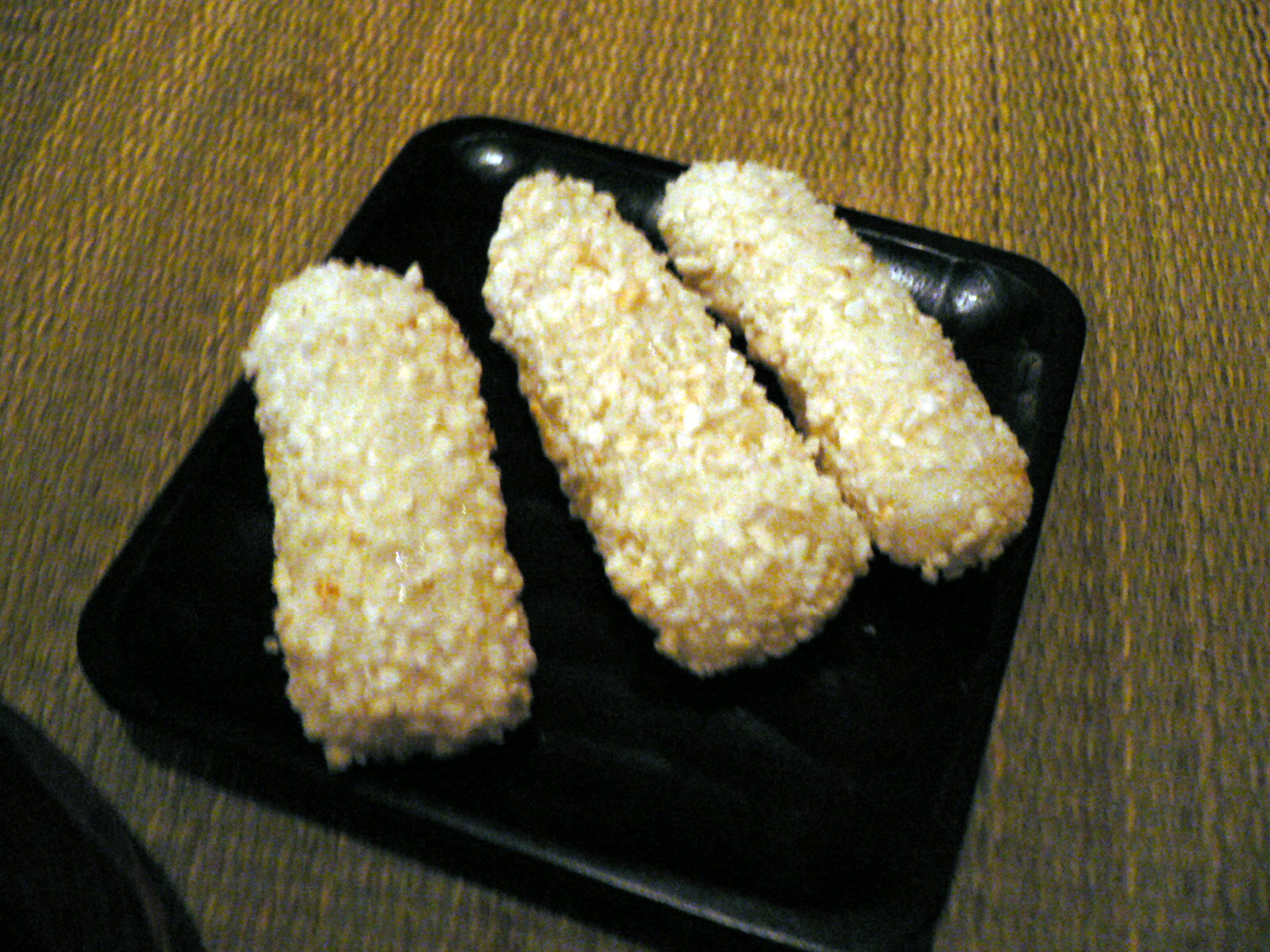
Yumilgwa made by deep frying a mixture of grain flour and honey.

== Tteok ==
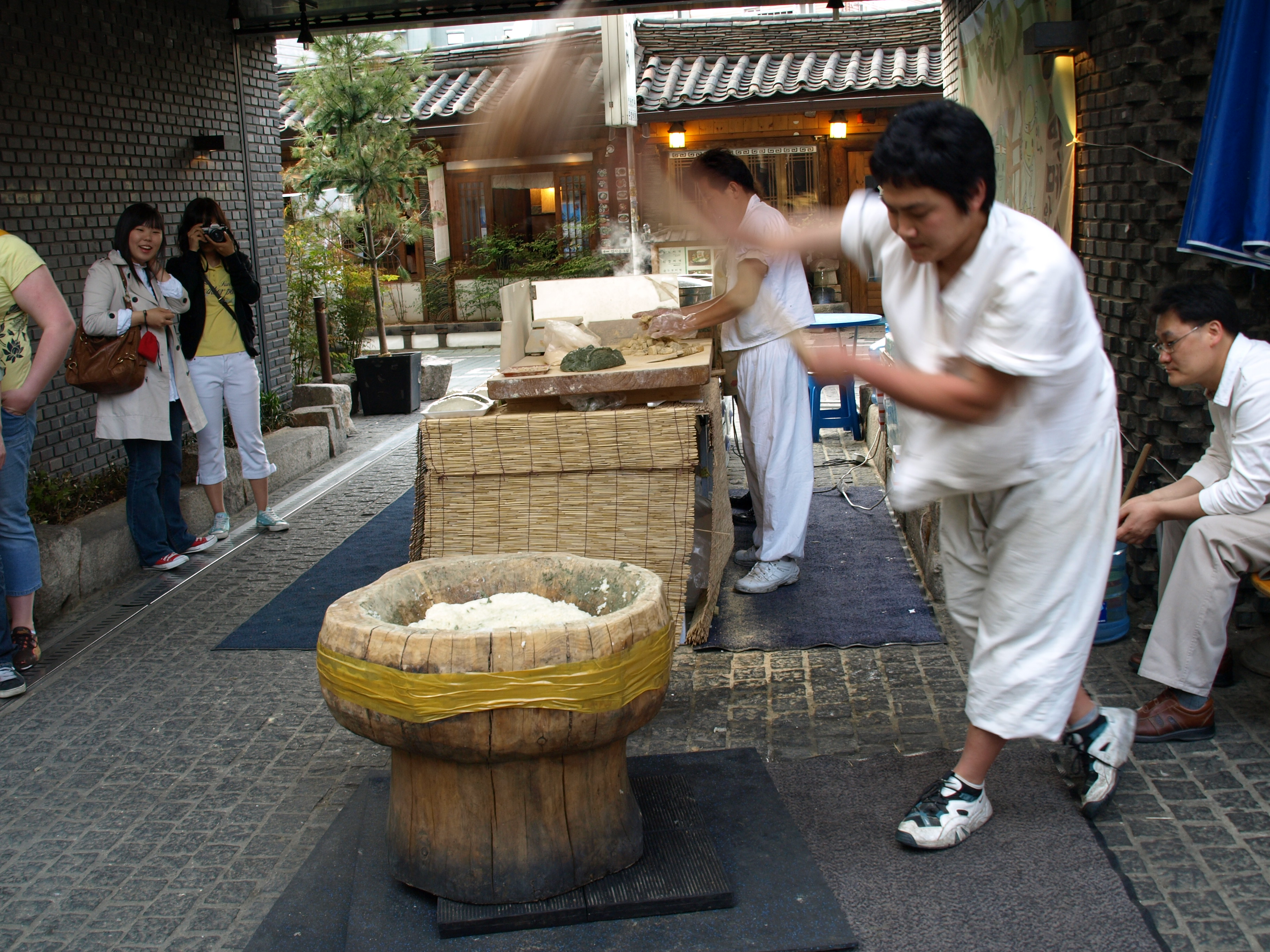
Tteok being pounded; hundreds of different kinds of tteok are eaten year round

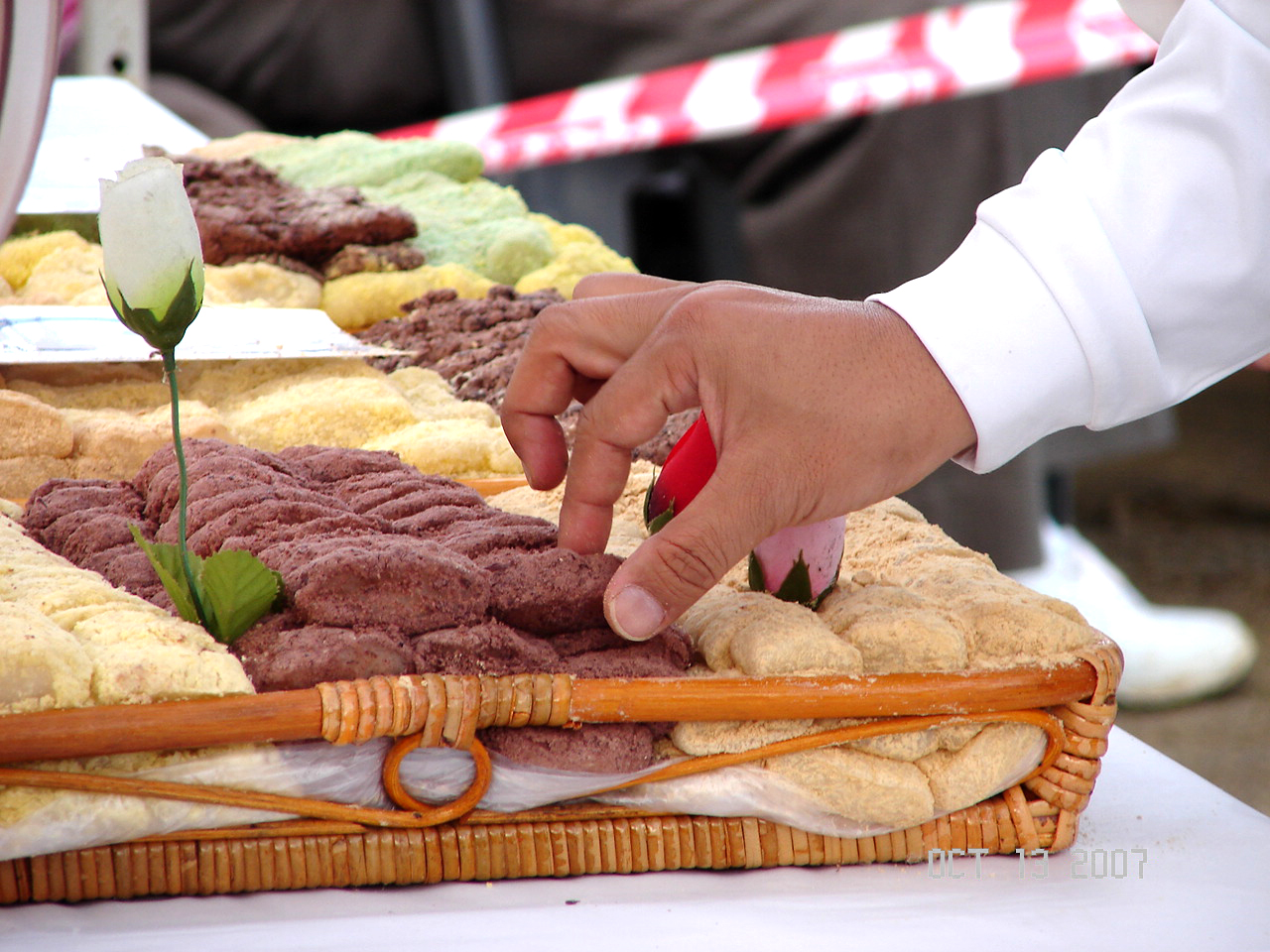
Injeolmi is a variety of tteok, or Korean rice cake, made by steaming and pounding glutinous rice flour.

Tteok is a class of Korean rice cakes made with glutinous rice flour (also known as sweet rice or chapssal), by steaming.

- Baek-seolgi
- Chapssal-tteok
- Gaepi-tteok
- Bupyeon
- Danja
- Hwajeon
- Injeolmi
- Jeolpyeon
- Jeungpyeon
- Mujigae tteok
- Sirutteok
- Songpyeon
- Tteokbokki
- Tteokguk
- Yaksik
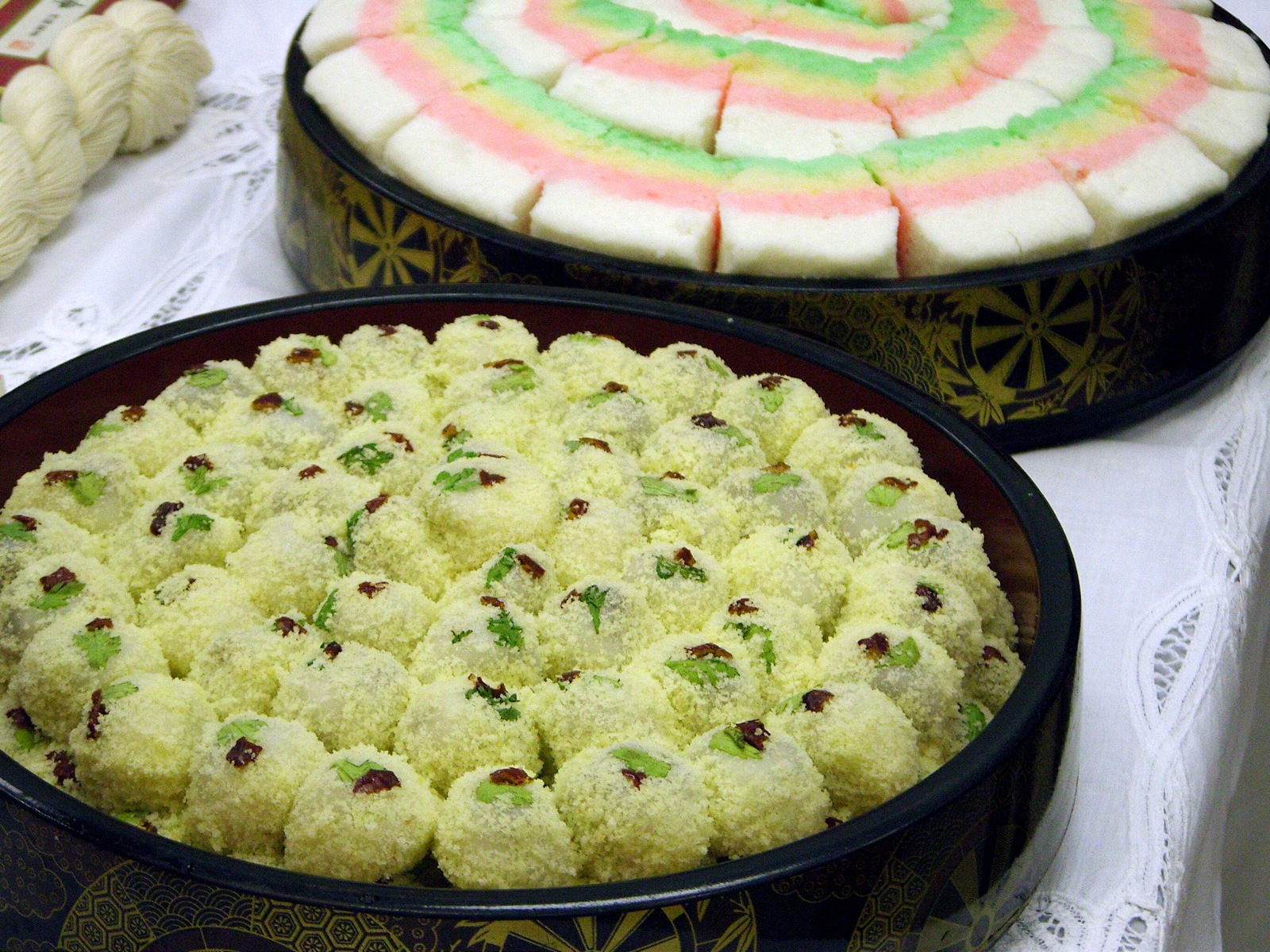
Bupyeon, with mujigae tteok at top. Bupyeon are doughs of glutinous rice flour and a sweet filling and covered with gomul (powdered beans).

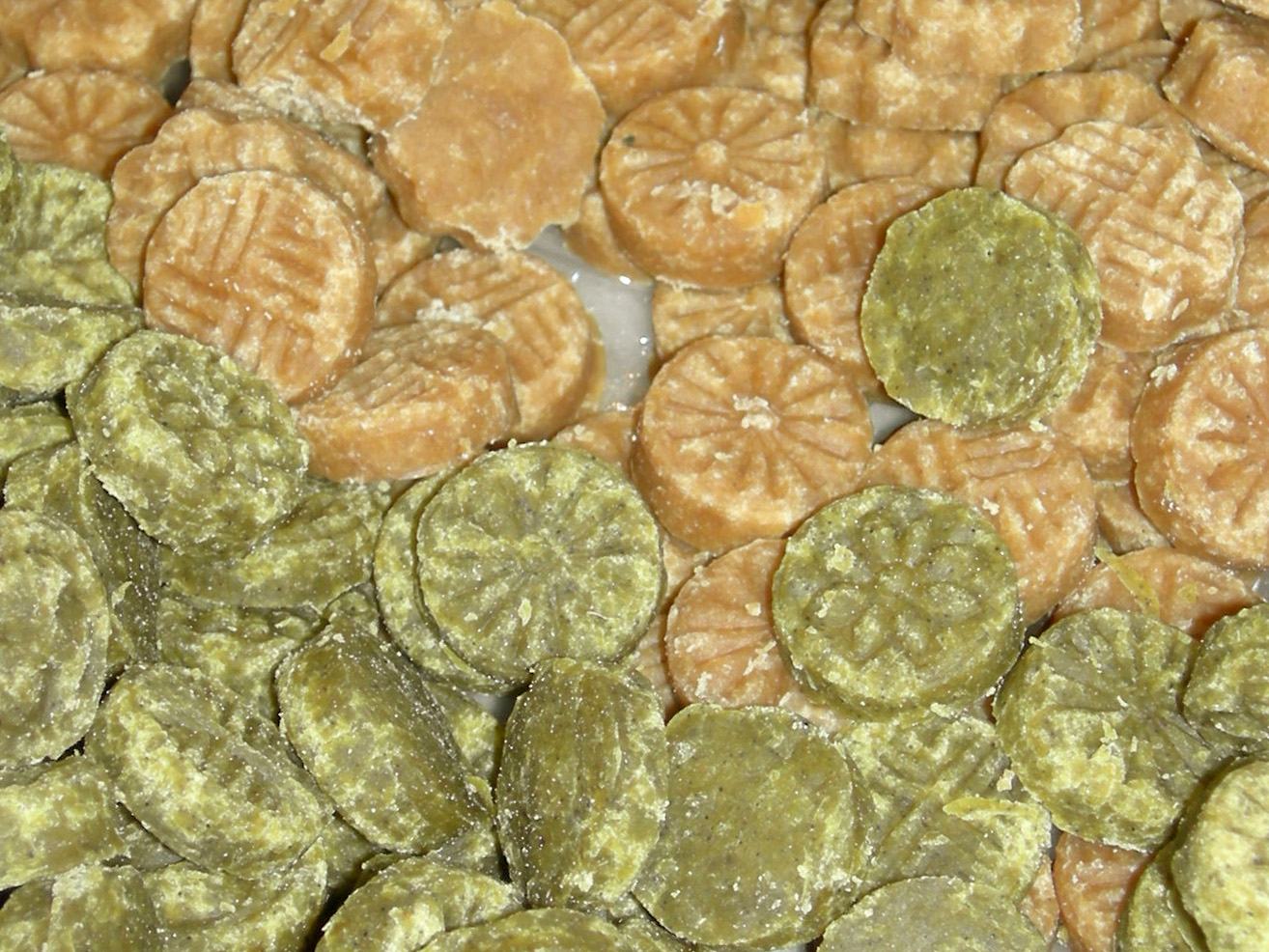
Jeolpyeon is prepared with rice powder dough which is steamed and patterned.

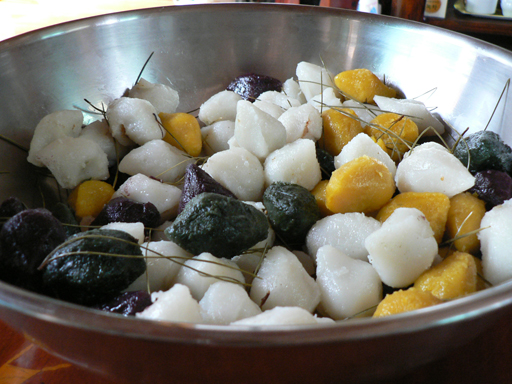
Songpyeon are small rice cakes traditionally eaten during the Korean autumn harvest festival, Chuseok.

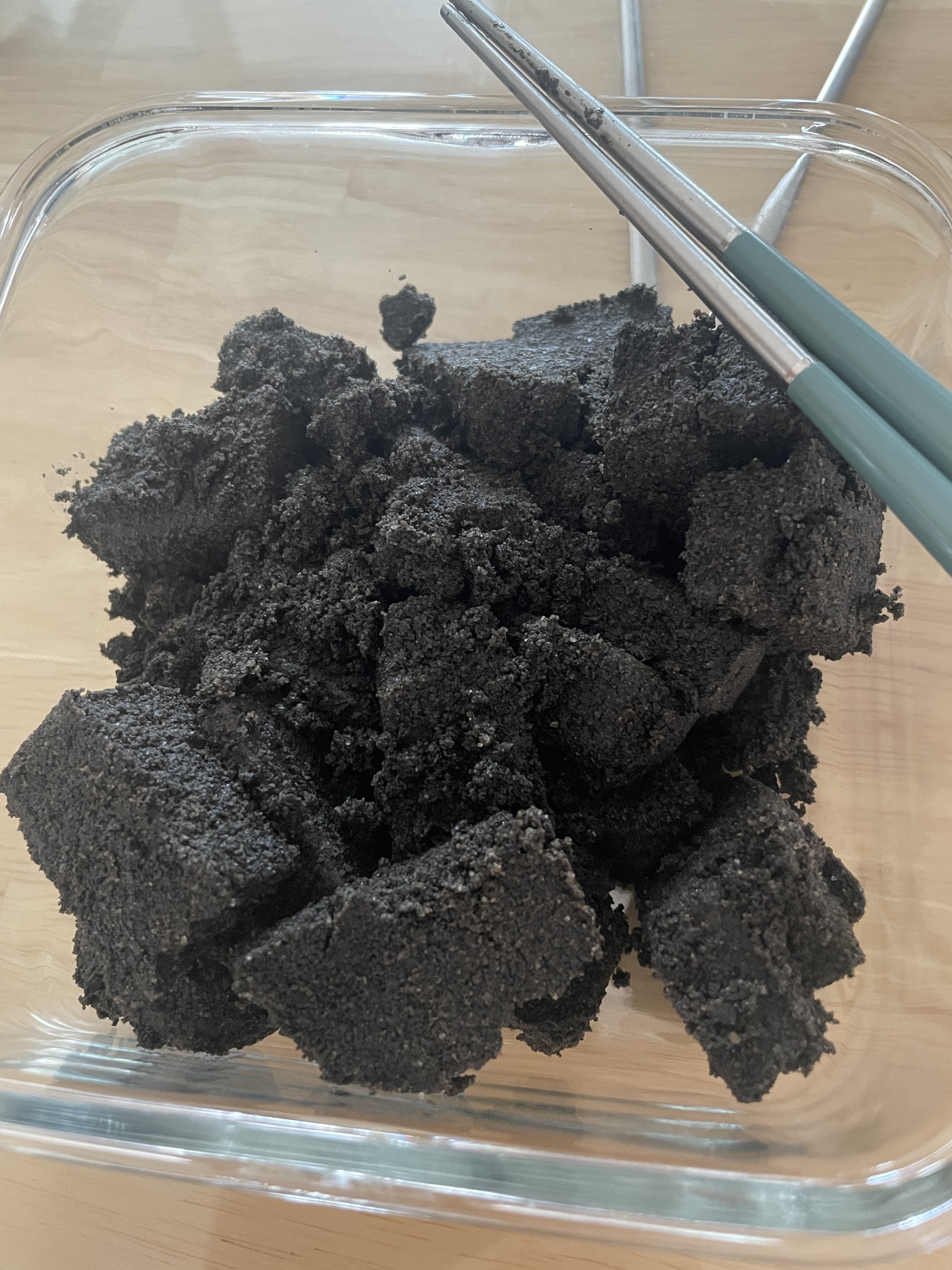
Black sesame rice sold with black sesame powder on Injeolmi

== See also ==
=== Korean desserts ===
- Korean cuisine – sweets
- List of Korean dishes – sweets and snacks

=== Related topics ===
- Cuisine
- Korean baked goods
- Korean snacks (category)
- List of desserts
- List of Korean beverages
- List of North Korean dishes
