= Banana milk (disambiguation) =

Banana milk may refer to:

- Banana milk, banana-flavored dairy or non-dairy beverage
- Banana Flavored Milk, a brand of South Korean banana milk
- Plant milk made from bananas

== See also ==
- Mooala
