= Tjolk =

Dutch milk drink

- Type: Flavored milk
- Origin: Netherlands
- Introduced: 1977
- Discontinued: 1992, 2010 and 2015
- Flavor: Chocolate, strawberry and banana

Tjolk was a Dutch milk drink that was created by Coberco and sold from 1977 to 1984 and was revived in 2010 and 2013.

== Information ==
The drink was first sold in the Netherlands in 1977. It was marketed with the slogan, "Tjolk is lekker, overal en altijd!" (Tjolk is tasty, everywhere and always!). The packaging for the drink featured colorful cartoon drawings of animals including cows, bunnies, monkeys and bears and the brand had many commercials aimed at children. The original drink was a sweet drink with various additives. The brand was discontinued in 1992 when Coberco merged with Friesland Foods with concerns of the brand needing updated and being unable to compete with the more successful brand, Chocomél.

The brand was purchased by Sjoerd Stouten in 2010 from Friesland Foods as he felt the brand still had name value, but the revival was unsuccessful. Tjolk was removed from stores after it became known that it could spoil prematurely. Customers were warned not to drink the products and to throw them away. An entrepreneur named Niek Nielen from the Galatrada company bought the rights to the brand in 2013. Changes were made to the drink, as it only used natural ingredients and had less sugar with real fruits being used instead. The brand hit the shelves in 2014 with three flavors - chocolate, banana and strawberry. The brand was supposed to build on nostalgia. Nielen had also planned to expand the brand to Belgium, Germany and France. The brand won an award for best product of the year in 2014–15. The brand managed to get into 1500 stores, however, the success was short lived. The brand was discontinued and sold again in 2015.

== In popular culture ==
Tjolk featured advertisements in Donald Duck comic books during its initial run

Tjolk sponsored a speed skating team in 2015 that was known as "Team Tjolk". One of its athletes, Evert Hoolwerf, won the KPN Cup in 2015.
