= Flavored milk =

Sweetened dairy drink

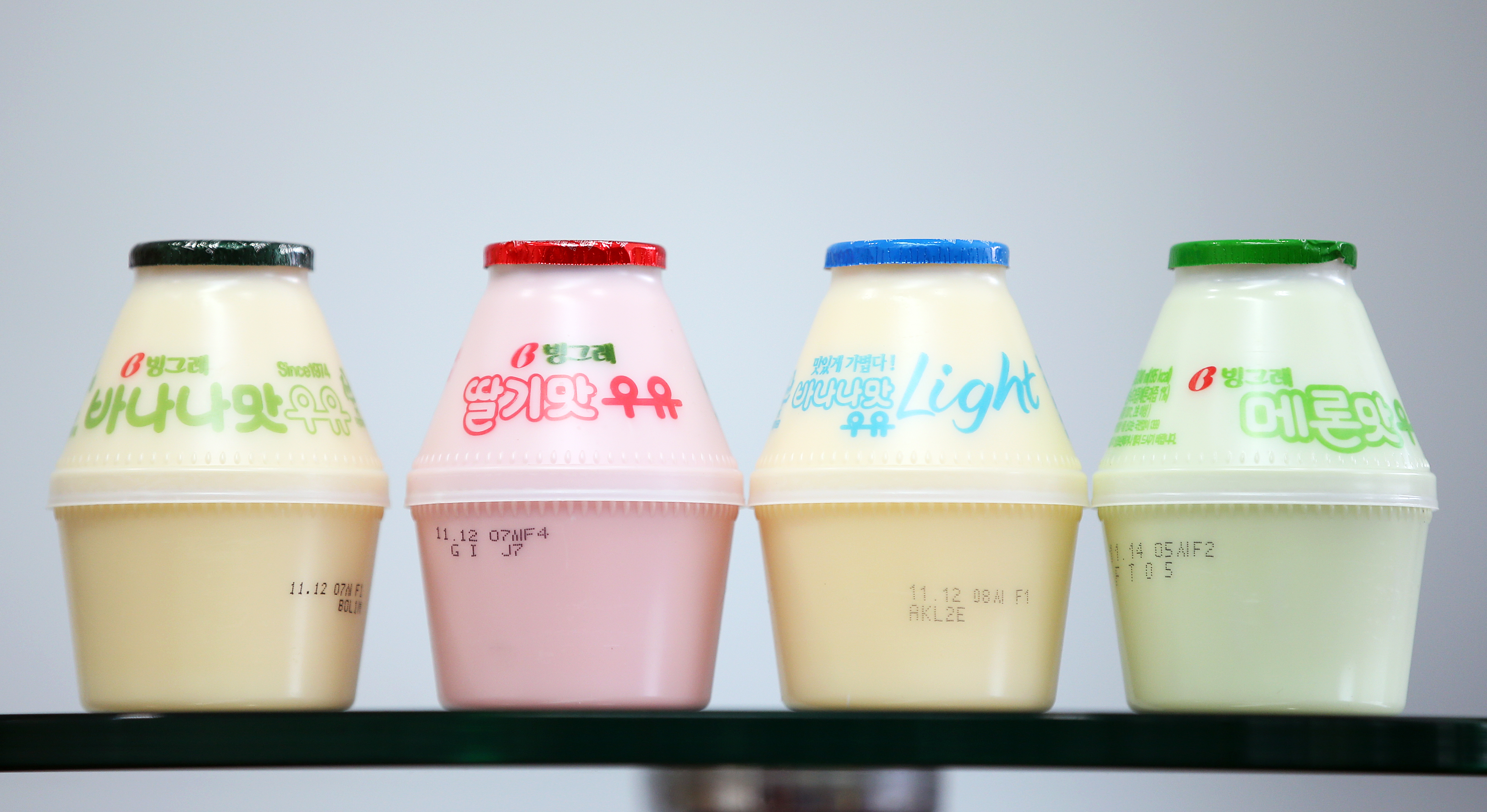
Binggrae milk products in flavors such as banana, strawberry and melon

Flavored milk is a sweetened dairy drink made with milk, sugar, flavorings, and sometimes food colorings. It may be sold as a pasteurized, refrigerated product, or as an ultra-high-temperature (UHT) treated product not requiring refrigeration. It may also be made in restaurants or homes by mixing flavorings into milk.

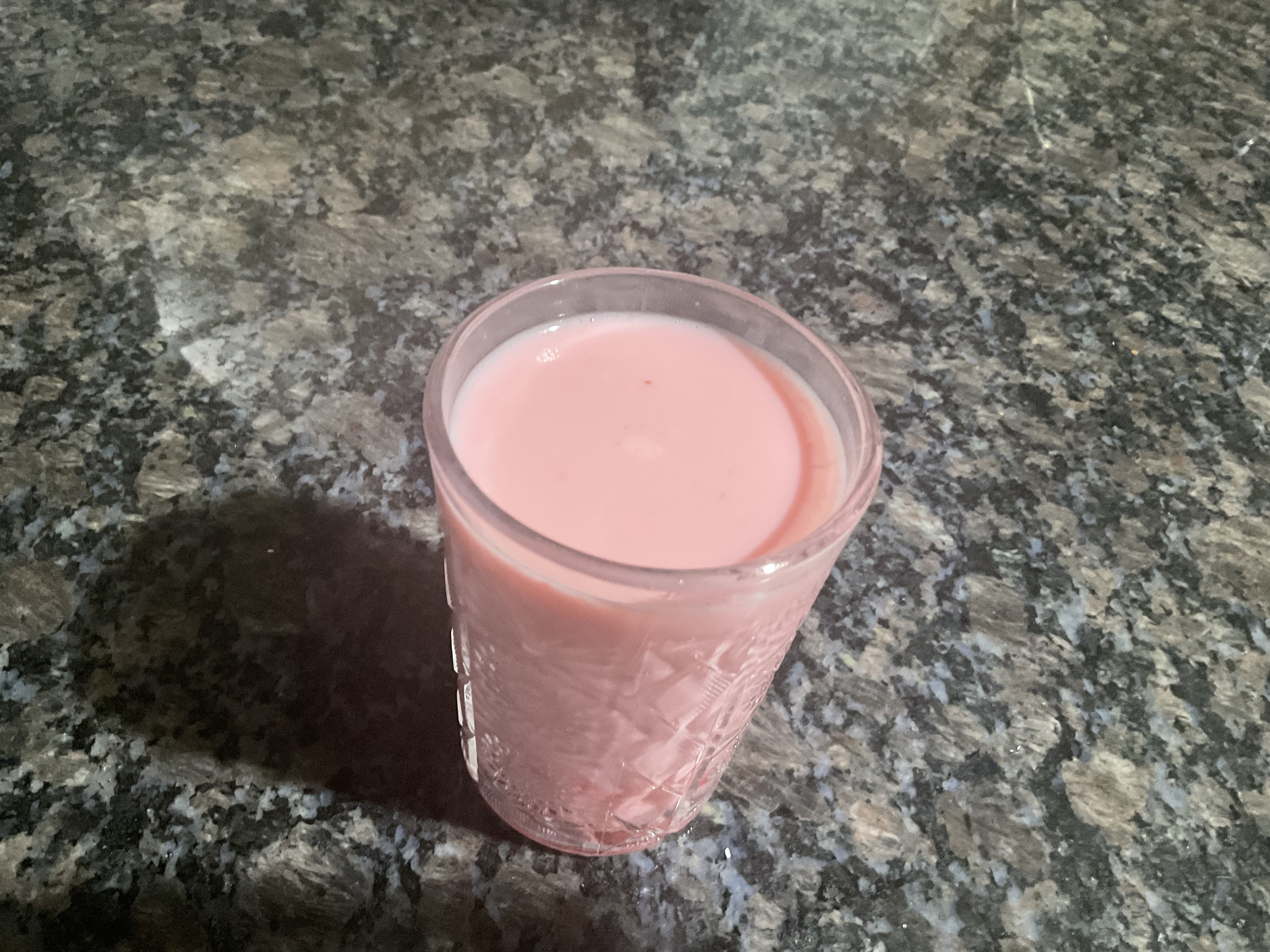
A glass cup of strawberry-flavored milk

In New England, milk blended with flavored syrups such as chocolate or strawberry in a milkshake machine, is commonly called a "milkshake"; in other parts of the United States, a milkshake always includes ice cream or thickeners.

== Types ==
Common flavorings include chocolate, coffee, malted milk, vanilla, strawberry and banana. Commercial brand flavors include Horlicks, Nesquik and Milo. Bottled spiced (masala) milk is a popular beverage in the Indian subcontinent.

== Consumption ==
Australia has the highest consumption of flavored milk in the world, drinking 9.5 L (2.5 US gal) more than the per capita figure for any other country in 2003. It is particularly popular in the Australian states of South Australia and Western Australia. In the latter state, green-colored, spearmint-flavored milk is a local treat. A 2013 Sunday Times article reported Western Australia was the "flavoured milk capital of Australia," with a A$220-million industry, average consumption of 19 liters (5.0 U.S. gal) per person, and more than 40 varieties of iced coffee alone available. Similarly, a 2006 Adelaide Advertiser reported South Australia consumed 45,000,000 L (12,000,000 US gal) of flavored milk each year, with 82% of market share held by a single brand, Farmers Union. According to Coca-Cola Amatil, one of the largest bottlers in the Asia-Pacific region, South Australia is the only place where sales of flavored milk outstrip those of cola.

== Controversy and criticism ==
Jamie Oliver, host of Jamie Oliver's Food Revolution, brought attention in the United States to public schools that serve flavored milk in the school cafeterias. Flavored milk advocates claim that many children will avoid the nutrition found in milk unless it has been flavored, with the benefits of milk outweighing a few teaspoons of sugar. Opponents say that with rising levels of obesity and heart disease, flavored milk should be removed from schools and children should be taught to drink plain milk.

A 2018 analysis of more than 90 popular chilled flavored dairy milks revealed that a carton of flavored milk can contain as much sugar as a can of soft drink, with many of the bestselling brands containing more than a day's worth of added sugar in a single serving.

Recently, there have been limited new regulations introduced to safeguard children's meals. The latest policy, known as the fourth state-level Healthy Beverage Default law (HBD), aims to restrict sugary beverage options in children's meals. However, it has been found ineffective in reducing children's sugar intake. Despite efforts in various U.S. states like Illinois and Delaware to regulate flavored milk and 100% juice, there are still variations in fat content, size restrictions, and calorie limitations for children.

== See also ==
- Chocolate milk
- Coffee milk
- Horlicks
- Malted milk
- Milkshake
- Nesquik
- Milo (drink)
- Papaya milk
