= Okchun-dang =

Korean candy

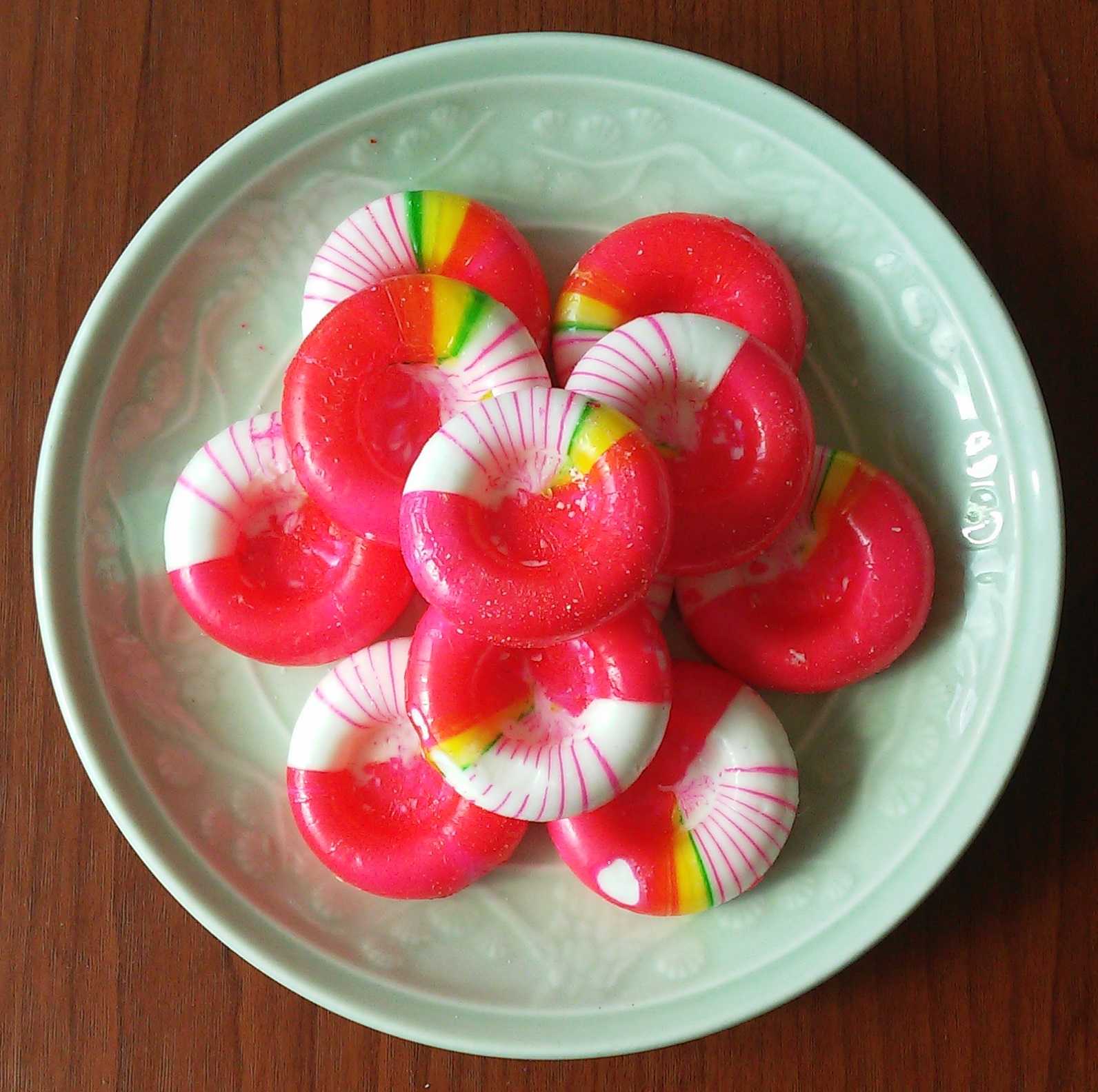
- Alternative names: Okchun, saek-kusŭl-sathang
- Type: Candy
- Place of origin: Korea
- Associated cuisine: Korean cuisine
- Main ingredients: Rice flour

South Korean name
- Hangul: 옥춘당; 옥춘
- Hanja: 玉春糖; 玉春
- RR: okchundang; okchun
- MR: okch'undang; okch'un
- IPA: [ok̚.tɕʰun.daŋ]; [ok̚.tɕʰun]

North Korean name
- Hangul: 색구슬사탕
- Hanja: 色구슬沙糖
- RR: saekguseulsatang
- MR: saekkusŭlsat'ang
- IPA: [sɛk̚.k͈u.sɯl.sa.tʰaŋ]

Okchun-dang (Korean: 옥춘당; Hanja: 玉春糖) or okchun (옥춘; 玉春), called saek-kusŭl-sathang (색구슬사탕; "colour marble candy") in North Korea, is a traditional Korean sweet made of rice flour. The flat, rounded sweet is red with white, yellow and green decoration.

It is a staple on the table for various traditional ceremonies such as jesa (ancestral rite) and hwangap (60th birthday).

== Gallery ==
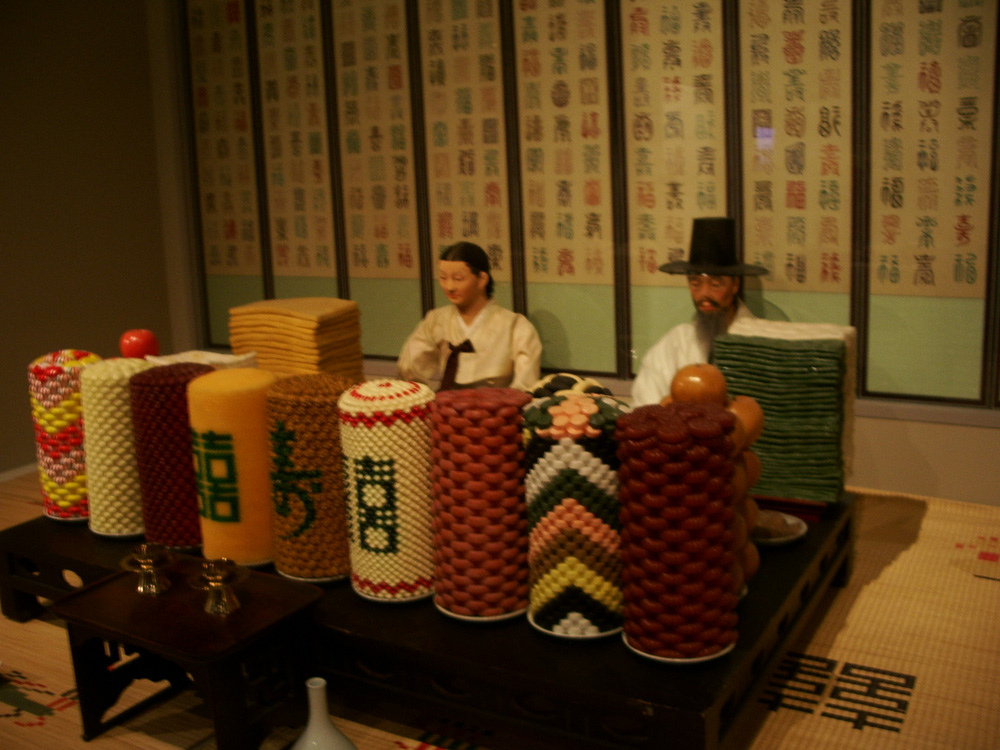
(the left-most stack in the photo) okchun-dang piled high on the table at a celebration of hwangap
