= Watermelon milk =

Taiwanese milk beverage

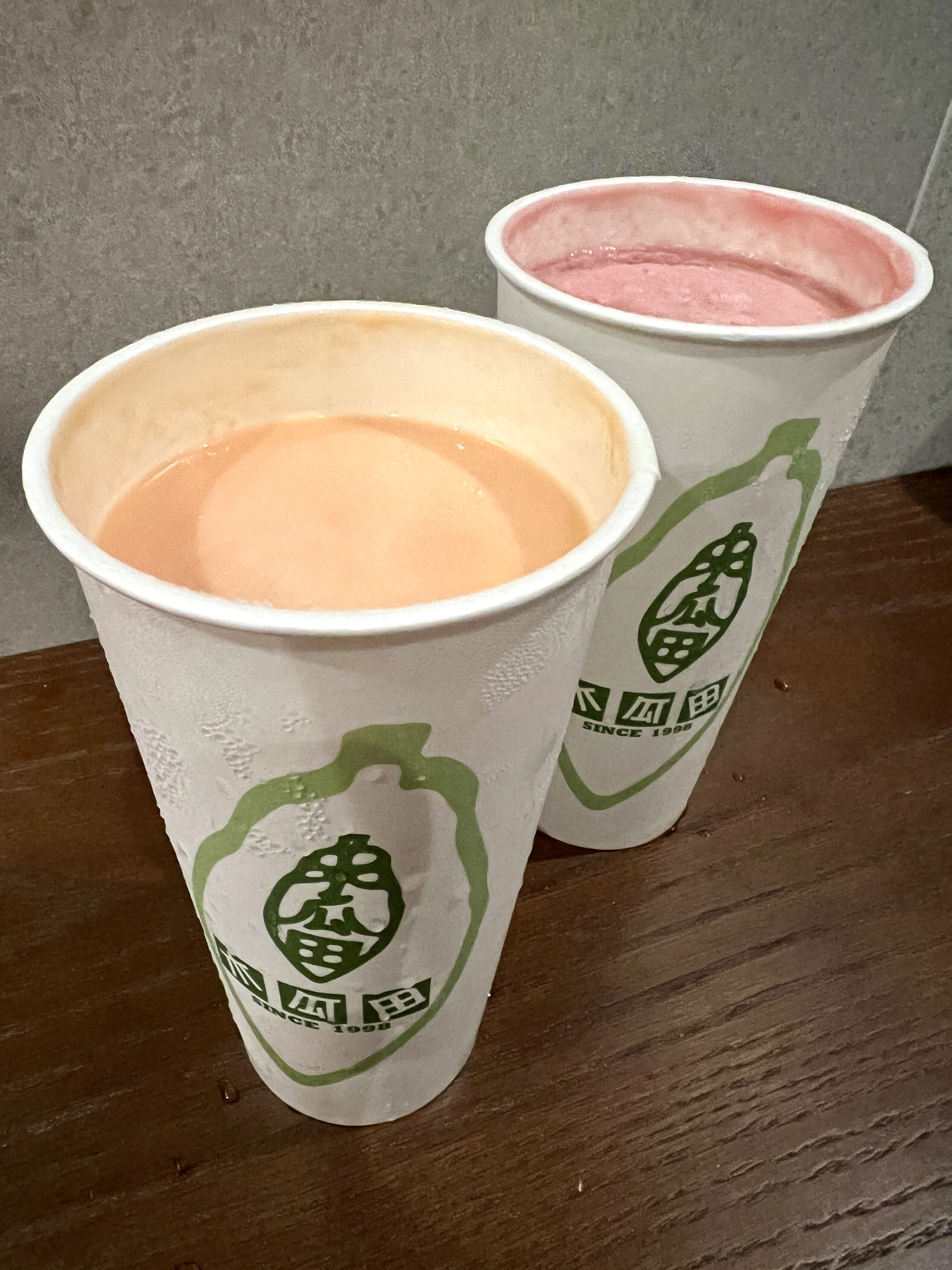
- Type: Milk
- Manufacturer: Uni-President Enterprises Corporation
- Origin: Taiwan
- Introduced: 1991
- Color: Pink

Watermelon milk (Chinese: 西瓜牛乳; pinyin: Xīgūa Níurǔ) is a Taiwanese milk beverage made from fresh watermelon and milk, the most common of which is produced by Uni-President Enterprises Corporation in Taiwan.

== Flavour ==
The beverage consists of more than 50 percent milk and concentrated watermelon juice. Watermelon milk has a creamy and slightly sweet flavour with a light pink colour.

== See also ==
- Banana Flavored Milk
- Papaya milk
