= Melona =

South Korean ice pop brand

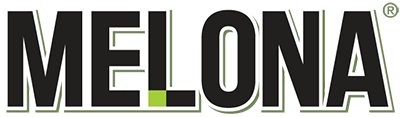

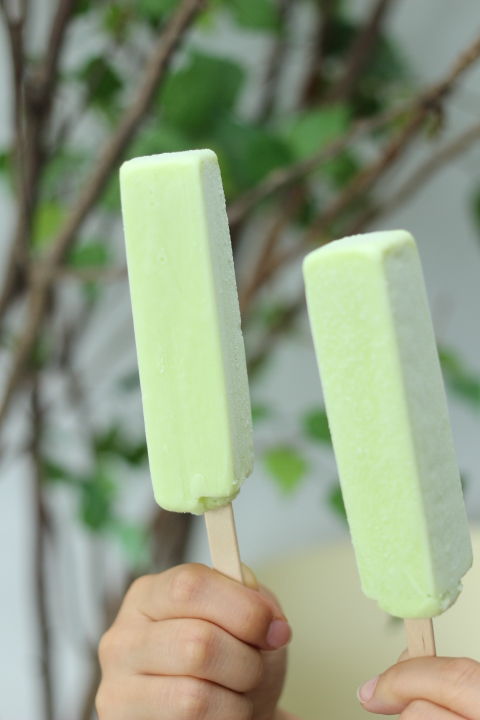
- Melon-flavoured Melona pops
- Product type: Ice milk
- Produced by: Binggrae
- Country: South Korea
- Introduced: 1992; 34 years ago
- 130 kcal/80 ml (2.7 fl oz), as of 2009

Korean name
- Hangul: 메로나
- RR: Merona
- MR: Merona

Melona (Korean: 메로나) is a South Korean ice pop, manufactured by Binggrae Co. Ltd. Although the product is called "Melona" and is identified by its honeydew melon flavour, the ice pop also comes in other fruit flavours, such as banana, strawberry, mango, purple yam (ube), coconut, pistachio, and the hawaii-exclusive piña colada.

== Description ==
=== History ===
Melona was first introduced as a cantaloupe-flavoured ice cream in 1992. During the development of Melona in 1991, Binggrae went to Southeast Asia for market research and became aware of honeydew melons. At the time, melon was such a rare fruit in Korea that Binggrae decided it would be a new and unique flavour and began product development. However, because melons were so unfamiliar to Korean consumers, the 'melon flavour' was bound to feel strange to them.

=== Market ===
In the first year after introduction, it made 21 billion won (approximately 18 million USD) in sales. Melona is generally sold in convenience stores in South Korea. According to data from Family Mart, Melona was its eighth most popular product sold in 2007.

It can also be found in increasing numbers of stores around the world, including in Argentina, Australia, Brazil, Canada, Chile, China, Czech Republic, Germany, Indonesia, Ireland, Malaysia, the Netherlands, New Zealand, Paraguay, Philippines, Singapore, Sweden, United Kingdom, United States, and Vietnam.

Each 80 ml (2.7 fl oz) bar contains 130 kcal of energy as of 2009.

== Flavours ==
- Honeydew melon
- Banana
- Mango
- Strawberry
- Coconut
- Purple yam
- Pistachio
- Piña colada (Hawaii-exclusive)

== See also ==
- List of frozen dessert brands
- List of Korean desserts
