= Yakgwa =

Korean dessert

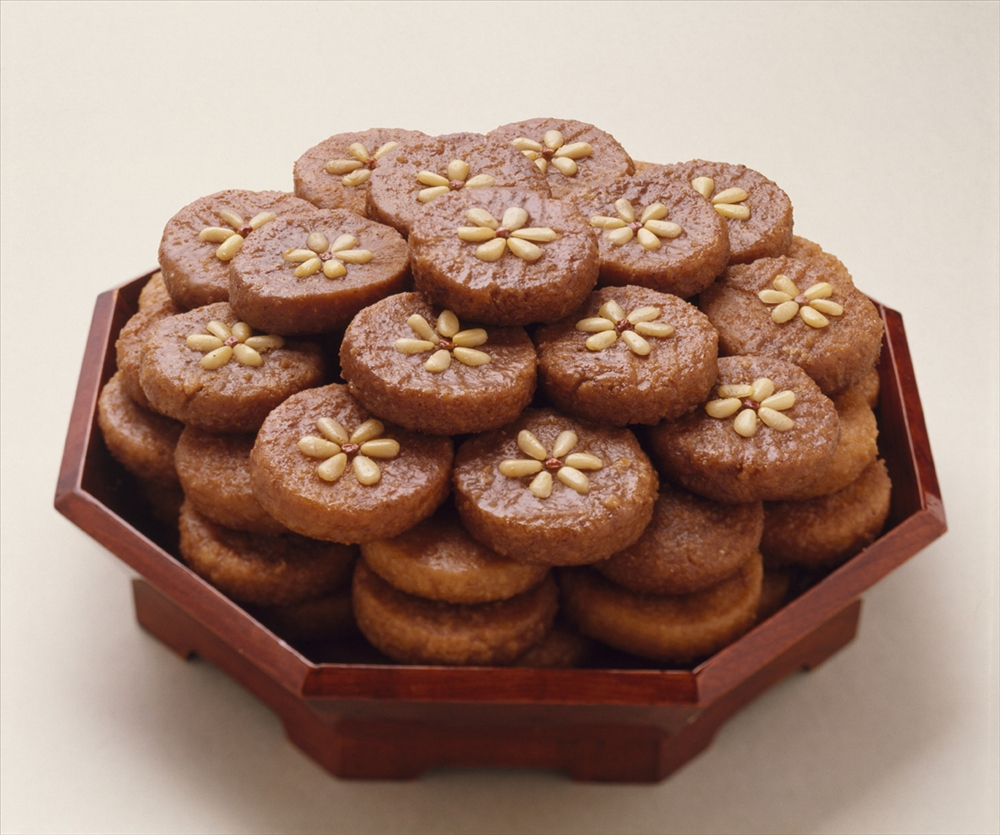
- Alternative names: Gwajul
- Type: Yumil-gwa
- Place of origin: Korea
- Associated cuisine: Korean cuisine
- Main ingredients: Wheat flour, honey, sesame oil
- Food energy (per 1 serving): 67.5 kcal (282 kJ)

Korean name
- Hangul: 약과
- Hanja: 藥菓
- RR: yakgwa
- MR: yakkwa
- IPA: [jak̚.k͈wa]

Yakgwa (Korean: 약과), also called gwajul (과줄), is a type of yumil-gwa, which is deep-fried, wheat-based hangwa (Korean confection) made with honey, cheongju (rice wine), sesame oil, and ginger juice. Traditionally, the sweet was offered in a jesa (ancestral rite) and enjoyed on festive days such as chuseok (harvest festival), marriages, or hwangap (sixtieth-birthday) celebrations. In modern South Korea, it is also served as a dessert and can be bought at traditional markets or supermarkets.

== Etymology ==
Yakgwa (약과; 藥菓), consisting of two syllables, yak (약; 藥; "medicine") and gwa (과; 菓; "confection"), means "medicinal confection". This name comes from the large amount of honey that is used to prepare it, because pre-modern Koreans considered honey to be medicinal and so named many honey-based foods yak ("medicine").

"Honey cookie" is a common English translation for this confection's name. The sweet and sticky cookie is very popular in South Korea, and is enjoyed by locals and tourists alike. The treat is known for its slightly nutty, syrupy flavor that is lightly sweet and chewy due to it being soaked in honey. Most yakgwa are found in confectionery shops all over South Korea.

== History ==
Yakgwa is a food with a long history. It was made for Buddhist rites during the Later Silla era (668–935). It was popular during the Goryeo dynasty and was enjoyed by royal families, aristocrats, temples, and private houses. In the past, yakgwa was typically enjoyed by nobles and the upper-class because honey was considered for medicinal purposes, rather than a cooking ingredient. Therefore, it was usually reserved for those who were able to pay for the expensive medicinal confectionery. Nowadays, the cookie is available for everyone in shops and bakeries, and is enjoyed as an afternoon snack or sweet treat. During the Goryeo era (918–1392), yakgwa was used for pyebaek (a formal greeting) in the wedding ceremony of Goryeo kings and Yuan princesses.

Yakgwa was originally made in the shape of birds and animals, but it became flatter for ease of stacking during the Joseon era (1392–1897). Each pattern signifies a wish; butterflies represent a happy marriage, bats bring fortune, and pine trees symbolize the beginning of a new year. One would print a lotus for harmony and a pomegranate for fertility. During the Joseon Kingdom, it was simplified into a sphere. However, the balls were not suitable for presenting at the table for ancestral rites, and so it transformed into a cube. Eventually, the yakgwa was stylized to take its current shape, round with a rippled edge. The cookie is now well-known for its characteristic flower-like shape with sesame seeds sprinkled on the center.

In pre-modern Korea, yakgwa was mostly enjoyed by the upper classes, as wheat was a rare and cherished ingredient, and honey was also regarded highly. Today yakgwa is commonly served with tea, but can also be gifts for special occasions. Its popularity surges during traditional holidays as well, including Seollal and Chuseok.

In the 2020s, yakgwa has also been used as an ingredient or topping in modern desserts such as cookies, financiers, doughnuts, and ice cream. In 2023, the convenience store chain CU released a yakgwa cookie made in collaboration with a Seoul café, which CU said sold 100,000 units within five days of its launch, and Seven-Eleven released a line of seven yakgwa-based desserts. In 2026, Burger King Korea released soft-serve ice cream desserts topped with mini yakgwa in a collaboration with a traditional dessert brand.

== Research and further developments ==
A report released by the food science and biotechnology department in Inha University, South Korea researched the effects of jupcheong (즙청; jeubcheong; lit. 'juice syrup') with and without ginger powder on the lipids and antioxidants of yakgwa. The dough pieces were deep fried in soybean oil at 90 to 150 °C, soaked in syrup with and without ginger powder, and lastly stored at 30 °C in the dark for 8 weeks. It was found that jupcheong, especially with ginger, could improve the lipid oxidative stability of yakgwa by higher protection of tocopherols and lignans than polyphenols from degradation, and tocopherols were the most important antioxidants in reducing lipid oxidation of yakgwa. The use of ginger powder instead of the traditional ginger juice used in the recipe helps support the lipid oxidative in yakgwa; the lipid oxidative in yakgwa deteriorates fat and has other health benefits.

Additionally, in 2014 the Dong-Eui University academic cooperation foundation and Sancheon Korea medicine yakchs patent application for health functional yakgwa. The Korean intellectual released the following abstract, "The present invention relates to a health functional fried honey cake using medicinal plants and a method for manufacturing the same. The health functional fried honey cake according to the present invention is manufactured by being baked in an oven instead of a traditional way using Eucommia, monarchy, Angelica, mulberry leaves, or tea powder, thereby reducing more calories and fat than when fried honey cake is manufactured by the traditional way and improving antioxidant functions, flavor, and health".

== See also ==
- List of Korean desserts
