= Maejap-gwa =

Korean deep fried sweet dessert

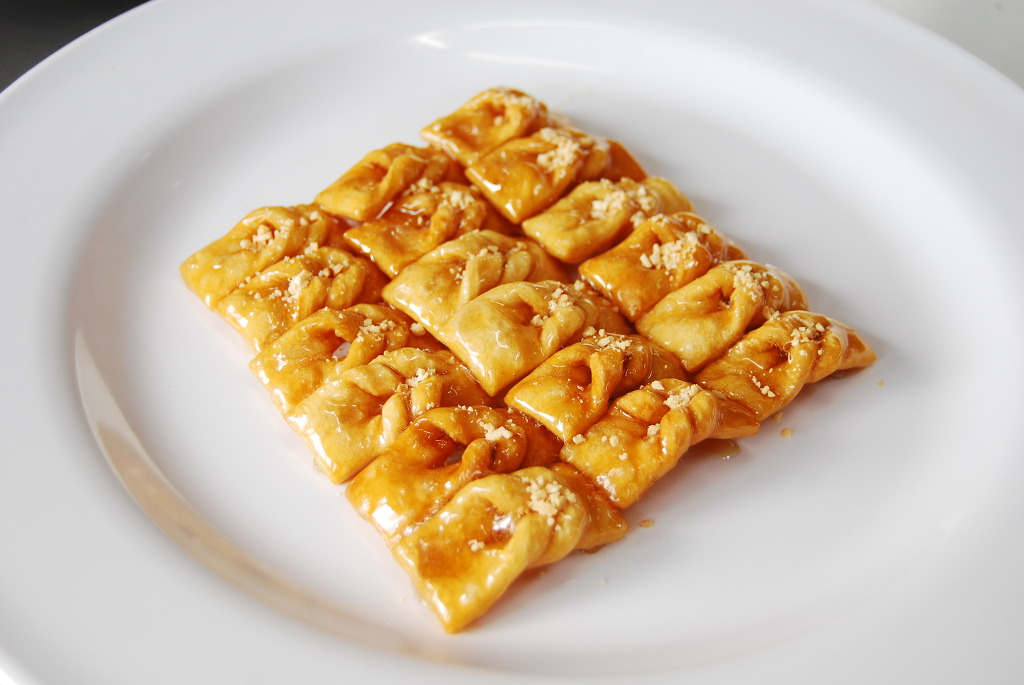
- Alternative names: Maejak-gwa, tarae-gwa
- Type: Yumil-gwa
- Place of origin: Korea
- Associated cuisine: Korean cuisine
- Food energy (per 4 serving): 150 kcal (630 kJ)

Korean name
- Hangul: 매잡과
- Hanja: 梅雜菓
- RR: maejapgwa
- MR: maejapkwa
- IPA: [mɛ.dʑap̚.k͈wa]

Alternate name
- Hangul: 매작과; 타래과
- Hanja: 梅雀菓; 타래菓
- RR: maejakgwa; taraegwa
- MR: maejakkwa; t'araegwa
- IPA: [mɛ.dʑak̚.k͈wa]; [tʰa.ɾɛ.ɡwa]

Maejap-gwa (Korean: 매잡과; Hanja: 梅雜菓), also called maejak-gwa (매작과; 梅雀菓) or tarae-gwa (타래과), is a ribbon-shaped hangwa (traditional Korean confection).

== Preparation ==
Wheat flour is kneaded with ginger juice and water, then rolled into a flat sheet. The sheet is then cut into small rectangles with three slits in the middle, and the end of each piece is put through the middle slit. The ribbons are then deep-fried, coated in honey or jocheong followed by chopped pine nuts.

== Gallery ==
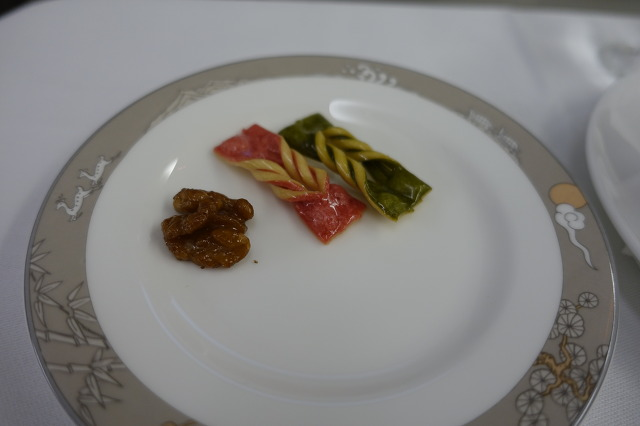
Walnut jeonggwa (left) and maejap-gwa (right), from an Asiana Airlines in-flight meal

== See also ==
- Angel wings
- Khapse
- Yumil-gwa
