= Papaya milk =

Taiwanese milk beverage

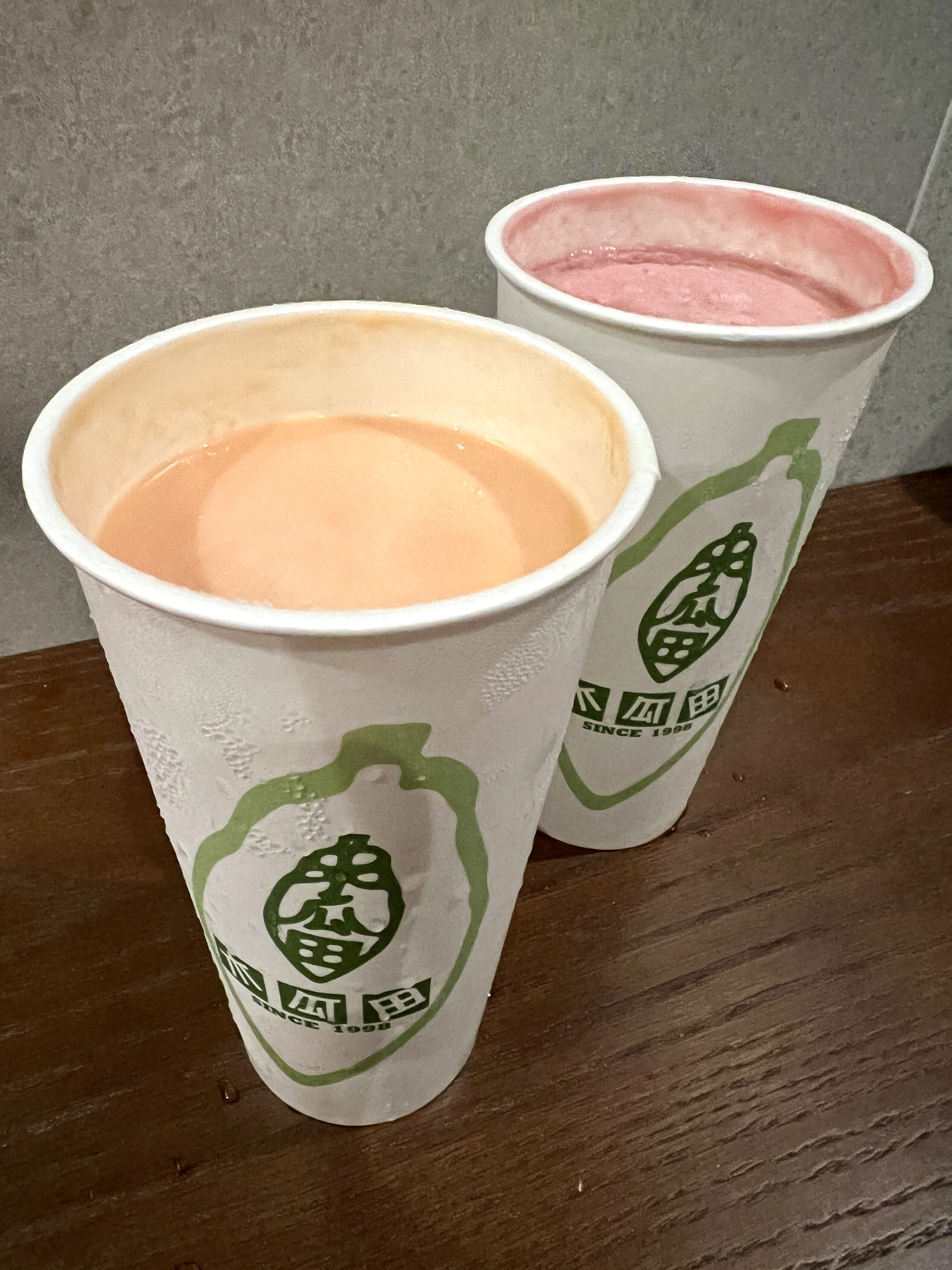
- Type: Milk
- Manufacturer: Uni-President Enterprises Corporation
- Origin: Taiwan
- Introduced: 1991
- Color: Light orange

Papaya milk (Chinese: 木瓜牛乳; pinyin: mùguā niúrǔ) is a Taiwanese milk beverage made from fresh papaya and milk, the most common of which is produced by Uni-President Enterprises Corporation in Taiwan.

== Flavour ==
The beverage consists of more than 50 percent milk and concentrated papaya juice. Papaya milk has a creamy and slightly sweet flavour with a light orange colour.

== History ==
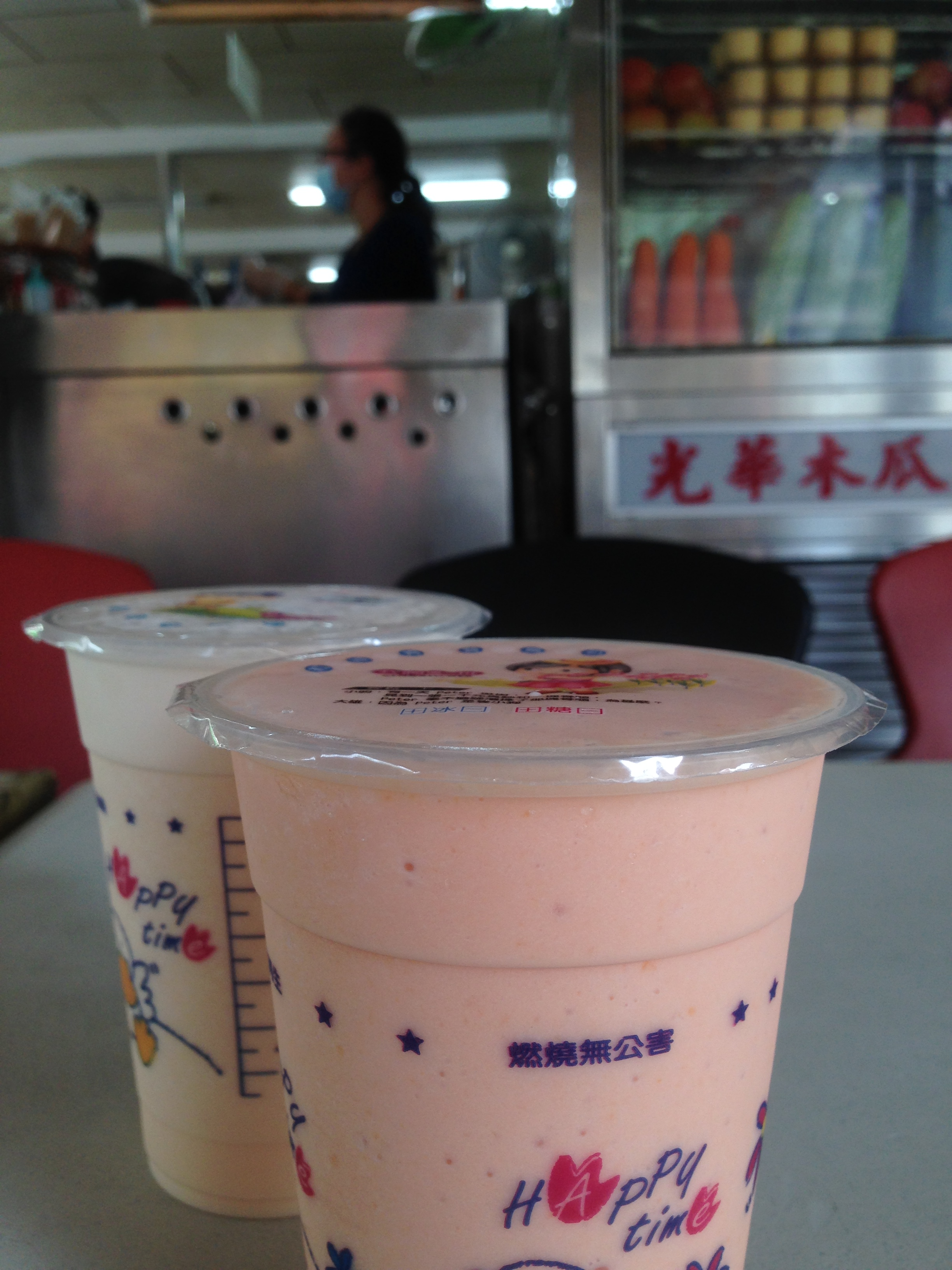
Papaya milk at a Taiwanese night market.

Papaya milk has been a staple in Taiwan for decades. Its origins are tied to Taiwan's geographic location, which supports the growth of both tropical fruits and dairy production. The drink gained popularity in the 1970s, a period marked by significant agricultural and industrial development in Taiwan. The introduction of household appliances like refrigerators and blenders during this time further boosted the drink's popularity, as they made it easier to prepare fresh papaya milk at home.

The earliest milk farms in Taiwan were established during the Japanese colonial era. However, it was not until the 1960s that the Taiwanese government began promoting dairy production to reduce reliance on imported milk powder. This initiative included sending young farmers abroad for professional training and encouraging milk consumption among school children. These efforts laid the foundation for the widespread availability of milk, which, combined with locally grown papayas, led to the creation of papaya milk.

Legend has it that a night market vendor first experimented with blending milk and various fruits, discovering that papaya combined with milk was particularly delicious. This combination quickly caught on, becoming a favourite among locals.

== Global popularity ==
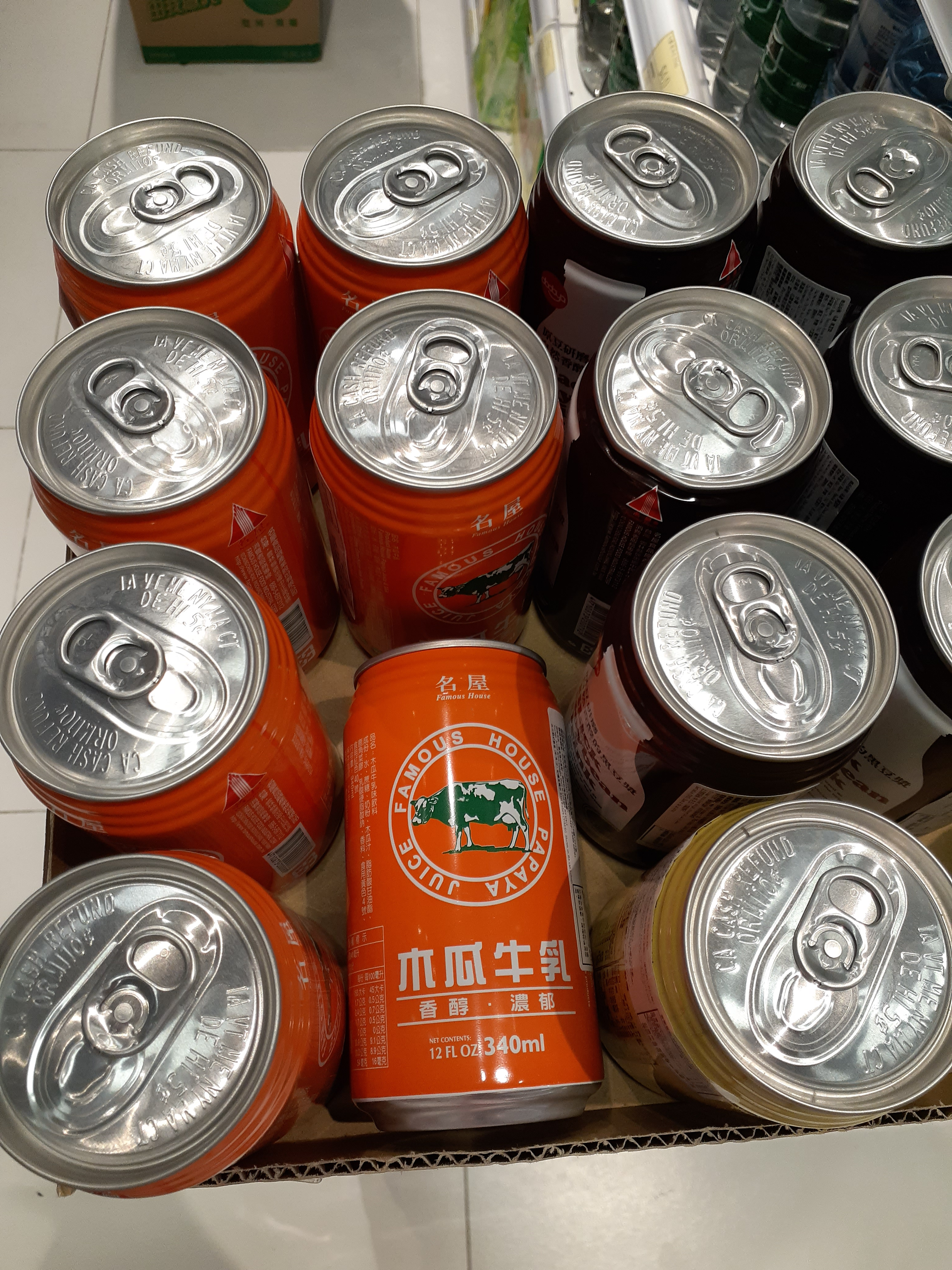
Canned papaya milk in Hong Kong.

Despite its popularity in Taiwan, papaya milk has not achieved the same level of international recognition as bubble tea. The flavour profile of papaya milk, with its distinctive aroma, may not appeal to everyone. Additionally, the enzyme papain found in papayas can break down the protein in milk, causing the drink to become bitter if not consumed quickly. To address this, commercially produced papaya milk often undergoes high-temperature processing to deactivate the enzymes, or uses papaya powder instead of fresh fruit.

However, the drink has found a following in parts of Asia, including Hong Kong and Singapore, where it is appreciated for its nutritional benefits and refreshing taste. Raw papaya milk is believed to promote gut health and immunity due to the presence of papain, an enzyme that aids digestion.

== See also ==
- Banana Flavored Milk
- Watermelon milk
