= Mandu-gwa =

Korean sweet dumpling

- Type: Yumil-gwa
- Place of origin: Korea
- Associated cuisine: Korean cuisine
- Main ingredients: Wheat flour, jujube, cinnamon powder, honey
- Ingredients generally used: Sesame oil, ginger juice, cheongju

Korean name
- Hangul: 만두과
- Hanja: 饅頭菓
- RR: mandugwa
- MR: mandugwa
- IPA: [man.du.ɡwa]

Mandu-gwa (Korean: 만두과; Hanja: 饅頭菓) is a Korean sweet dumpling filled with sweetened ingredients and coated with jocheong (rice syrup). It is a type of yumil-gwa, a deep-fried hangwa (Korean confection) made with wheat flour. Mandu means "dumplings" and gwa means "confection". Mandu-gwa is typically eaten as a dessert or bamcham (late-night snack).

== Preparation ==
The dough is prepared by sifting wheat flour and kneading it with sesame oil, honey, ginger juice and clear, refined rice wine known as cheongju. The filling is usually made by mixing steamed, deseeded and minced jujube, cinnamon powder and honey. Only a small amount of filling is put on a flattened piece of dough. The covering should be thick, to prevent the confectionery from bursting out after it is deep-fried. After frying the dough, the dumpling is marinated in jocheong (rice syrup).

== See also ==
- Qatayef (a similar Arab dessert)
