= Pounding =

Ritual in Christianity

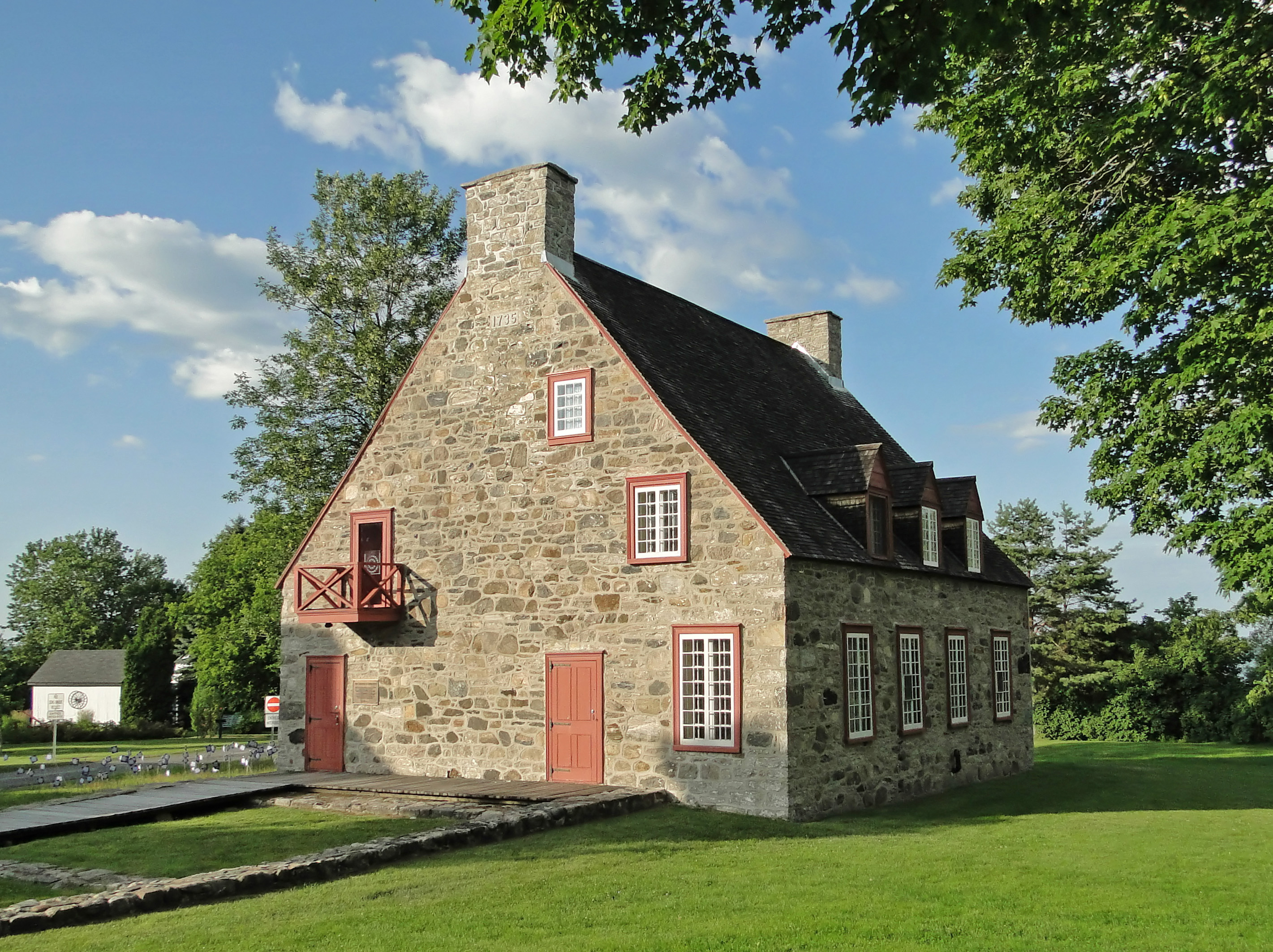
Pounding often takes place at the parsonage of a church.

Pounding is a ritual in Christianity in which a new priest or minister is given gifts by members of the congregation of that church at which he is assigned to preach. The practice can be traced back to at least the 19th century, when communicants of a church visited the parsonage and dropped off a pound of an item of food, such as "coffee, sugar, flour or honey." When dropping off items to help the new clergyman out, congregants would spend time with him, also getting to know his family in cases of Christian denominations that permit married clerics. The practice of pounding takes place across Christendom, in the countries of Africa as well as those of North America. It is done throughout many Christian denominations, including the Methodist, United Brethren, and Quaker traditions, among others.

Poundings are also commonly held for newlyweds or couples moving into a new home.
