= Banana milk =

Dairy product

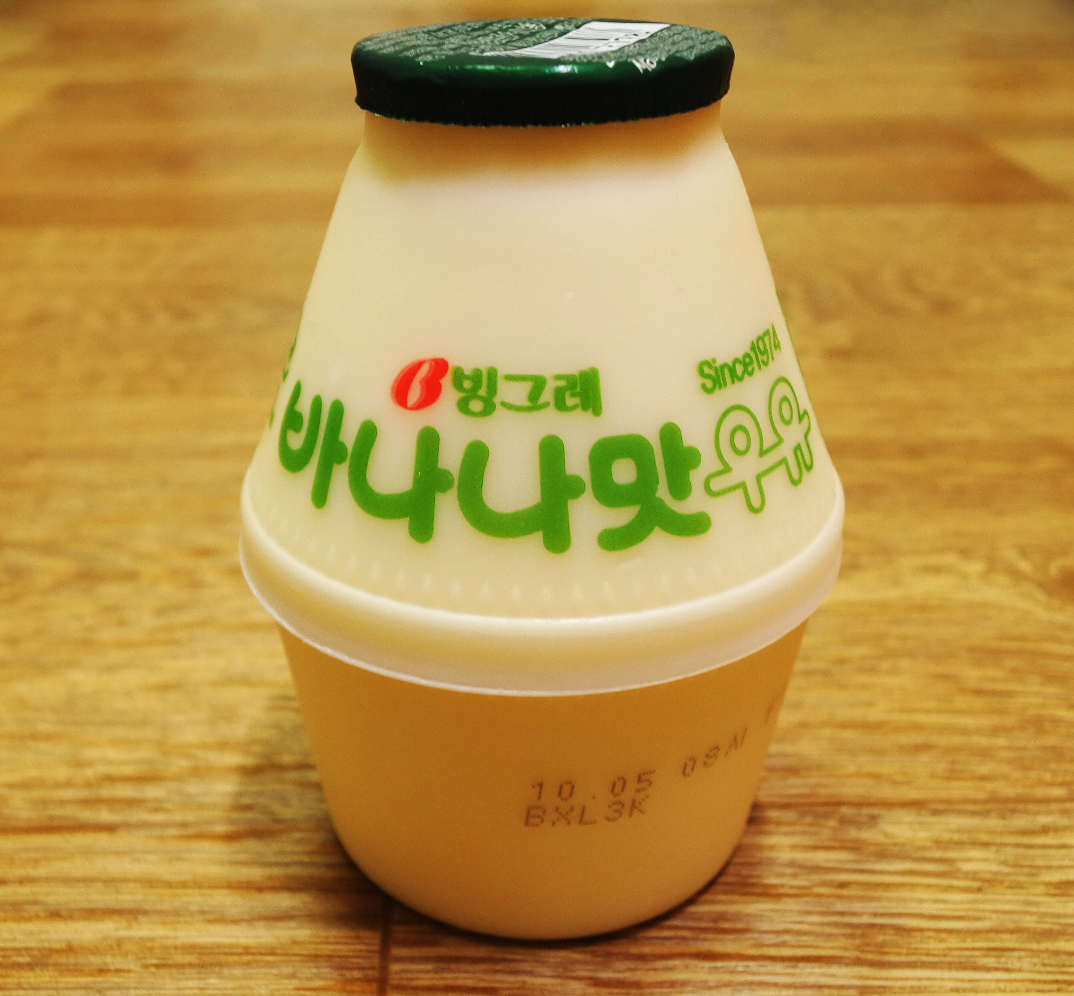
Binggrae Banana Flavored Milk is known for the moon jar-like container shape

Banana milk is a dairy product made by combining bananas and dairy or non-dairy milk, originally produced in South Korea. It is typically made with banana concentrate or puree rather than solely artificial flavoring.

== South Korea ==
In South Korea, banana milk was developed amid growth of soft drink and dairy markets in the 1970s. Malnutrition was still common following the Korean War, and the government was encouraging citizens to drink more milk for health and economic reasons, inspired by a trip the president took to Germany. At the same time, both milk and bananas were considered luxury foods. The country's climate is too cold to grow bananas and they were not yet cheaply imported, and milk was not broadly palatable.

The first banana milk product, Banana Flavored Milk by Binggrae, became especially popular after it was released in 1974, known for its unusual bottle design that resembles traditional moon jars. The company has more than 80% of the market in South Korea and operates banana milk-themed cafes in Seoul and Jeju Island. The brand and shape of the containers are closely associated with the drink, and with Korean culture and the country's convenience store culture specifically. The ingredients and packaging have not substantially changed over the years, and multiple writers have attributed part of its longevity to multi-generational childhood memory. On the fiftieth anniversary of the product going to market, the company applied to have it registered as a National Registered Cultural Heritage, leading to controversy over what can qualify for the designation. Koreans buy about 800,000 bottles of banana milk daily.

Seoul Economic Daily called banana milk "a signature K-food item among foreign tourists in Korea". It is used to make a banana latte ("ddungba latte" in Korea, using the slang term for Binggrae's product), combining it with coffee and optionally ice, as well as milkshakes and desserts. Other brands include Seoul Milk, Haio, Yonsei Milk, and Nesquik.

== International consumption ==
Banana milk-themed food truck in Japan

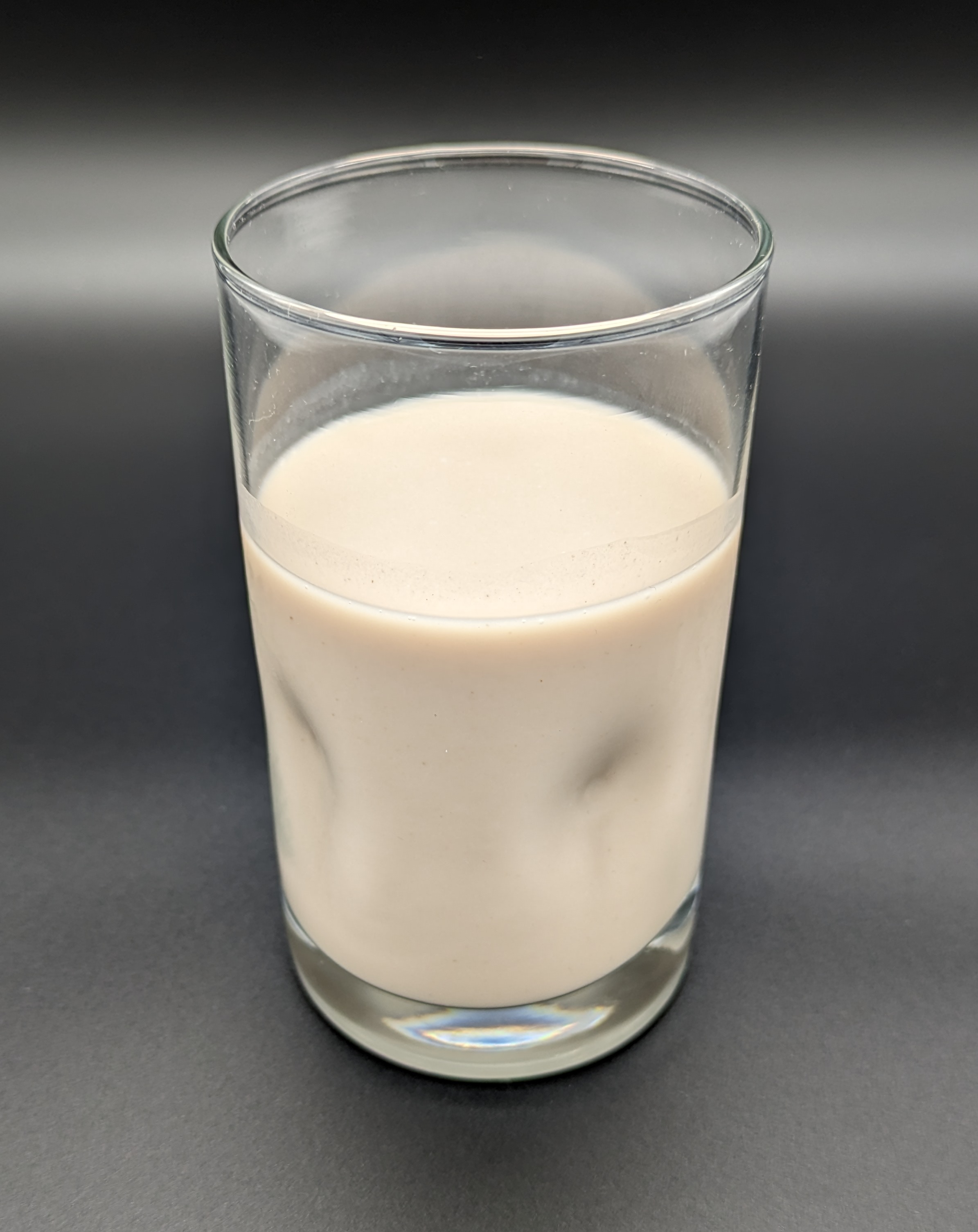
Non-dairy banana milk by Mooala

While it is associated with Korean culture, it is sold in many international markets, either via Korean exports or local manufacturers. Binggrae began exporting banana milk to the United States in 2004, and China in 2008. The drink attracted international attention as part of the Korean Wave, with K-pop fans seeing entertainers like Jung Kook of BTS, U-know Yunho of TVXQ, and Taemin of Shinee drinking it. Buzzfeed News called it "the true gem of Korean snacks" in 2018. Banana milk coffee went viral on TikTok in 2025-2026 after former Nvidia CEO Jensen Huang was seen drinking it during a meeting, and celebrities like Hailey Bieber, Charlie Puth, and Emma Roberts posted about it on social media. Vogue published an article with the headline calling it "the unexpected it-girl obsession". Binggrae alone reported nearly double the international sales from 2022-2026. In a positive review of the trend, The Guardian said banana milk is "a complex, multi-layered flavor, and once you’ve tasted it with coffee you’ll wonder how you ever doubted it could be anything but delicious".

== Ingredients ==
Banana milk is typically made with banana concentrate or puree rather than solely rely on an artificial flavoring, plus a dairy or non-dairy base. While the original Korean product uses cow's milk, there are several non-dairy products using oat, sunflower, or almond milk produced by companies like Mylk, Mooala, and Blue Diamond. Some are mixed with additional flavors, like cinnamon and salt in Mooala's product, which also uses sunflower seeds.
