= Mooala =

American beverage company

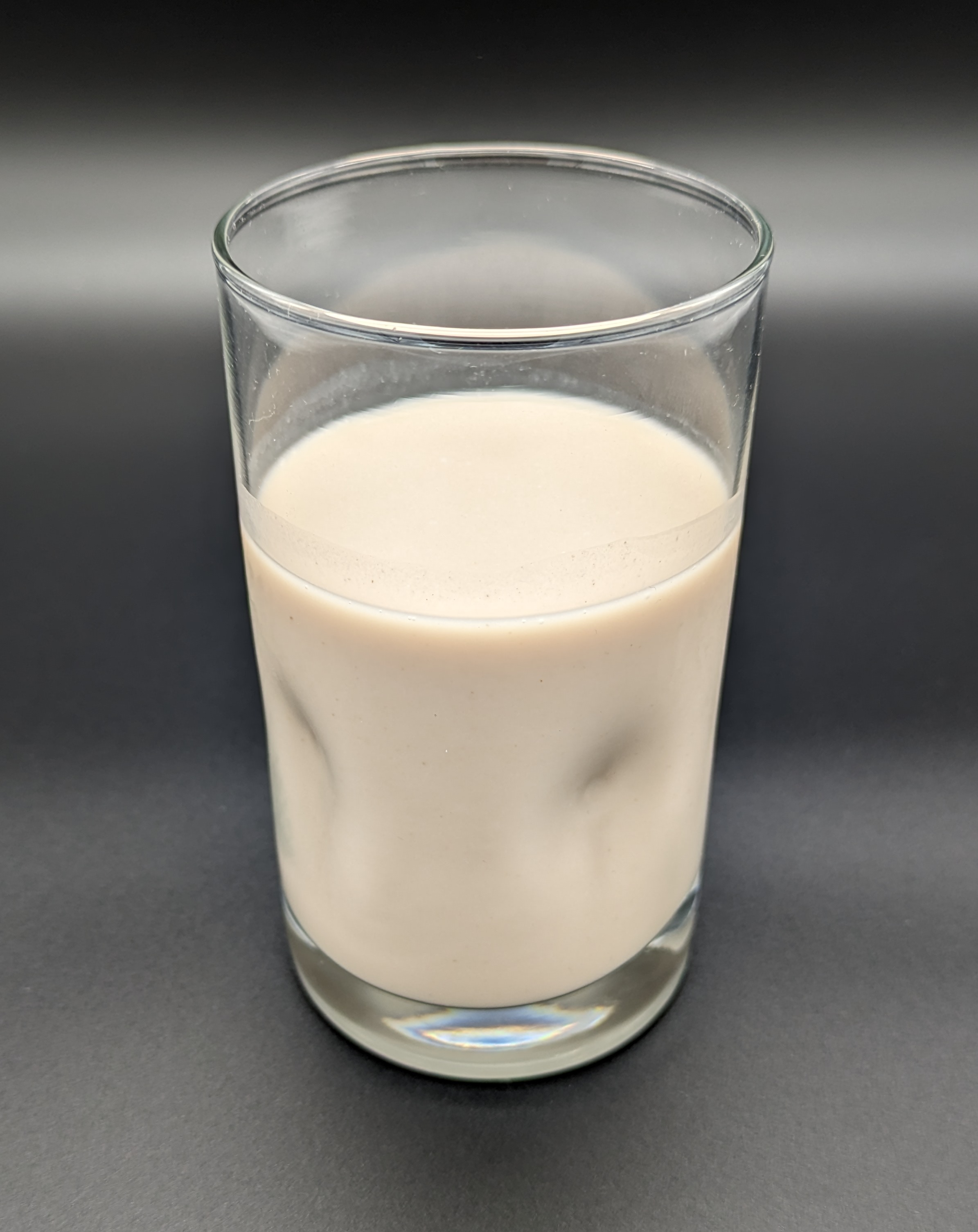
- Mooala bananamilk
- Industry: Beverage
- Founded: November 30, 2012; 13 years ago Dallas, Texas, U.S.
- Founders: Jeff Richards
- Headquarters: Dallas, Texas, U.S.
- Key people: Jeff Richards (Founder and CEO)
- Products: Plant-based dairy-alternative beverages and creamers
- Website: mooala.com

Mooala Brands, LLC, or simply Mooala, is an American beverage company headquartered in Dallas, Texas. Primarily known for their "bananamilk" product, the company manufactures various dairy substitute products that are organic and plant-based.

== History ==
Jeff Richards founded Mooala Brands, LLC on November 30, 2012, in Dallas, Texas. After being diagnosed as lactose intolerant in 2012, Richards began experimenting with different recipes to find a dairy-alternative milk. Due to his mild nut allergy, Richards began with bananas because, as he noted, they "are free of the top eight allergens." Richards then "took the recipe to the University of Minnesota to make sure it was something that could be commercially produced." He and the university were able to "achieve a rich, creamy flavor" using a batching and cooking process including bananas, sunflower seed butter, cinnamon, and sea salt. The resulting flavor is akin to banana nut bread.

Mooala products were first introduced at local Royal Blue Grocery stores in Dallas, in August 2016. The company's catalog initially included just beverages, notably their "bananamilk" line, but also almond milk and oat milk variants. In February 2018, Mooala announced the company raised $5 million in equity capital in order to facilitate expansion. Fast Company documented Mooala as having the fastest growth in 2018 year-over-year sales "among newcomers to the alt-milk category."

In July 2019, Mooala launched plant-based creamers. In November, Mooala completed a $8.3 million Series A equity financing. By this time, Mooala was sold in major grocery chains such as Whole Foods, Kroger, and Costco, among others.

In early 2020, the company experienced high levels of growth, compared to its 2019 figures. However, the COVID-19 pandemic in the United States invoked fears of meat shortages, resulting in the company experiencing further growth as part of the broader growth in the plant-based industry. In October, the company expanded to include non-perishable versions of its products. In December, Mooala launched the beverage industry's first keto vegan milk.

== Reception ==
The original banana milk variant has received generally positive reception from online reviewers and general consumers, as well as media publications. In 2019, Sara Cagle of Brit + Co wrote positively of Mooala's banana milk, commenting that "the lightly sweet blend of water and puréed bananas differs from its more neutral non-dairy predecessors in that it actually tastes like its main ingredient — bananas." Writing for CNET, Amanda Capritto opined that the banana milk "is actually rather yummy (if you like bananas)," adding that "taste-wise, banana milk compares to sipping on a 'healthified' milkshake. It's sweet, slightly fruity and super-creamy."

When analyzing its health benefits, Shape wrote that "In general, banana milk might seem like a winner, especially since it boasts essential nutrients and half the calories and two-thirds the fat of two-percent milk," but added that its lack of protein and fiber should be noted.
