= Hwangap =

Tradition in East and Southeast Asia

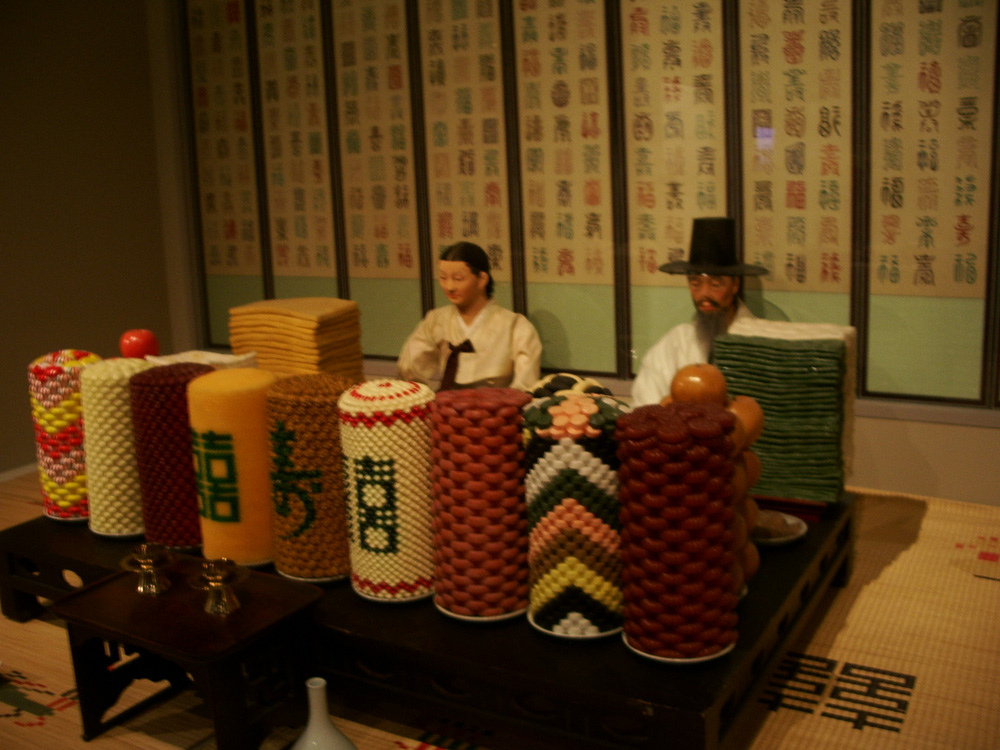
- A museum display of a gobaesang, a traditional table setting for hwangap

Korean name
- Hangul: 환갑
- Hanja: 還甲
Transcriptions
- Revised Romanization: Hwangap
- McCune–Reischauer: Hwan'gap

In Korea, the sixtieth birthday is known as hwangap, hoegap (회갑; 回甲), jugap (주갑; 周甲), gapnyeon (갑년; 甲年), or hwallyeok (환력; 還曆). The sixtieth birthday is according to one's age per the international reckoning and not by Korean age. In other words, one's Korean age will actually be 61 at the time of the hwangap.

== Description ==
The traditional lunisolar calendars in the Sinosphere (Chinese calendar, Japanese calendar, Korean calendar) observe sexagenary cycles, i.e. cycles of sixty years. Thus, living sixty years had special significance as one completed a full cycle. Some saw it as the start of a second lifetime, and thus as an opportunity to give up some responsibility and return to enjoying life as children do.

== Traditional celebrations ==
The date of the ceremony was not always on the actual birthday. This was for superstitious reasons: the ceremony date would be chosen to avoid inauspicious days. It was also considered bad luck to hold a ceremony after the actual birthday, and thus people would only hold it before.

The ceremony is traditionally a major affair, with descendants inviting the extended family for an event that can sometimes last multiple days, for wealthier families. Ceremonies can also be arranged by subordinates for superiors, for example students for teachers or disciples for religious leaders. The ceremony is seen as an expression of filial piety. Costs for the ceremony are typically covered by the descendants or subordinates.

Traditionally ceremonies were held at the home. Preparations for the ceremony would begin days in advance, and involve the brewing of alcohol, preparation of foods and snacks, and preparation of facilities for guests. Neighbors and relatives would come to assist in this process. Early on the morning of the hwangap, the celebrated person would pay their respects to their ancestral shrine.

Breakfast would be served in the anbang or daecheong (open area of house). The honored person and their spouse, dressed in their finest clothes, would be prominently seated in front of a byeongpung (folding screen) and behind a large table such as a gyojasang (교자상; 交子床). Food offerings are to be grander than usual, with a mandatory serving of miyeok-guk. Also on the table are foods piled high in decorative fashion (typically in cylinders), such as chestnuts, jujubes, snacks, yakgwa, persimmons, and more. Other decorations would also be placed on the table, taking the shapes of flowers, dragons, turtles, or cranes. Also present is a typically separate table of ceremonial alcohol and cups (헌주상; 獻酒床; heonjusang). Traditional music, sometimes performed by kisaeng, would also be performed during the event. Guests would arrive, bringing gifts of clothing, alcohol, fruit, and rice.

Before breakfast is eaten, the eldest son and his spouse would approach the table, bow deeply, raise glasses of ceremonial alcohol, then bow deeply again. Afterwards, in descending order by age, younger siblings would follow suit and pay tribute to the honored person. They are then followed by extended family and other peoples. In cases where the parents of the honored person are alive, they too can participate in paying their respects, sometimes symbolically and/or jokingly wearing brightly colored clothing typical of children.

Afterwards, breakfast is then consumed either in that room or in a separate area. Often strangers and passersby are invited to join; it is traditionally considered a sign of virtue and social status to have many guests at one's hwangap. Speeches are given about the person's life. Various traditional performances and games can take place during the hwangap. If the person and their guests were well-educated, poetry could be composed and read during the hwangap.

The year after the hwangap, another smaller ceremony called a jingap (진갑; 進甲) can also be held. This is not as large as the hwangap, but also larger than a typical birthday celebration. Afterwards, there are a number of other possible (albeit rarer) celebrations until the end of one's life: the 60th wedding anniversary can be celebrated, there is a 70th birthday ceremony (고희; 古稀; gohui), a 77th birthday (희수; 喜壽; huisu), and 88th birthday (미수; 米壽; misu). These later birthdays are of similar scale to the jingap.

== Modern celebrations ==
With increasing life expectancies, the hwangap celebration has been given a lesser significance than before. Some parents reportedly do not expect to receive a ceremony at all, and instead weigh later ceremonies, such as the gohui, higher. This is also possibly impacted by the falling numbers of elderly people who live with their children. Larger ceremonies are possibly more typical in rural areas than they are in urban.

In some instances, only close family members get together to have a big meal. Some rent out spaces in banquet halls or restaurants. Some hold separate events for closer family and guests.

With changing religious practices in Korea, the ceremony has become secularized or Christianized. Some Christian families choose to deemphasize the aspects of the hwangap that involved ancestor worship. In one instance described in a 1991 paper, a family's hwangap involved a Catholic sermon and the taking of communion.

The ceremony has been observed by members of the Korean diaspora. The ceremony was the subject of a 2009 play called "American Hwangap" by a Korean-American playwright.

== See also ==
- Second Bar Mitzvah
- Dol-janchi, the one year birthday celebration in Korea
