= Binggrae =

South Korean food and beverage corporation

Binggrae Co., Ltd.
- Native name: 주식 회사 빙그레
- Type: Public
- Traded as: KRX: 005180
- Industry: Food and beverage
- Predecessor: Daeil Corporation: 1967; Daeil Dairy: 1971
- Founded: 13 September 1967; 59 years ago
- Founder: Hong Soon-ji (홍순지)
- Headquarters: 11-12F, B Building, 19, Seosomun-ro 11-gil, Jung-gu (Jeong-dong 34-5, Baejaejeong-dong Building), Seoul, South Korea
- Area served: Worldwide
- Key people: Jeong Chang-won (CEO), Ko Jae-hak (Key Executive), Choi Gang-hun (Key Executive), Park Jung-hwan (Board member), Kim Ho-yeon (board member), Gang Myeong-gil (board member)
- Revenue: ▲ ₩1,147,435,000,000 $913,094,005.72
- Operating income: ▼ ₩26,244,000,000 $20,886,174.55
- Net income: ▼ ₩19,327,000,000 $15,381,309.84
- Owners: Kim Ho-yeon: 36.75%, Others: 40.89% National Pension Service: 6.48%
- Number of employees: 4,981 (2024)
- Website: http://www.bing.co.kr (Korean) http://eng.bing.co.kr/ (English)

Binggrae Co., Ltd. (Korean: 빙그레; lit. 'smile'), is a South Korean multinational food and beverage corporation that manufactures ice cream, milk products, and snacks. Binggrae was founded in 1967 by Hong Soon-ji (Note: In this Korean name, the family name is Hong.) as Daeil Corporation (Korean: 대일양행; Hanja: 對日洋行). The B in the Binggrae Logo is modeled after a heart. It is known for releasing the first banana milk in 1974, Banana Flavored Milk, which became culturally important in South Korea.

== History ==
=== 1960–1999 ===
Hong Soon-ji (Korean: 홍순지) founded Daeil Corporation on 13 September 1967. Hong had founded the company with experience from making ice cream in Vietnam and selling it to the U.S. military in the 1960s. In 1971, Hong changed the name of the company to Daeil Dairy. In 1972, Daeil Dairy made a technological partnership with Foremost McKesson Inc., a company based in the United States. Due to handling issues, the Korea Explosives Group (later known as the Hanwha Group) acquired Daeil Dairy in 1973. Donong Plant 1 was also completed in Namyangju in 1973. In 1974, Binggrae's first mainstream products were released. Together (투게더), the first carton ice cream product made from raw milk in Korea was released in January of that year, and Banana Flavored Milk (바나나 맛 우유), a milk beverage was released in June. Starting in 1977, Daeil entered the fermented milk business (yogurt). In 1976, the partnership with Foremost Inc. ended, and the trademark was changed to Binggrae due to the Korean Language Purification Movement. In 1978, Daeil was listed on the Korea Stock Exchange. In 1982, Daeil Dairies was then renamed to Binggrae. The Gimhae Plant was completed in 1982. In 1984, Binggrae made a partnership with Nissin Foods to develop instant ramen, subsequently releasing urijib (우리집) ramen in 1986. In 1987, Binggrae opened the Binggrae Food Research Center and was designated as the official ice cream for the 1988 Seoul Olympics. In 1991, Ssamanco (싸만코), an ice cream version of bungeo-ppang that contains red beans was released. Binggrae declared independence from the Hanwha group in 1992. In January of that year, Melona (메로나, Pronounced Merona), a creamy melon ice cream was released. In 1993, Binggrae was designated as the official ramen and ice cream supplier of the Daejeon Expo.

=== 2000–present ===
In April 2003, Binggrae made a business alliance with Samyang Foods, and moved its ramen business to Pulmuone in the same month. As of 2010, around 5.3 billion bottles of Banana Flavored Milk have been sold across the country. Binggrae acquired Haitai Ice Cream Co., Ltd. March 2020. As a result of the acquisition, Binggrae now holds 40.7% of the South Korean Ice cream market, and sales rose 19.6% in 2021 to 1.14 trillion won (US$949 million). Additionally, 70% of South Korean Ice cream exports to the United States were Binggrae products as of 2020. December 2021, Binggrae started working with ramen manufacturer Paldo to re-launch their ramen.

Binggrae acquired Haitai Ice Cream backed by an argument to the Korea Fair Trade Commission that it should greenlight the acquisition proposal because it would block Lotte Confectionery from monopolizing the South Korean ice cream market and raising prices. After the acquisition, Binggrae increased ice cream prices (effectively annulling their promise). Binggrae raised the prices of products such as "Together" and "Melona" by 25 percent. Its rival Lotte Confectionery also increased the prices of some of its products by the same percentage, thus making the ice cream market more expensive. Binggrae justified the price hikes with rising costs of imported materials. The company was fined 135 billion won for price fixing in 2022.

== Marketing ==
In the late 1980s to mid 1990s, Binggrae relied on television advertisements to spread its products. It promoted urijib (우리집) ramen by advertising it as the first ramen to contain tocopherol (1986), and promoted its "new" ramen by advertising it as a chemical free ramen (1996). Recently, Binggrae has turned to Korean idols and actors to promote its products. It promoted "super cone" with the Kpop group Wanna One in 2018, and estimated its sales would reach 10 billion won in sales by the end of the year, its Banana Flavored Milk with actor Ju Ji-hoon in 2021, and its Yoplait products with actress Lee Se-young starting in 2022. To compete with other food and beverage corporations, Binggrae has created its own "in-universe" with a backstory and characters. According to the JoongAng Ilbo, Binggrae has made Prince Binggraeus, a character, "the embodiment of Binggrae's identity". Prince Binggraeus is stylized to make parts of his outfit resemble and represent its products. For example, he carries a staff that is partially made of Melona and the tip being their crab snack kkotgerang (꽃게랑). Due to the "in-universe" advertisement campaign, Binggrae became the first South Korean food and beverage company to accumulate over 100,000 subscribers on YouTube.

== Main products ==
Dairy: Banana Flavored Milk (1974), Yoplait (1983), Yoplait Dr. Capsule, Greek Yogurt Yopa, Acaffera, Oprut, True Milk

Ice Cream: Together (1974), Melona (1992), Heat Hunt (1989), BB Big (1975), Ssamanco (1991), Cledor, Babambar (originally Haitai's), Yomamddae (2004), Supercone, Ppongta

Snacks: Crab Snack (꽃게랑, 1986)

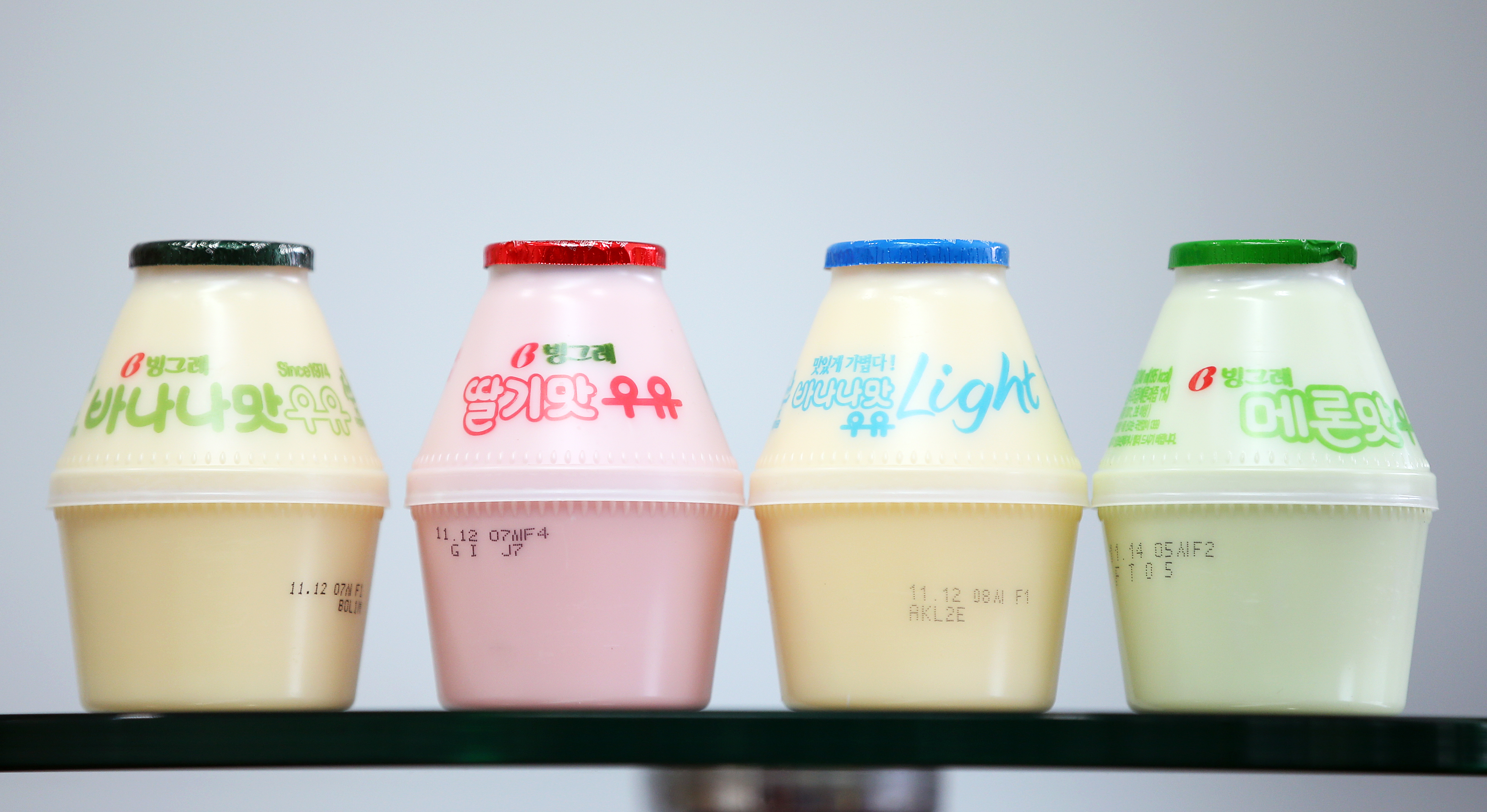
Banana Flavored Milk (and other flavors, like strawberry and honeydew)

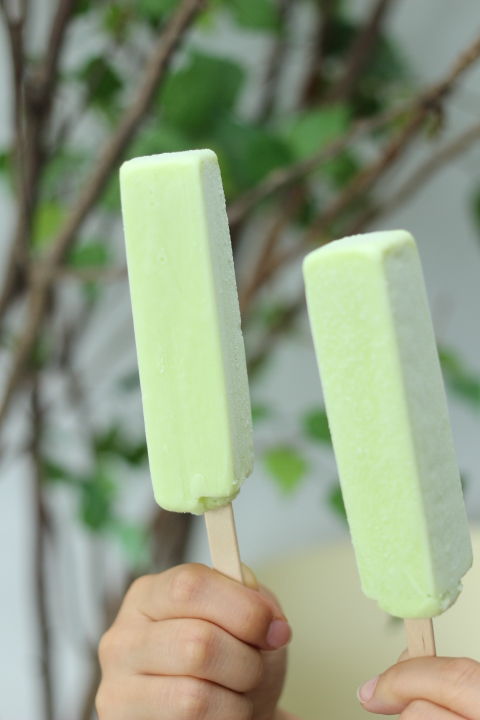
Melona bars out of wrapper

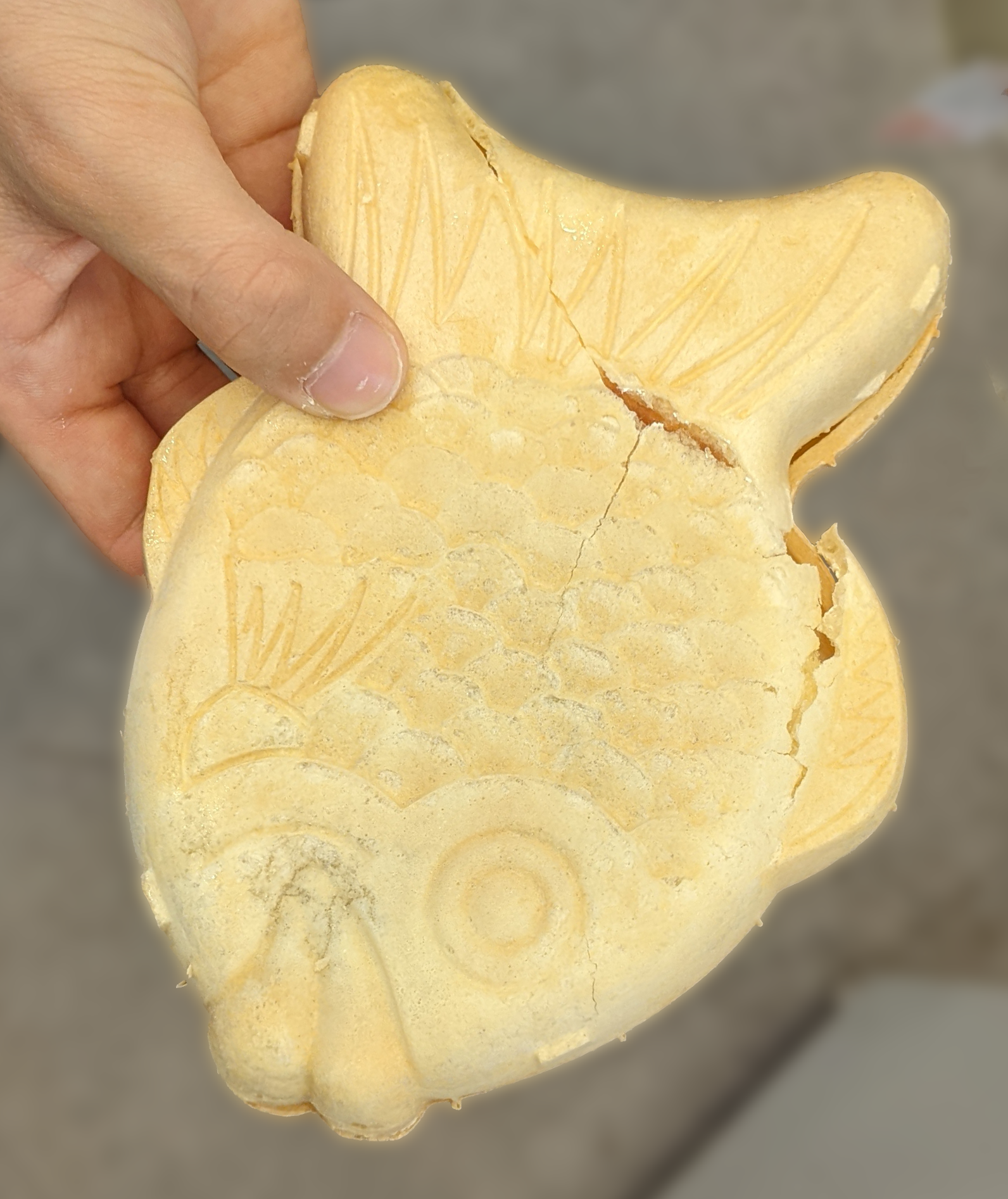
Bungeo Samanco

=== Banana Flavored Milk ===
Banana Flavored Milk, released in 1974, is Binggrae’s best-known dairy product, sold in a distinctive jar-shaped container. In recent years it has also drawn attention among foreign visitors to South Korea, and it was reported to be the top-selling item among foreign tourists at convenience stores in South Korea in 2025. Binggrae said its overseas sales of the product in 2025 were 96 percent higher than in 2021.

== Awards ==
- Binggrae's Together was selected for the grand prize at the 13th Korea National Brand awards, amounting to it holding this position for 11 consecutive years.
- Binggrae placed No. 268 on Forbes' "2021 edition of World's Best Employers"
- By 2020, Binggrae has held the No.1 in the KCSI (Korean Satisfaction Index) in the ice cream category for 14 consecutive years.
- By 2020: 1st place in KBPI brand power for 12 consecutive years (Banana milk)
- June 2014: 1st place in the ice cream category for the 5th consecutive year as a safe food company
- April 2014: Received the NBA National Brand Awards Together for 3 consecutive years in the ice cream category
- March 2014: Awarded the top prize in Gyeongsangnam-do agricultural and fishery products export tower
- October 2013: Received the grand prize in the marketing sector at the Korea Management Awards (Korea Management Association Consulting)
- September 2012: Ranked 1st in Korea's top safe food company for 3 consecutive years
- March 2010: Awarded the Bronze Tower Order of Industrial Service Merit (Taxpayer's Day)
- November 2009: Awarded the Transparent Management Grand Prize (selected by the Korea Accounting Information Society)
- March 2008: Received the Grand prize of corporate ethics management (by the Korea Academy of Business Ethics)
- Dec. 2004: Received the grand prize in the value management by the Korean Academic Society of Business Administration (KMAC)
- September 2004: 1st in the National Customer Satisfaction Index (NCSI) (milk, fermented milk sector)
- Apr. 2000: Yoplait, Together, ranked 1st in Korea's brand power (Korea Management Association Consulting)
- November 1999: Selected as 'Banana Flavored Milk', a product exhibition that brightened Korea in the 20th century

President Lee Myung-bak has mentioned Binggrae as "The food and beverage company Binggrae and the National Pension Service, are taking the initiative and setting a good example in hiring people with disabilities."

Binggrae was awarded the presidential commendation at the '2020 Low-Carbon Living Practice Online National Congress' for contributing to carbon neutrality

== Subsidiaries ==
- BC F&B Shanghai Co., Ltd. Founded August 2014
- BC F&B USA Corp. Founded July 2016
- BC F&B Vietnam Co., Ltd. Founded September 2019
- Haitai Ice Cream Co., Ltd. Acquired March 2020

== Headquarters and branches ==
Binggrae has 4 production plants: The Namyangju Plant, Gimhae Plant, Gwangju Plant, and Nonsan Plant.

- Headquarters: 11-12F, B Building, 19, Seosomun-ro 11-gil, Jung-gu (Jeong-dong 34–5, Baejaejeong-dong Building), Seoul
- Food Research Center and Namyangju Factory: 45 Dasanhwan-ro (Dasan-dong), Namyangju-si, Gyeonggi-do
- Gyeonggi Gwangju Factory: 23, Dokgogae-gil 86beon-gil, Gonjiam-eup, Gwangju-si, Gyeonggi-do (Samri)
- Nonsan Factory: 1413–9, Dongan-ro, Gayagok-myeon, Nonsan-si, Chungcheongnam-do (Yachon-ri)
- Gimhae Factory: 768, Gomoro, Hallim-myeon, Gimhae-si, Gyeongsangnam-do (Byeongdong-ri)

== See also ==
- List of companies of South Korea
- Banana Flavored Milk
- Melona
- Hanwha Group
- Hanwha Eagles
- Haitai
- Lotte Wellfood
- Nongshim
