= Banana Flavored Milk =

South Korean milk beverage

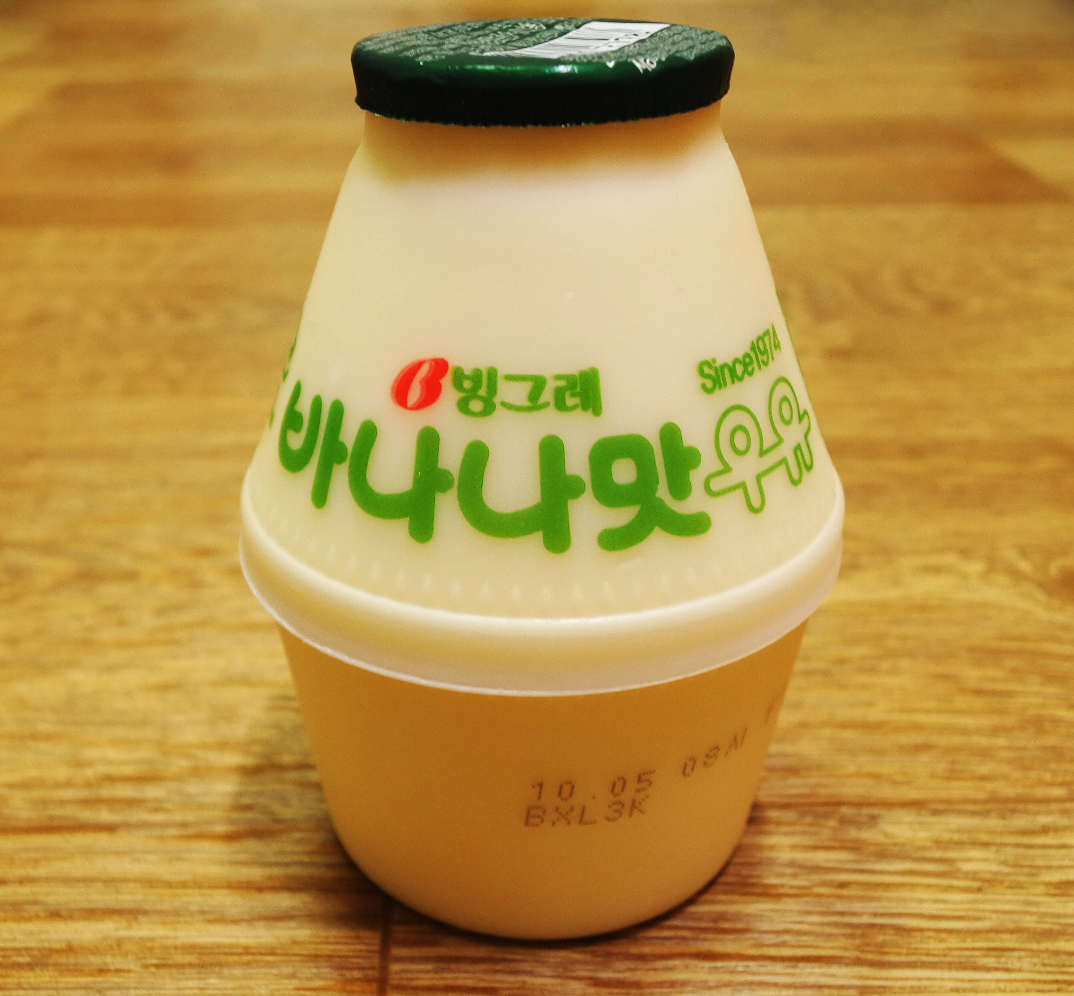
- Banana Flavored Milk
- Type: Milk
- Manufacturer: Binggrae
- Origin: South Korea
- Introduced: 1974
- Color: Light yellow
- Website: www.bing.co.kr/product/detail?PDT=123

Banana Flavored Milk (Korean: 바나나맛 우유) is a South Korean brand of banana milk produced by Binggrae.

== Flavor ==
The beverage consists of approximately 80 percent milk and a comparably small amount of banana flavor. Other regular flavors sold by Binggrae include strawberry, melon, banana light, coffee, and sugarless zero. Additionally, lychee, peach, mandarin, mulberry, and pumpkin-sweet potato were, or are currently, seasonal flavors.

== History ==
In the 1970s, the South Korean government wanted to encourage citizens to drink more milk. In response, because bananas were then considered a luxury in South Korea, Binggrae created Banana Flavored Milk, believing consumers would purchase the milk to taste the fruit. Banana Flavored Milk was first introduced to the South Korean market in 1974, the first banana milk product.

The company chose to sell its milk in polystyrene bottles to differentiate it from the glass bottles and plastic packages that were prevalent as milk containers in the 1970s. The bottle's design was inspired by traditional Korean moon jars, with an overhanging lip to prevent the milk from dripping onto the drinker's face.

In 2010, Banana Flavored Milk sold 800,000 bottles per day in South Korea, and 5.3 billion bottles had been sold across the country since the product was first developed. By 2012, annual sales of Banana Flavored Milk totaled 10 billion South Korean won.

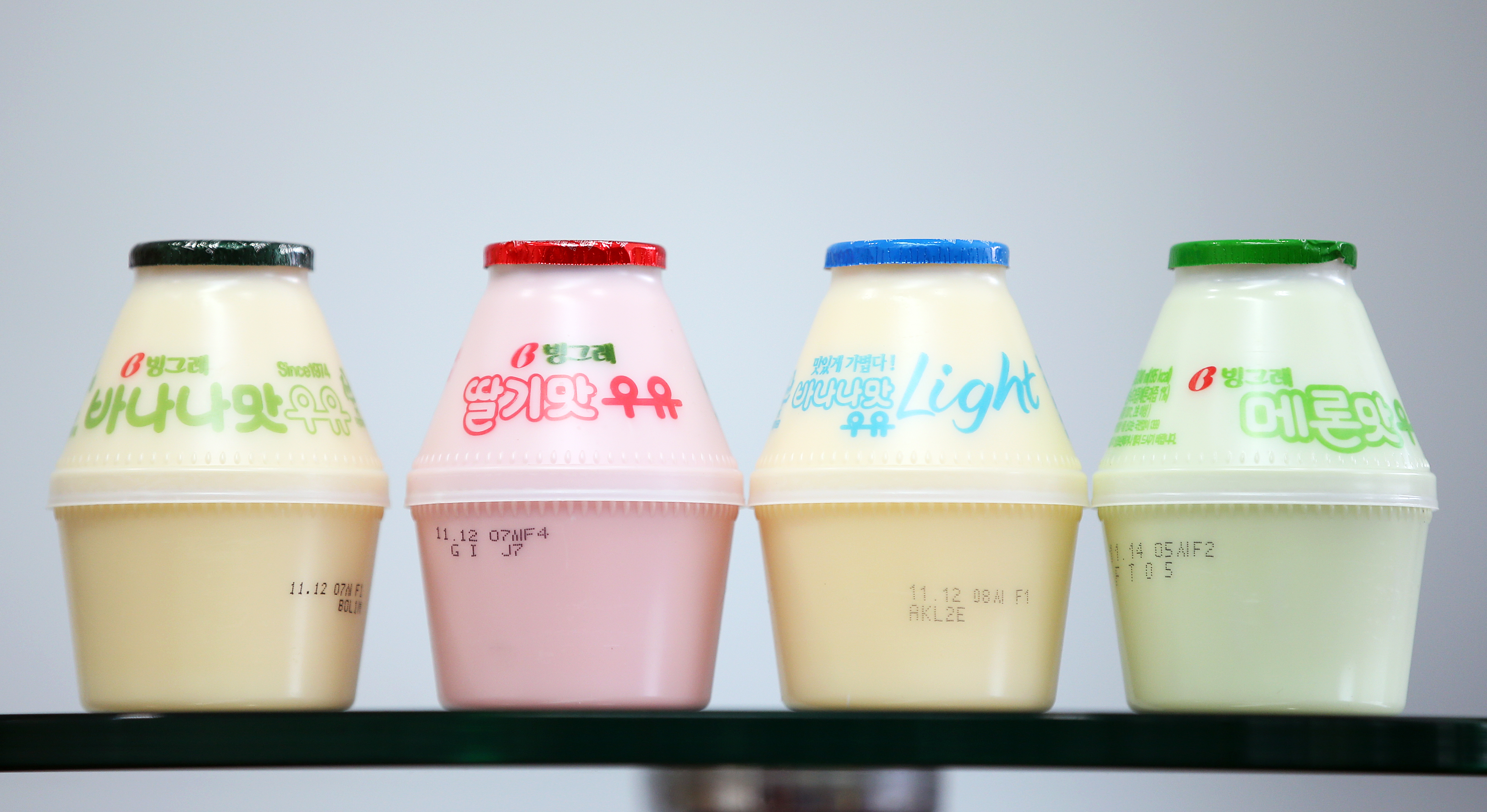
Variety flavors: banana, strawberry, banana light and melon.

The United States was the first international market to receive Banana Flavored Milk. The product was subsequently exported to other countries, including mainland China and Hong Kong, Taiwan, Japan, Canada, New Zealand, Thailand, Malaysia, Vietnam, and Cambodia. This expansion helped increase annual sales of the product from 700 million Korean won in 2010 to 15 billion Korean won in 2013.

Banana Flavored Milk was available at the Korean Pavilion of the 2017 Bangkok Food Fair, which greatly increased its popularity in Thailand. Its popularity also increased significantly in countries such as the United States after BTS singer Jungkook was seen drinking it.

== See also ==
- Papaya milk
- Watermelon milk
- Strawberry milk
