= Yumil-gwa =

Korean dessert

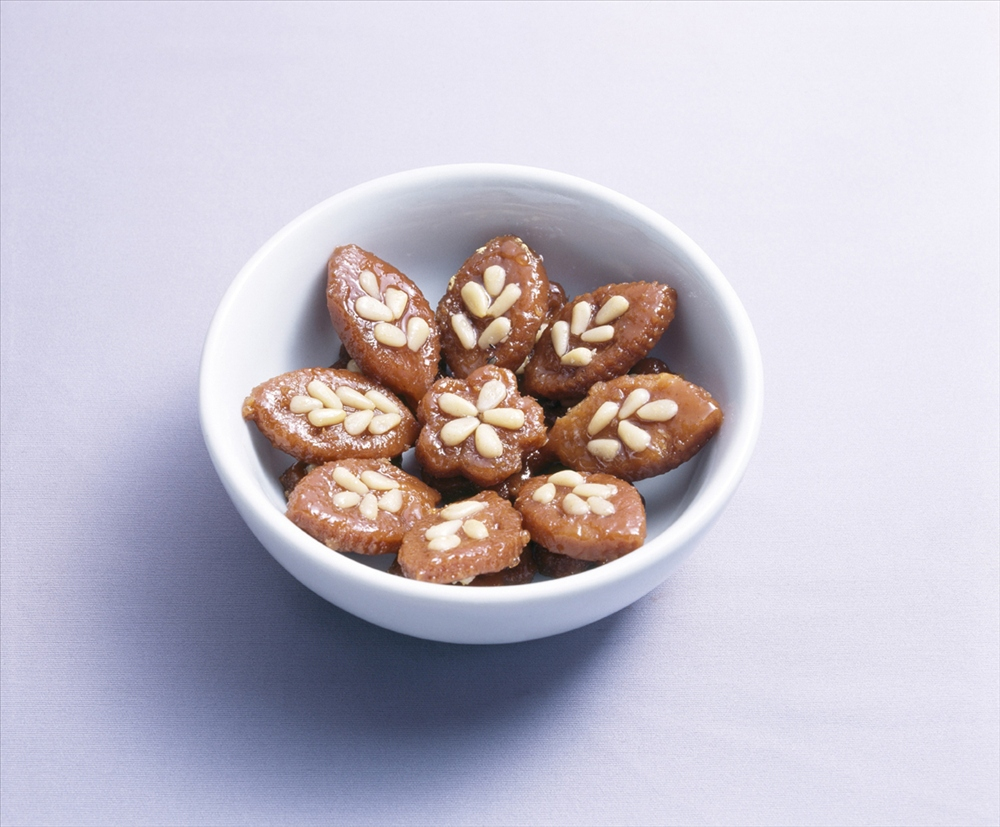
- Yakgwa, a variety of yumil-gwa
- Place of origin: Korea
- Associated cuisine: Korean cuisine

Korean name
- Hangul: 유밀과
- Hanja: 油蜜菓
- RR: yumilgwa
- MR: yumilgwa
- IPA: [ju.mil.ɡwa]

Yumil-gwa (Korean: 유밀과; Hanja: 油蜜菓) is a variety of hangwa, a traditional Korean confection. Different varieties of yumil-gwa can be made by combining a wheat flour dough with various ingredients such as: honey, cooking oil, cinnamon powder, nuts, ginger juice, jujube, and cheongju (rice wine).

== Etymology ==
The word yumil-gwa consists of three syllables: yu (유; 油) meaning "oil", mil (밀; 蜜) meaning "honey", and gwa (과; 菓) meaning "confection".

== History ==
Yumil-gwa varieties have commonly been used and consumed for jesa (ancestral rites).

During the Goryeo era (918–1392), yumil-gwa were offered during national feasts, rites, ceremonies, and banquets, including two Buddhist festivals, the Lotus Lantern Festival and the Festival of the Eight Vows. In 1274, yumil-gwa varieties were used for pyebaek (formal greeting) in the wedding ceremony of King Chungnyeol and Princess Jeguk of Yuan China. In 1296, yumil-gwa was brought to the wedding ceremony of the Crown Prince Won (later King Chungseon) and Princess Gyeguk of Yuan, China.

Excessive use of yumil-gwa has led to the introduction of several regulations throughout history. In 1117, King Sukjong issued a restriction on the extravagant usage of yumil-gwa. In 1192, it was commanded that yumil-gwa had to be replaced with fruits. In 1353, a total ban was placed on yumil-gwa. During the Joseon era (1392–1897), the use of yumil-gwa was restricted solely for rites, weddings, and toasts to longevity.

== Preparation and variations ==
Dough for yumil-gwa is made by kneading sifted wheat flour with sesame oil, honey, ginger juice, and cheongju (rice wine). Additional ingredients for filling and garnishing may include cinnamon powder, honey, jujube, and pine nuts. Deep-fried yumil-gwa is soaked in honey or jocheong (rice syrup), and dried.

- Chasu-gwa (차수과; 叉手菓) is a hand-shaped yumil-gwa with five fingers.
- Jungbaekki (중배끼), also called junggye (중계; 中桂), jungbakgye (중박계; 中朴桂), or junggye-gwa (중계과; 中桂菓), are rectangular yumil-gwa that are pan-fried before served.
- Mandu-gwa (만두과; 饅頭菓) is deep-fried sweet dumplings.
- Maejap-gwa (매잡과; 梅雜菓), also called maejak-gwa (매작과; 梅雀菓) or tarae-gwa (타래과), is a ribbon-shaped yumil-gwa.
- Yakgwa (약과; 藥果), also called gwajul (과줄), is flower-shaped yumil-gwa made by molding and deep-frying sweet dough.
- Yohwa-gwa (요화과; 蓼花菓) is a yumil-gwa made into the shape of water-pepper flower.
