= Jeonggwa =

Korean confection

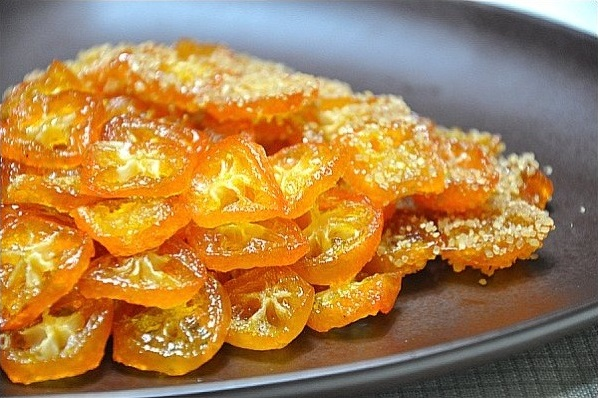
- Geumgyul-jeonggwa (candied kumquat)
- Type: Hangwa
- Place of origin: Korea
- Main ingredients: Edible fruits, roots, or seeds; honey, mullyeot, or sugar

Korean name
- Hangul: 정과
- Hanja: 正果
- RR: jeonggwa
- MR: chŏnggwa
- IPA: [tɕʌŋ.ɡwa]

Jeonggwa (Korean: 정과) is a crispy, chewy hangwa (traditional Korean confection) with vivid colors and a translucent look. It can be made by boiling sliced fruits, roots, or seeds in honey, mullyeot (rice syrup), or sugar water, then drying the slices, and optionally shaping them into flowers or other decorative forms. The candied fruits, roots, or seeds may have the similar texture to jam, marmalade, or jelly.

== Types ==
Common ingredients include yuja, quinces, apricots, lotus roots, radishes, carrots, ginseng, balloon flower roots, gingers, burdock roots, bamboo shoots, and winter melons. If water is boiled first with honey (and often with spices such as cinnamon and ginger) and dried fruit is added later, it is called sujeonggwa (수정과; 水正果; "water jeonggwa") and served cold as a beverage.

=== Miljeonggwa ===
- Aengdu-jeonggwa (앵두정과) – candied Korean cherry
- Boksunga-jeonggwa (복숭아정과) – candied peach
- Cheongmae-jeonggwa (청매정과; 靑梅正果) – candied green Korean plum
- Cheonmundong-jeonggwa (천문동정과; 天門冬正果) – candied Chinese asparagus
- Dallae-jeonggwa (달래정과) – candied Korean wild chive
- Danggeun-jeonggwa (당근정과) – candied carrot
- Deuljjuk-jeonggwa (들쭉정과) – candied bog bilberry
- Donga-jeonggwa (동아정과) – candied winter melon
- Doraji-jeonggwa (도라지정과) – candied balloon flower root
- Gyul-jeonggwa (귤정과) – candied citrus fruit
- Haengin-jeonggwa (행인정과; 杏仁正果) – candied apricot kernel
- Hyangseolgo (향설고; 香雪膏) – candied munbae
- Insam-jeonggwa (인삼정과; 人蔘正果) – candied Korean ginseng
- Juksun-jeonggwa (죽순정과; 竹筍正果) – candied bamboo shoot
- Meoru-jeonggwa (머루정과) – candied crimson grapevine berry
- Mogwa-jeonggwa (모과정과) – candied Chinese quince
- Saenggang-jeonggwa (생강정과; 生薑正果) – candied ginger
- Salgu-jeonggwa (살구정과) – candied apricot
- Yeongeun-jeonggwa (연근정과; 蓮根正果) – candied lotus root
- Yuja-jeonggwa (유자정과; 柚子正果) – candied yuja

=== Sujeonggwa ===
- Sujeonggwa (수정과; 水正果; "cinnamon punch")

== Gallery ==
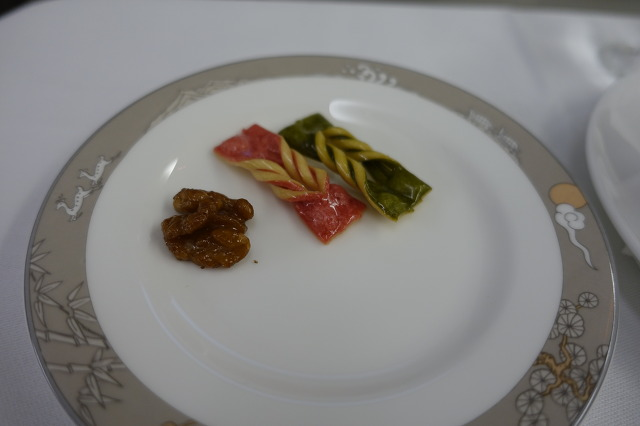
Hodu-jeonggwa (candied walnut) and maejapgwa

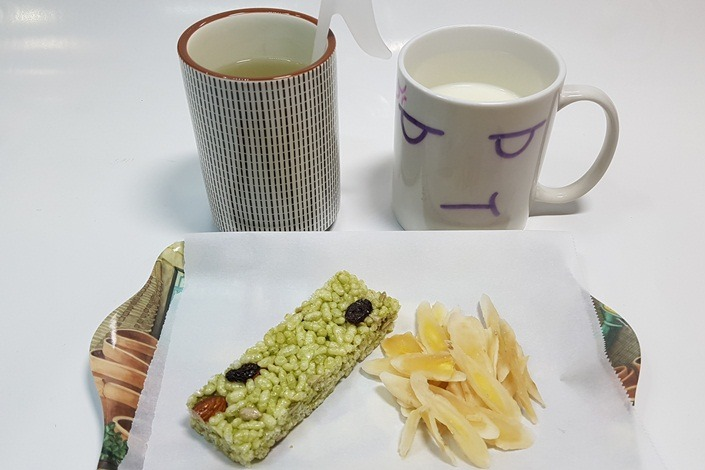
Yeotgangjeong and saenggang-jeonggwa (candied ginger)

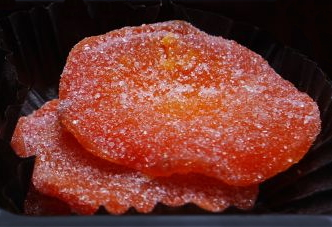
Danggeun-jeonggwa (candied carrot)

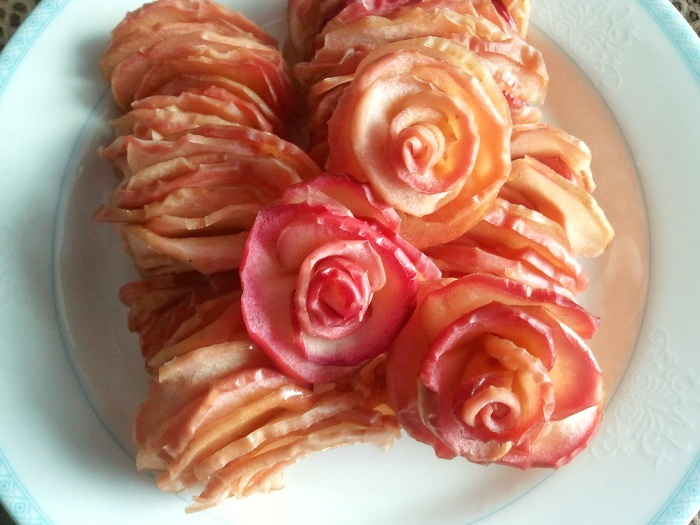
Sagwa-jeonggwa (candied apple)

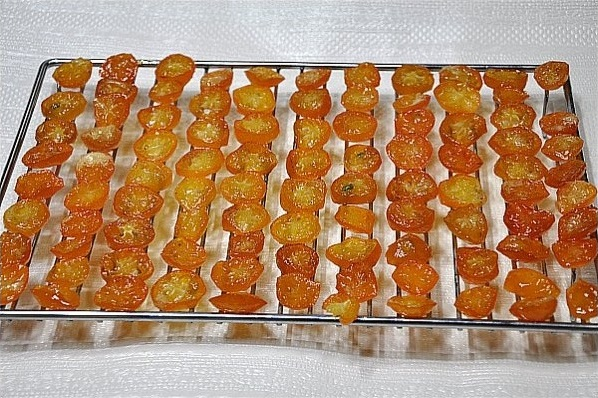
Drying geumgyul-jeonggwa (candied kumquat) on a drying rack

== See also ==
- Gwapyeon
- Suksilgwa
