= Platycodin D =

Names
- IUPAC name 3-C-(Hydroxymethyl)-β-D-erythrofuranosyl-(1→3)-β-D-xylopyranosyl-(1→4)-α-L-rhamnopyranosyl-(1→2)-α-L-arabinopyranosyl 3β-(β-D-glucopyranosyloxy)-2β,16α,23,24-hydroxyolean-12-en-28-oate
- Systematic IUPAC name (1^{2}S,1^{3}R,1^{4}S,1^{5}S,3^{2}S,3^{3}R,3^{4}S,3^{5}R,3^{6}S,5^{2}S,5^{3}R,5^{4}S,5^{5}R,7^{2}S,7^{3}R,7^{4}R)-1^{4},1^{5},3^{3},3^{4},5^{3},5^{5},7^{3},7^{4}-Octahydroxy-7^{4}-(hydroxymethyl)-3^{6}-methyl-2,4,6-trioxa-1(3),3(2,5),5(2,4)-tris(oxana)-7(2)-oxolanaheptaphan-1^{2}-yl (4aR,5R,6aS,6bR,8aR,10R,11S,12aR,12bR,14bS)-5,11-dihydroxy-9,9-bis(hydroxymethyl)-2,2,6a,6b,12a-pentamethyl-10-{[(2R,3R,4S,5S,6R)-3,4,5-trihydroxy-6-(hydroxymethyl)oxan-2-yl]oxy}-1,3,4,5,6,6a,6b,7,8,8a,9,10,11,12,12a,12b,13,14b-octadecahydropicene-4a(2H)-carboxylate

Identifiers
CAS Number	58479-68-8
3D model (JSmol)	Interactive image
ChEBI	CHEBI:70436
ChEMBL	ChEMBL1641859
ChemSpider	58824349
ECHA InfoCard	100.208.719
EC Number	683-210-0
KEGG	C17410
PubChem CID	162859
UNII	CWJ06TA2GI
CompTox Dashboard (EPA)	DTXSID901021773
- InChI: InChI=1S/C57H92O28/c1-23-40(81-45-39(72)41(28(64)18-76-45)82-49-43(73)56(75,21-61)22-78-49)36(69)38(71)46(79-23)83-42-33(66)27(63)17-77-48(42)85-50(74)57-12-11-51(2,3)13-25(57)24-7-8-30-52(4)14-26(62)44(84-47-37(70)35(68)34(67)29(16-58)80-47)55(19-59,20-60)31(52)9-10-53(30,5)54(24,6)15-32(57)65/h7,23,25-49,58-73,75H,8-22H2,1-6H3/t23-,25-,26-,27-,28+,29+,30+,31+,32+,33-,34+,35-,36-,37+,38+,39+,40-,41-,42+,43-,44-,45-,46-,47-,48-,49-,52+,53+,54+,56+,57+/m0/s1 Key: CYBWUNOAQPMRBA-NDTOZIJESA-N
- SMILES: C[C@H]1[C@@H]([C@H]([C@H]([C@@H](O1)O[C@@H]2[C@H]([C@H](CO[C@H]2OC(=O)[C@]34CCC(C[C@H]3C5=CC[C@H]6[C@]([C@@]5(C[C@H]4O)C)(CC[C@@H]7[C@@]6(C[C@@H]([C@@H](C7(CO)CO)O[C@H]8[C@@H]([C@H]([C@@H]([C@H](O8)CO)O)O)O)O)C)C)(C)C)O)O)O)O)O[C@H]9[C@@H]([C@H]([C@@H](CO9)O)O[C@H]1[C@@H]([C@](CO1)(CO)O)O)O

Properties
Chemical formula	C_{57}H_{92}O_{28}
Molar mass	1225.335 g·mol^{−1}

Hazards
- GHS labelling
Pictograms	(GHS07: Exclamation mark)
Signal word	Warning
Hazard statements	H302
Precautionary statements	P264, P270, P301+P312, P330, P501
- Except where otherwise noted, data are given for materials in their standard state (at 25 °C [77 °F], 100 kPa). Infobox references

Platycodin D is a chemical compound extracted from the roots of Platycodon grandiflorus. It has been studied in vitro for potential spermicidal and antiinflammatory effects.
