= Gangjeong =

Korean confection

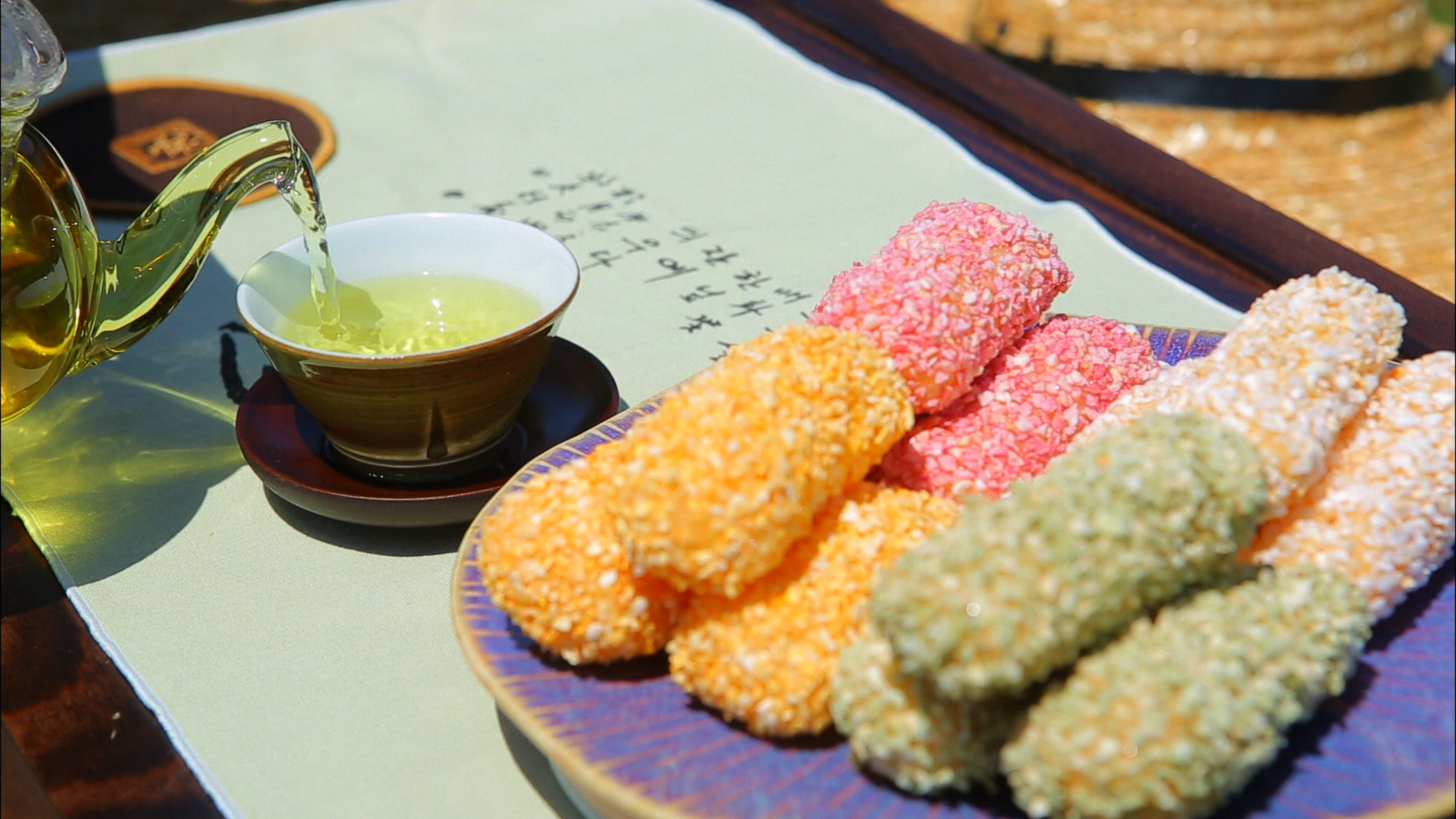
- Colorful gangjeong
- Type: Yugwa
- Place of origin: Korea
- Main ingredients: Glutinous rice flour; cheongju (rice wine); cooking oil; honey; beans, nuts, seeds, pollen, or spice powders

Korean name
- Hangul: 강정
- RR: gangjeong
- MR: kangjŏng
- IPA: kaŋ.dʑʌŋ

Gangjeong (Korean: 강정) is a hangwa (a traditional Korean confection) made with glutinous rice flour. It is a deep-fried "rice puff" with hollow inside, coated with honey followed by nutty beans, nuts, seeds, pollen, or spice powders. Gangjeong is often served during important events such as weddings, ancestral rites, and Korean New Year celebrations. Yugwa was widely distributed after the Goryeo dynasty due to the influence of Buddhism, and was called "Goryeo dessert" in the Yuan dynasty of China.

== Preparation ==
Glutinous rice is soaked in water for four to five days, then pounded or ground into fine powder. Ten cups of glutinous rice flour is mixed with one-half cup cheongju (rice wine) and one-half cup honey, then steamed in a siru (steamer) lined with a wet bojagi (cloth). The steamed dough is kneaded, rolled into 1 centimetre (0.39 in) thick sheets, cut into rectangles 3–4 centimetres (1.2–1.6 in) long and 1.5–2 centimetres (0.59–0.79 in) wide, and dried in the shade. The well-dried gangjeong is first soaked in room-temperature cooking oil, then left to rise a little more in warm oil before it is deep-fried at a high temperature. Regarding the taste of Gangjeong in the 閨閤叢 Book of Kyuhap, It said, "I was surprised that Gangjeong chewed and flew away." As the saying goes, Gangjeong is better expanded and fried to the bottom. When all excess oil is drained, the rice puff is coated with honey, followed by nutty grains or powders such as toasted sesame seeds, pine nut powder, soybean powder, pine pollen, Angelica leaf powder, and cinnamon powder.

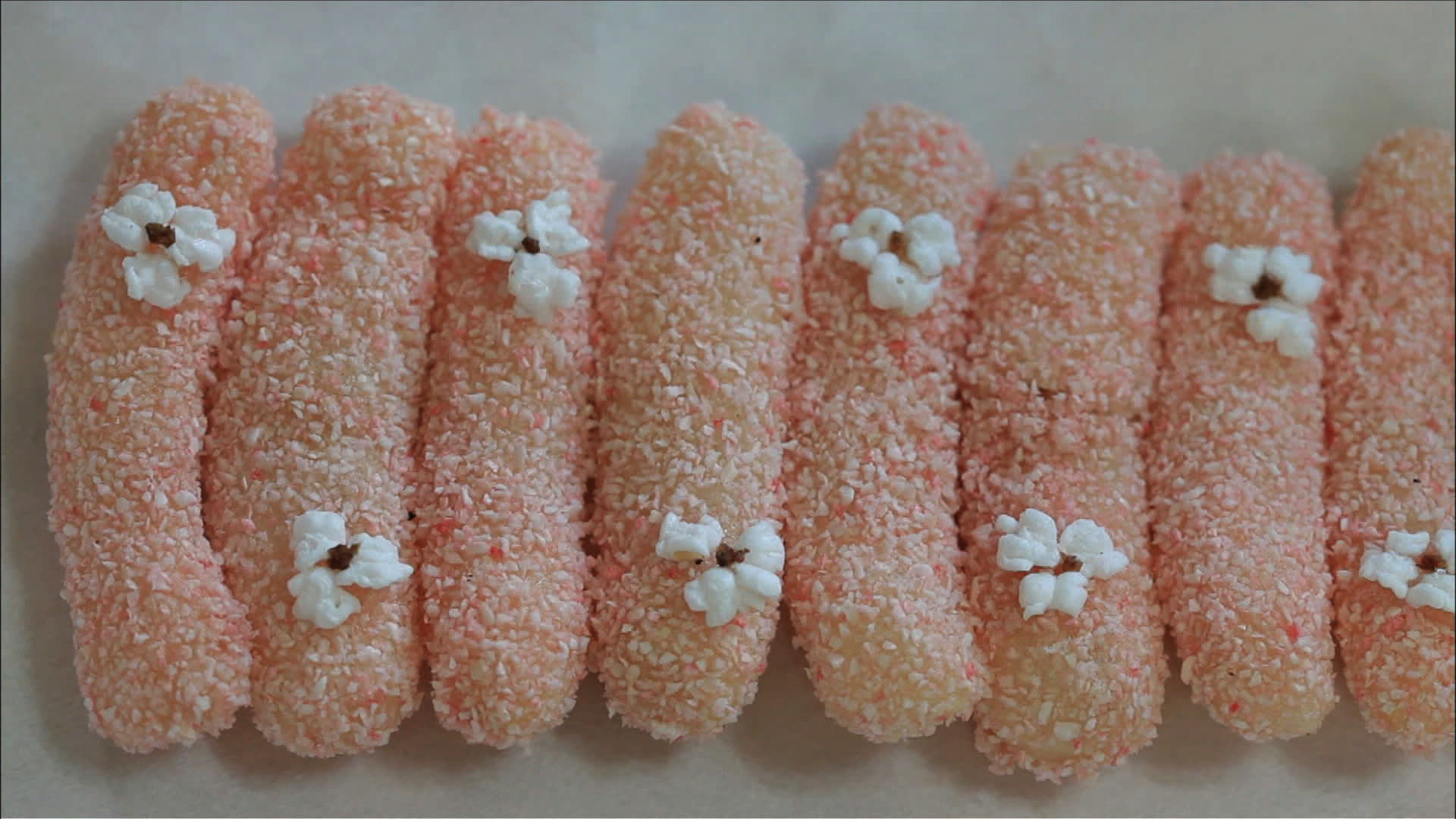
Pink gangjeong

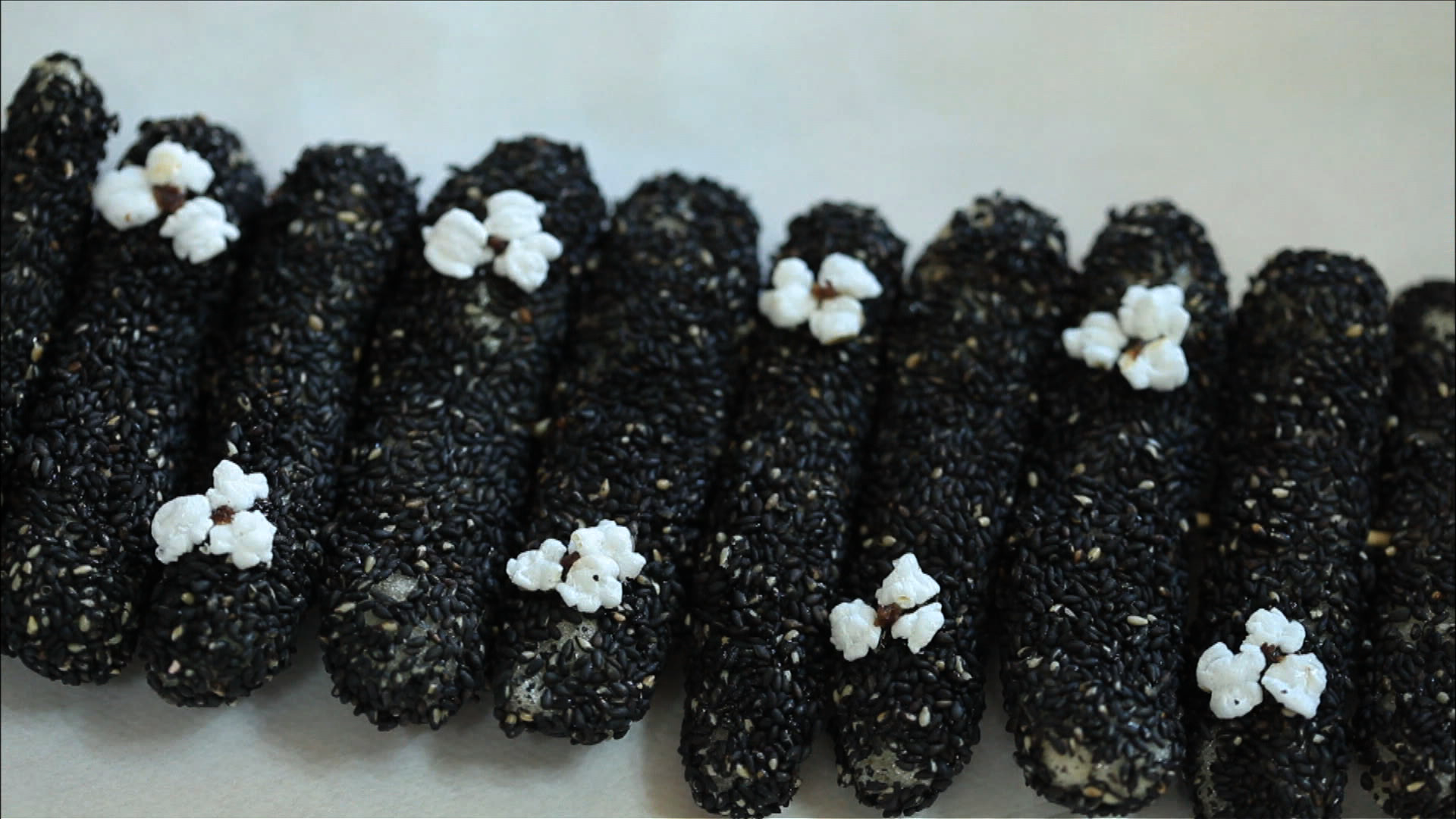
Black sesame gangjeong

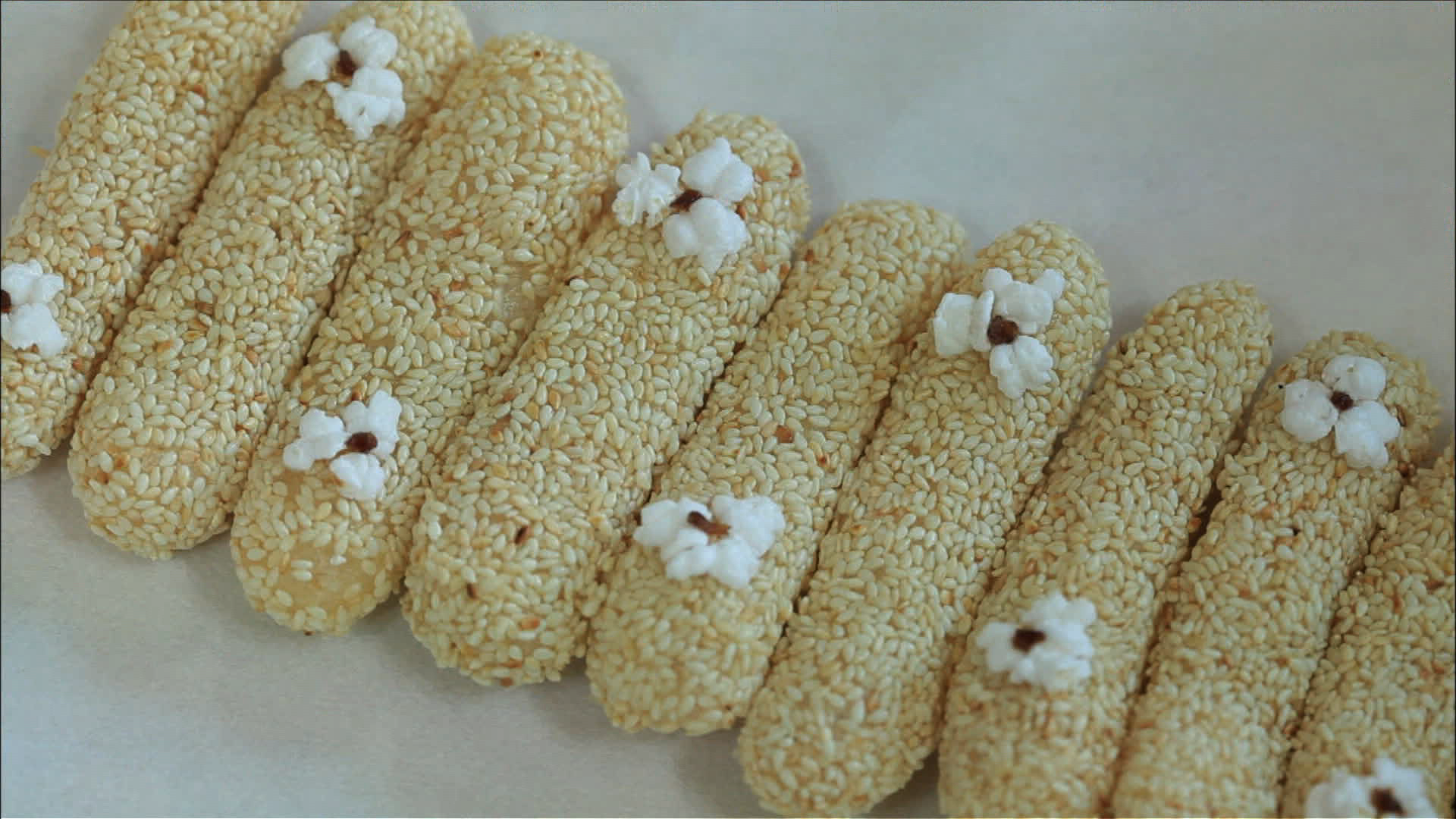
White sesame gangjeong

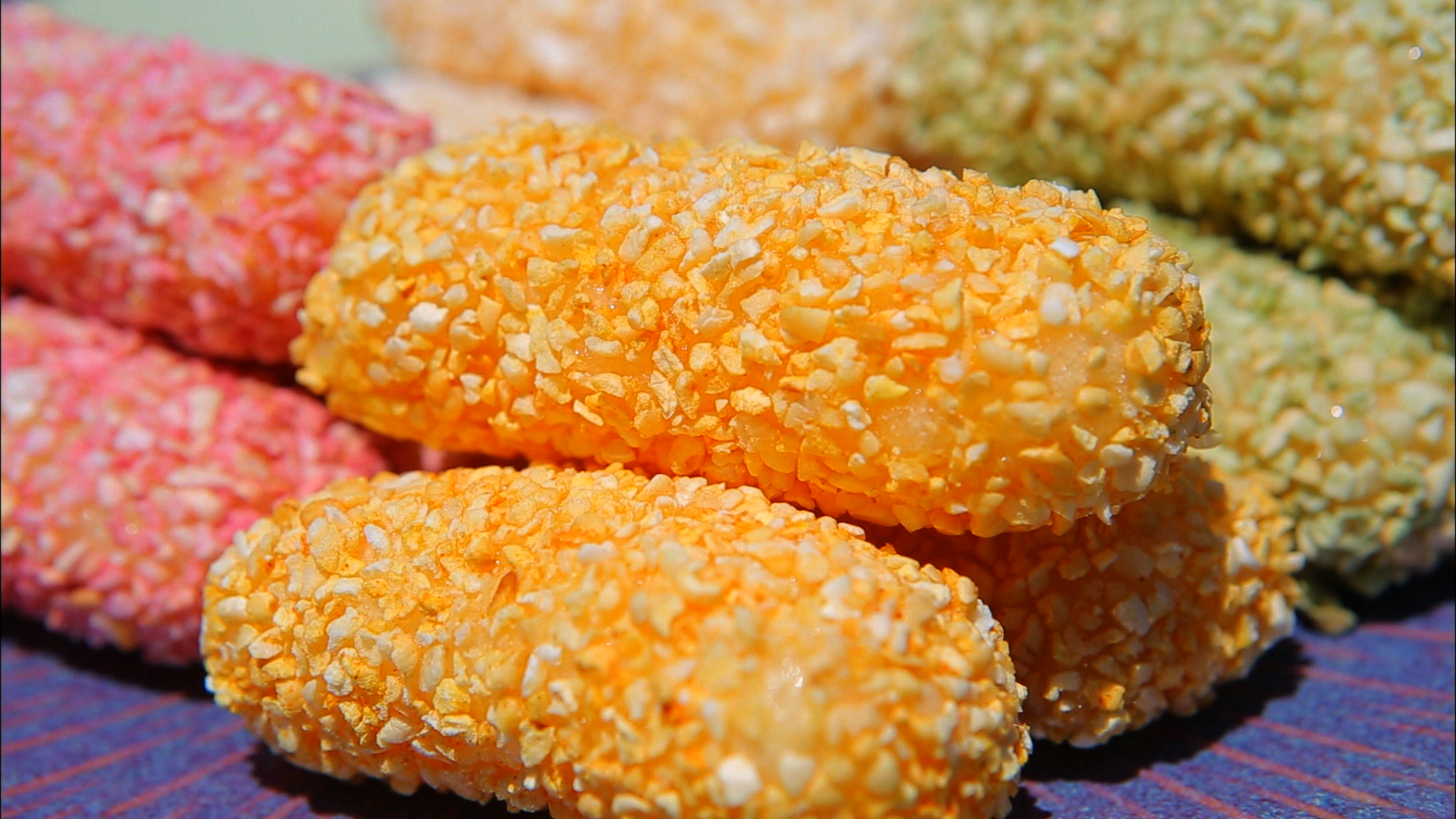
Gangjeong of many colors

== History ==
Its origin goes back to the time of the Han dynasty. At that time, there was a food called hangu (寒具), a kind of snack that was eaten as an appetizer before breakfast in the Han dynasty. It is a food that is mixed with glutinous rice flour, kneaded, and then fried into certain shapes, and dipped in honey or starch syrup. There is a theory that Gangjeong was widely spread under the name "Yumilgwa" during the Goryeo dynasty. However, during the Three Kingdoms period, there is also a description of an object presumed to be Gangjeong because it is called "gwa (餜)" in Gaya. Gangjeong in Korea comes in the form of 'pre-seasoned' rather than 'dipping the seasoning' like in Hangu.Gangjeong itself has a variety of ingredients, so it is called black sesame gangjeong, sesame gangjeong, cinnamon gangjeong, and pine nut gangjeong depending on the ingredients used as a kind of junk. In today's world, it belongs to snacks and is handled in practice, but Gangjeong has long been ruled as the exclusive property of the yangban class because the process of making it takes a long time, it is complicated, and the ingredients are as enormous as the old era standard. Ordinary people watch Gangjeong only when the yangban is generous and gives it away, or when the village slope makes a feast. Gangjeong was also exclusive to those above the yangban class because this is rarely the case. In addition, most of the above-mentioned generous yangban were often distributed to servants and slaves under them, and except when working under the yangban, it was less common for commoners to watch Gangjeong than for slaves who met their owners well, who could be obtained during holidays or rituals.

== See also ==
- Yugwa
- Yeotgangjeong

Hangaone(Hangwa Culture Museum)
