= Hangwa =

Term for Korean confectionery

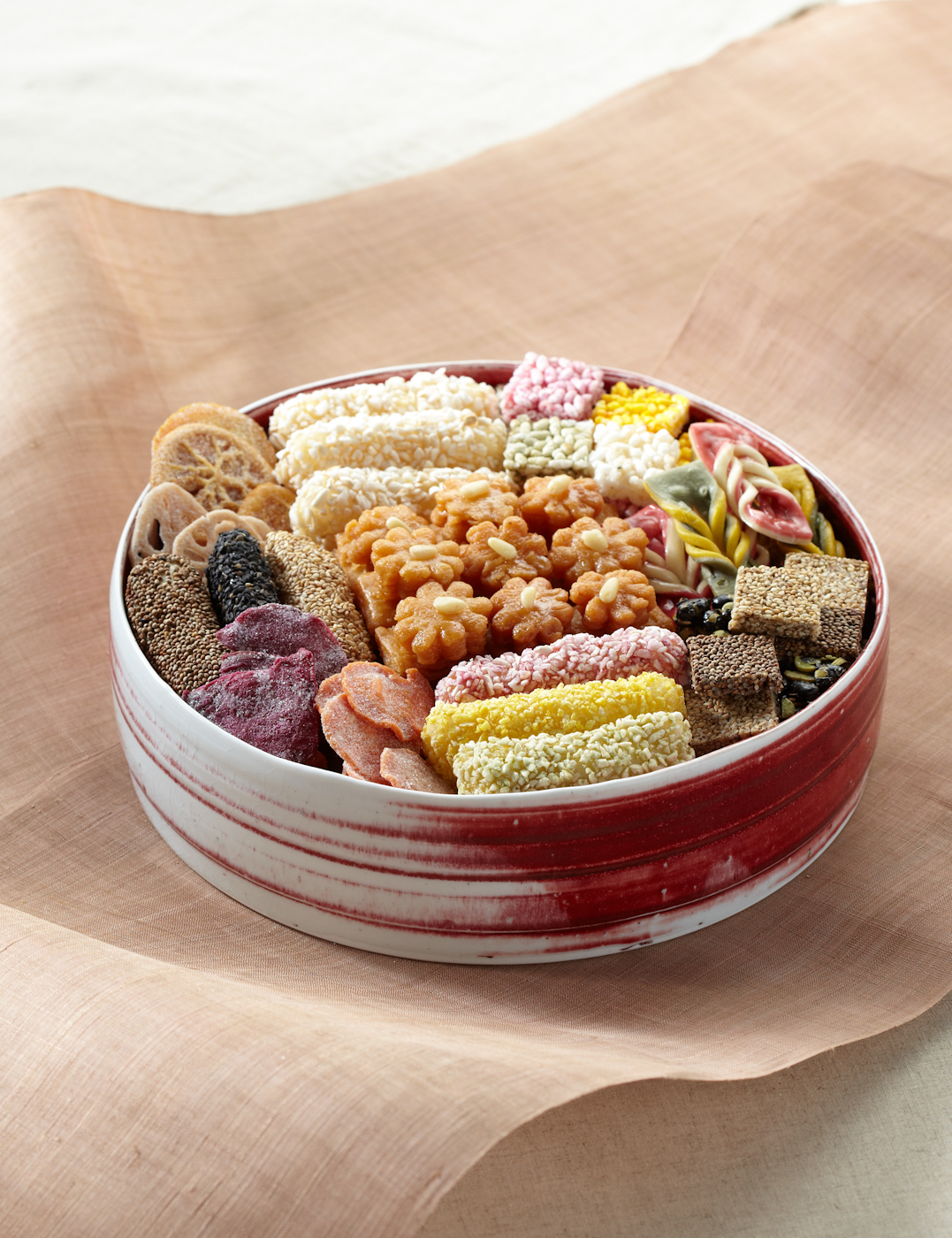
- Various hangwa
- Type: Confectionery
- Place of origin: Korea
- Associated cuisine: Korean cuisine

Korean name
- Hangul: 한과
- Hanja: 韓菓
- RR: hangwa
- MR: han'gwa
- IPA: [han.ɡwa]

Other names
- Hangul: 조과; 과정류
- Hanja: 造果; 果飣類
- RR: jogwa; gwajeongnyu
- MR: chogwa; kwajŏngnyu
- IPA: [tɕo.ɡwa]; [kwa.dʑʌŋ.nju]

Hangwa (Korean: 한과) is a general term for traditional Korean confections. With tteok (rice cakes), hangwa forms the sweet food category in Korean cuisine. Common ingredients of hangwa include grain flour, fruits and roots, sweet ingredients such as honey and yeot, and spices such as cinnamon and ginger.

== Names ==
Hangwa (한과; 韓菓) translates to "Korean confectionery" referring to traditional confections contrasting with yanggwa (양과; 洋菓), which identifies "Western confectionery". In the past hangwa was called jogwa (조과; 造果) which means "artificial fruit" or gwajeongnyu (과정류; 果飣類) as meaning "fruit food category".

== History ==
The history of hangwa goes back to the era of the three kingdoms (57 BCE ‒ 668 CE), when various types of confections were consumed by royals during festivities, national holidays or in court, according to the Memorabilia of the Three Kingdoms.

Following the two Buddhist dynasties, Unified Silla in the era of two kingdoms (698–926) and Goryeo (936‒1392), the cultivation of crops and consumption of confections increased drastically as the Buddhist diets forbade meat. Confections were offered in Goryeo's national feasts, rites, ceremonies, and banquets, including the two Buddhist festivals, the Lotus Lantern Festival and the Festival of the Eight Vows. Prevailing tea ceremonies also required more types of confections.

Concerns regarding the increasingly excessive consumption of confections that have large amounts of oil, grain, and honey have consequently lead to several regulations throughout the course of its history. In 1117, King Sukjong restricted the extravagant usage of deep-fried grain confections. In 1192, deep-fried grain confections were mandated to be replaced with fruits and in 1353, a total ban on deep-fried grain confections was issued.

Restrictions continued in the Joseon Dynasty (1392‒1897), according to Comprehensive Collection of the National Codes that recorded that the use of deep-fried grain confections was restricted solely for rites, weddings, and toasts to longevity. Commoners caught eating them on occasions other than that were subjected to monetary fines or corporal punishment.

== Categories ==
Hangwa can be classified into eight main categories, namely dasik (tea food), gwapyeon (fruit jelly), jeonggwa (fruit jerky), suksil-gwa, yeot-gangjeong, yugwa, yumil-gwa, and candies.

- Candies – Traditional Korean candies can be eaten as they are, or used as sweetening ingredients in other types of hangwa. Dang (당; 糖; "candy") or Dangryu (당류; 糖類; "candy category") refers to hard and sweet confection. It can be made of crystallized sugar, or saccharified starch. Yeot is a traditional sweet in either liquid or solid form, as a syrup, taffy, or candy. It is made with grains such rice, glutinous rice, glutinous sorghum, corn, sweet potatoes, by saccharifying them using barley malt.
- Dasik, literally "tea food", is a bite-size sweet that is normally accompanied by tea. It is made by pressing honeyed powder into a decorative mold. Typical ingredients include rice flour, pine pollen, black sesame, chestnut, and soybean.
- Gwapyeon is a jelly-like summer dessert made with a variety of fruits, such as berries, cherries, and apricots. It is made by mixing fruit juice with starch and agar to attain a gelatinous consistency.
- Jeonggwa is a crispy, chewy sweet made of candied fruits, roots, or seeds. Common ingredients include yuja, quince, apricot, lotus root, radish, carrot, ginseng, balloon flower root, ginger, burdock root, bamboo shoot, and winter melon.
- Suksil-gwa, literally "cooked fruit", consists of fruit, roots, or seeds cooked and sweetened with honey. Common ingredients include chestnut, jujube, and ginger. Suksil-gwa is similar to—and sometimes classified as—jeonggwa, but has unique characteristics that differentiate it from the jeonggwa category.
- Yeot-gangjeong is made by mixing toasted seeds, nuts, beans, or popped grains with rice syrup and then cutting it into desired shapes. Common ingredients are pine nuts, walnuts, peanuts, sesame or perilla seeds, and popped rice.
- Yugwa is a deep-fried confection made with glutinous rice flour dough. It can be classified into gangjeong, sanja, and hangwa depending on its shape and size.
- Yumil-gwa refers to a deep-fried confection made of wheat flour dough. It may be made of various ingredients such as honey, cooking oil, cinnamon powder, nuts and cheongju (rice wine). It may be classified as mandu-gwa (dumplings), maejap-gwa (ribbons), or yakgwa (flower) according to the cooking methods.

Other hangwa varieties include:

- Gotgam-mari is a roll made of dried persimmons and walnuts. It can be made by rolling a toasted and peeled walnut with a dried, deseeded, and flattened persimmon, then slicing each roll like slicing a gimbap.
- Yaksik, also called yakbap, is a sweet rice dessert made with steamed glutinous rice mixed with honey, soy sauce, jujubes, chestnuts, pine nuts, and sesame oil.

== Occasions ==
Traditionally, hangwa was offered during jesa (ancestral rites), chuseok (harvest festival), weddings or hwangap (sixtieth-birthday) celebrations. Today hangwa can be purchased online, in markets, coffee shops or at tea houses.

== Modern times ==
In the 1900s, hangwa began to fall out of favor with the introduction of sugar and western confection. In recent years, it has seen a revitalization and is associated with holiday food. With the rising demand for hangwa, this market has seen increased support from the Ministry of Agriculture, Forestry, and Fishery. Today, it is offered as ceremonial food and is often gifted especially during seollal (Korean New Years). As society has sought healthier alternatives in consumable goods, efforts to produce confections to stimulate wellness began. Healthier hangwa was created by adding ginseng, green tea, and laver.

== See also ==
- Chinese desserts – Chinese confections
- Wagashi – Japanese confections
- List of Korean desserts
