= Suksil-gwa =

Korean cooked fruit dish

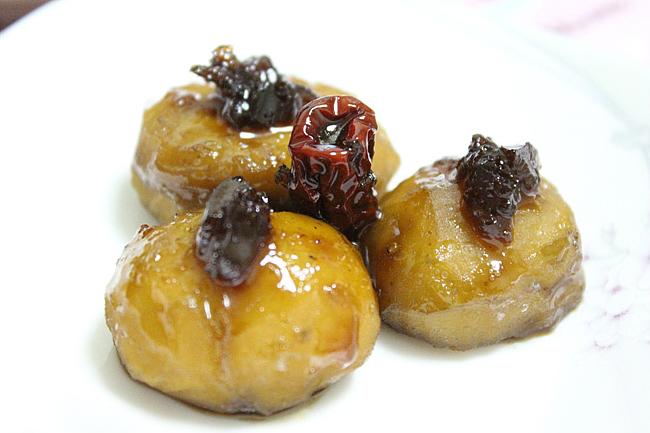
- Type: Hangwa
- Place of origin: Korea
- Associated cuisine: Korean cuisine
- Main ingredients: Chestnuts, jujube, ginger
- Ingredients generally used: Honey, cinnamon powder, pine nuts

Korean name
- Hangul: 숙실과
- Hanja: 熟實果
- RR: suksilgwa
- MR: suksilgwa
- IPA: [suk̚.ɕ͈il.ɡwa]

Suksil-gwa (Korean: 숙실과; Hanja: 熟實果), literally "cooked fruit", is a category of hangwa (Korean confection) consisting of cooked fruit, roots, or seeds sweetened with honey. Common ingredients include chestnut, jujube, and ginger. Suksil-gwa is similar to—and sometimes classified as—jeonggwa, but has unique characteristics that differentiate it from the jeonggwa category.

It has been mainly used for special occasions such as janchi (banquet), or jesa (ancestral rite). During the Joseon era (1392–1897), it was consumed by yangban (scholar-officials) and in royal court cuisine, due to the requirement for good quality fruit and an elaborate cooking process. Suksil-gwa is usually served with two or three kinds in one dish.

== Varieties ==
Suksil-gwa can be divided into ran-type and cho-type by the cooking method. Each of the terms is affixed to the main ingredient. The ran-type involves meshing of the cooked ingredient, mixing them with honey, and shaping the mixture into the shape of the fruit. The cho-type are made without the meshing process.

- Yullan (율란; 栗卵) – made by mashing and sieving boiled and peeled chestnuts, mixing the sieved chestnut with cinnamon powder and honey into a dough, then shaping the dough into chestnut-shaped confection and garnishing it with pine nut powder.
- Joran (조란; 棗卵) – made by mashing and sieving boiled and deseeded jujube, mixing the sieved jujube with cinnamon powder and honey into a dough, then shaping the dough into jujube-shaped confection and optionally garnishing it with pine nut powder. Sometimes, joran can be filled with the mixture of chestnut powder and honey.
- Saengnan (생란; 生卵) – also referred to as gangnan (강란; 薑卵) or saenggang-ran (생강란; 生薑卵), made by boiling peeled and finely minced ginger in a lot of water to reduce the heat, sieving it, simmering it in honey, cooling it, and shaping it into ginger-shaped confection and garnishing it with pine nut powder.
- Bamcho (밤초) – also referred to as yulcho (율초; 栗炒), made by simmering peeled chestnuts in water, with honey of the same weight as chestnuts added. When the honey penetrates the chestnuts, cinnamon powder is added and the confection is drained and coated with pine nut powder. Both dried and fresh chestnuts can be used to make bamcho.
- Daechu-cho (대추초) – made by deseeding jujube, steaming it for a short time and stuffing it with around two pine nuts, simmering the stuffed jujube with honey and cinnamon powder, and coating it with pine nut powder. When served, daechu-cho is garnished with a toasted pine nut on the stalk end of the jujube.

== See also ==
- Gwapyeon
- Jeonggwa
