= Yeot-gangjeong =

Korean dessert

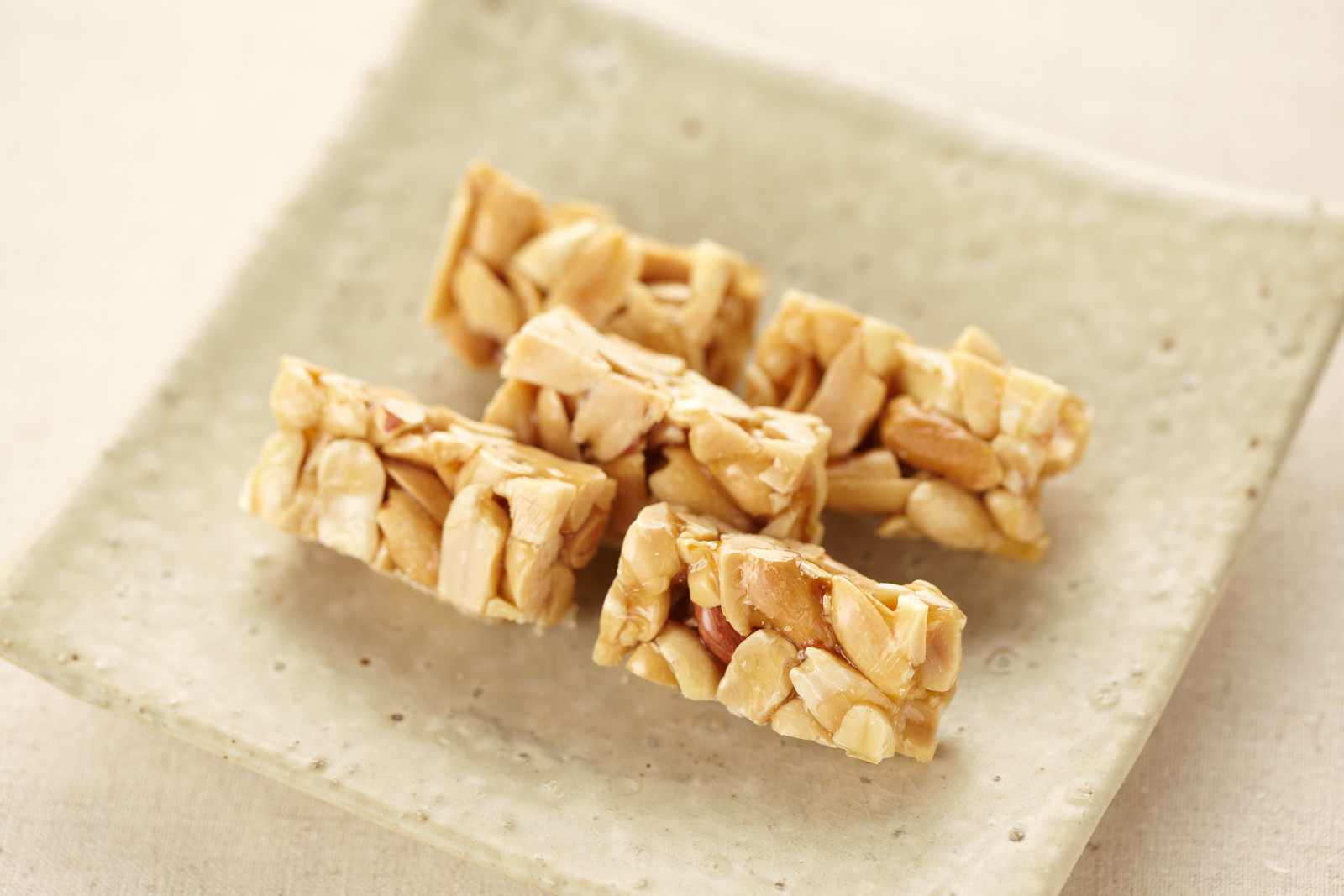
- Ttangkong-yeot-gangjeong (peanut candy bar)
- Type: Hangwa; Candy bar
- Place of origin: Korea
- Associated cuisine: Korean cuisine
- Main ingredients: Toasted seeds, nuts, beans, or puffed grains; mullyeot (rice syrup)

Korean name
- Hangul: 엿강정
- RR: yeotgangjeong
- MR: yŏtkangjŏng
- IPA: [jʌt̚.k͈aŋ.dʑʌŋ]

Yeot-gangjeong (엿강정) is a candy bar-like variety of hangwa (traditional Korean confection) consisting of toasted seeds, nuts, beans, or puffed grains mixed with mullyeot (rice syrup). In general households, they usually make and eat yeot-gangjeong during Korean holidays and Jesa. Or, it is made and sold as a winter snack and is usually eaten during holidays and feasts.

== Gallery ==
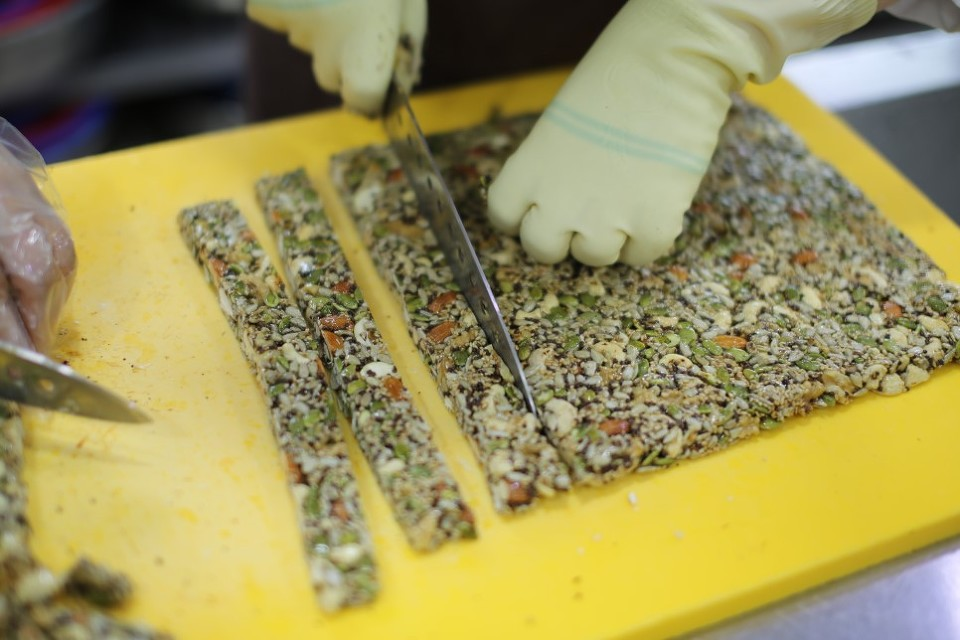
Cutting yeot-gangjeong

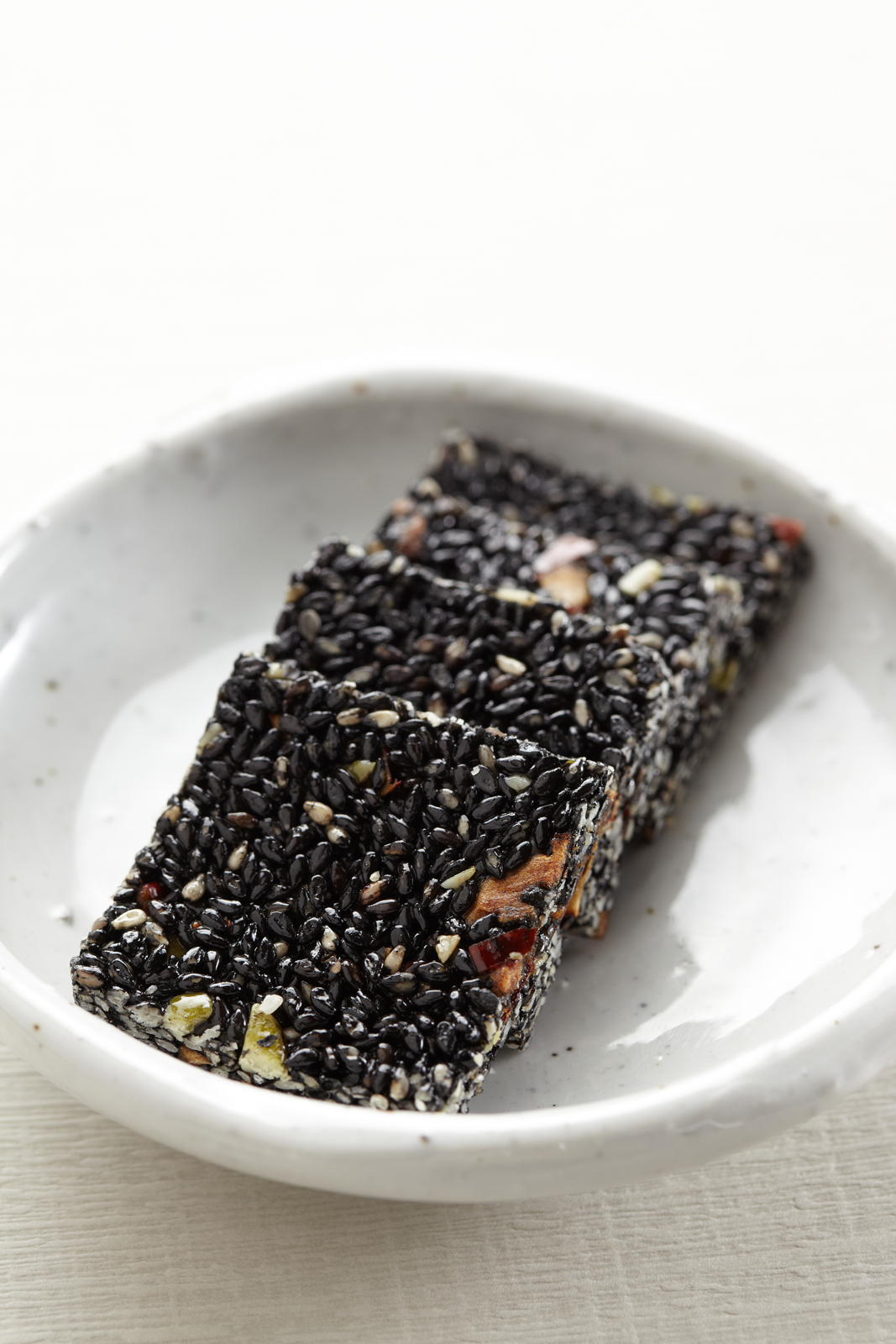
Black sesame yeot-gangjeong

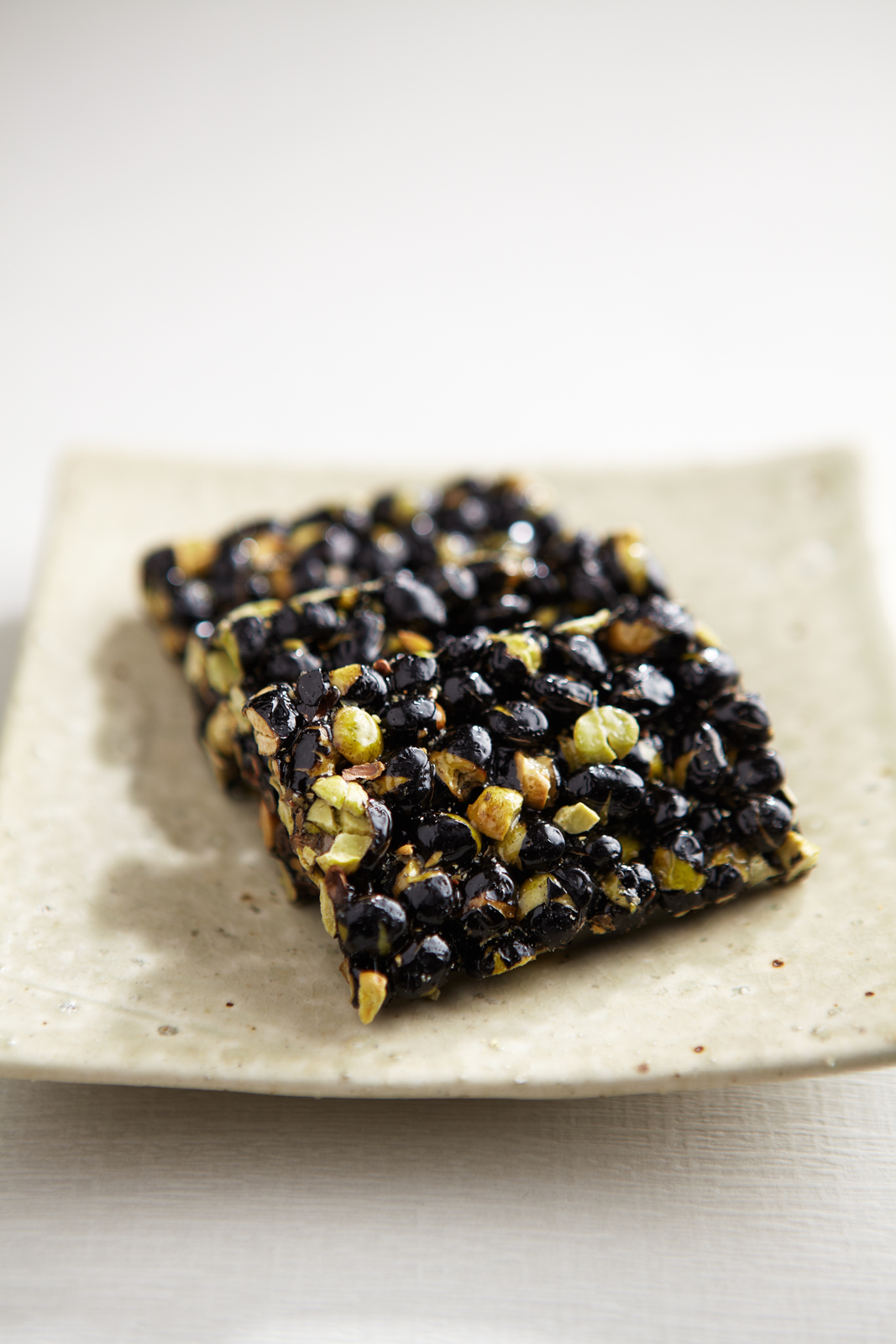
Black soybean yeot-gangjeong

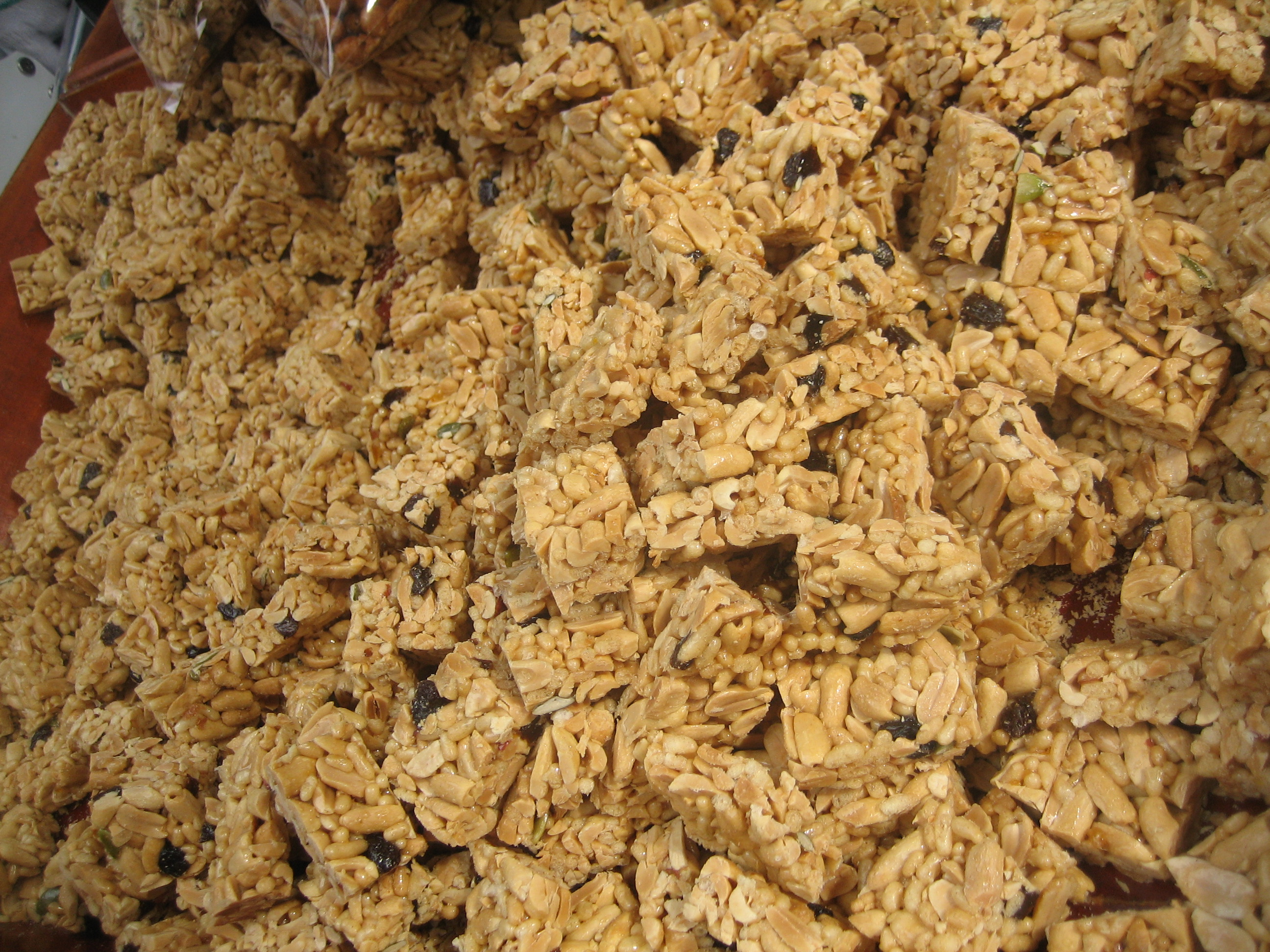
Peanut, puffed rice, and raisin yeot-gangjeong

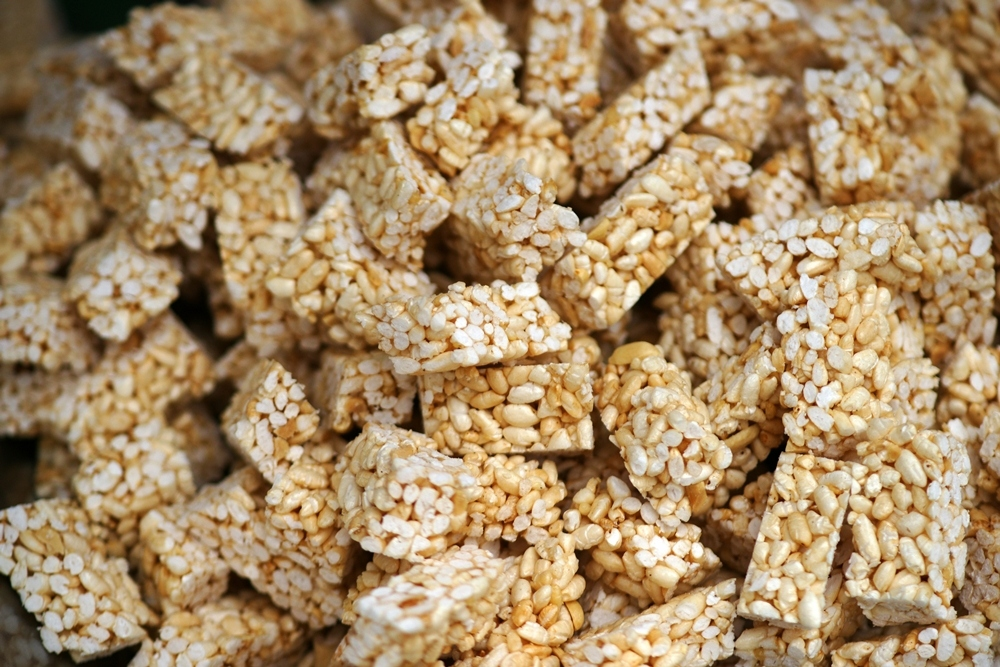
Puffed rice yeot-gangjeong

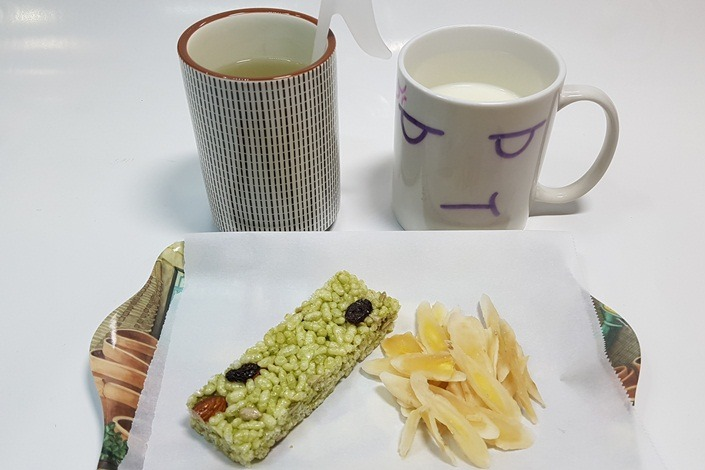
Puffed rice and raisin yeot-gangjeong

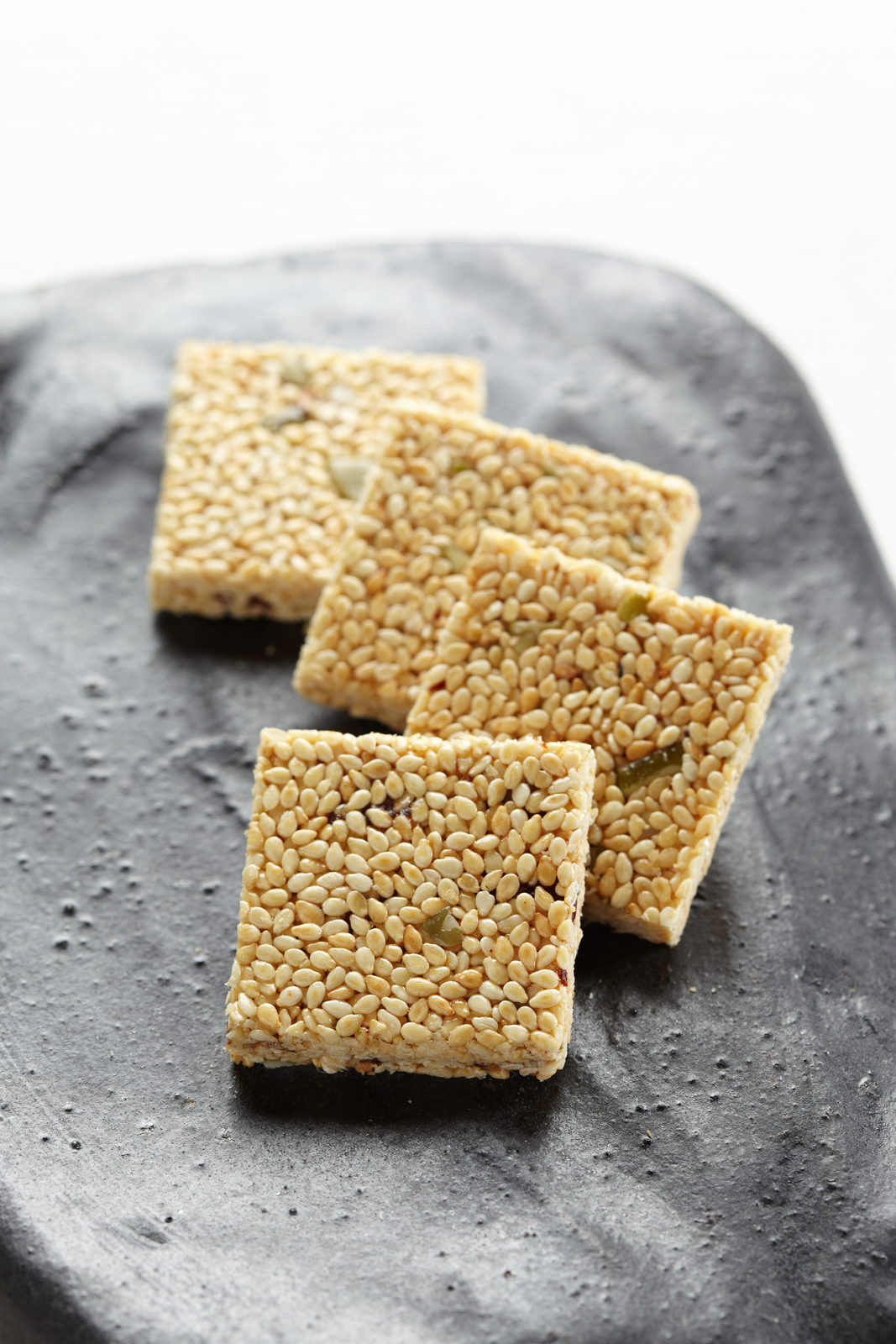
Sesame yeot-gangjeong

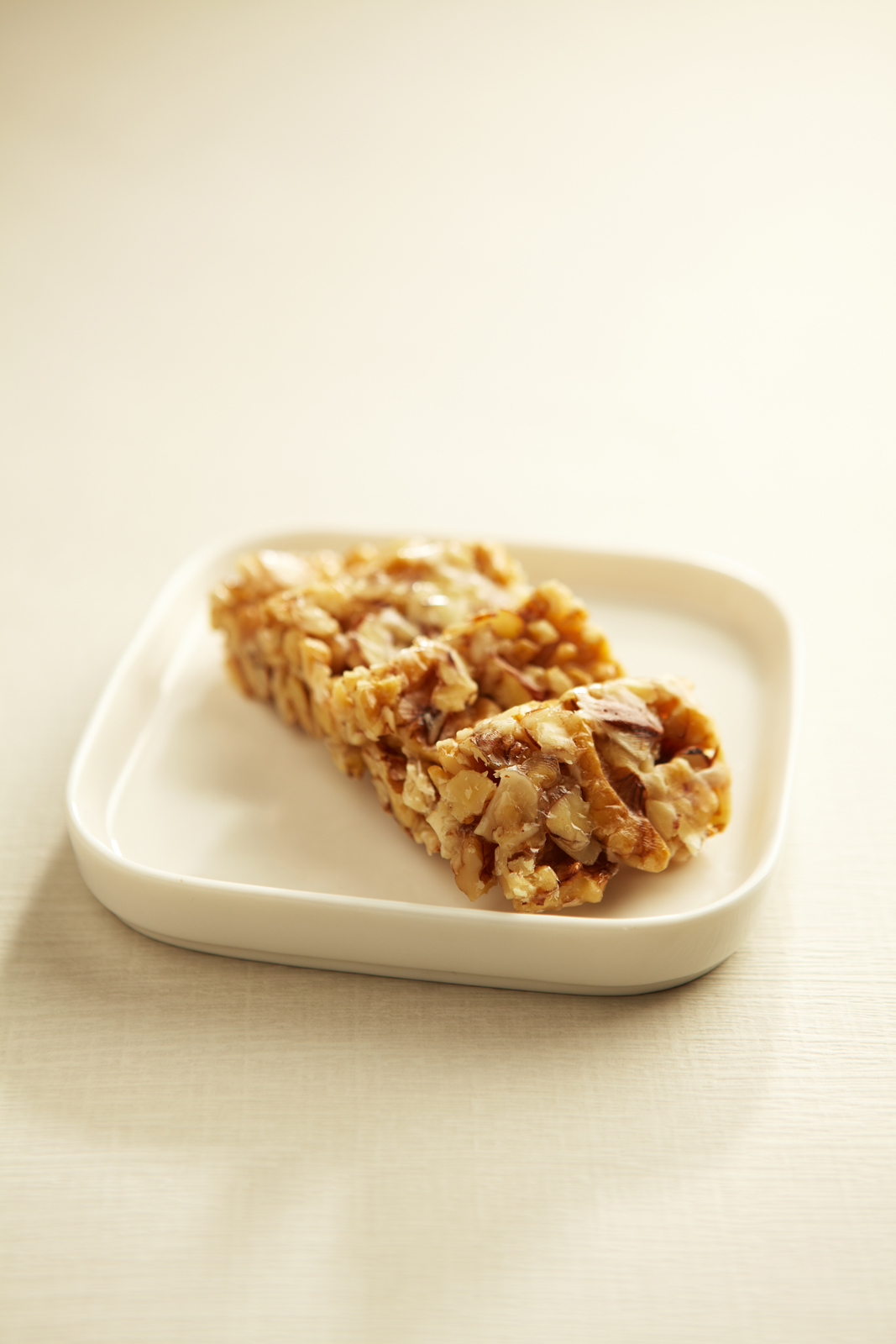
Walnut yeot-gangjeong

== See also ==
- Candy bar
- Dessert bar
- Chikki
- Gozinaki
- Sachima
