= Yeot =

Traditional Korean confectionary

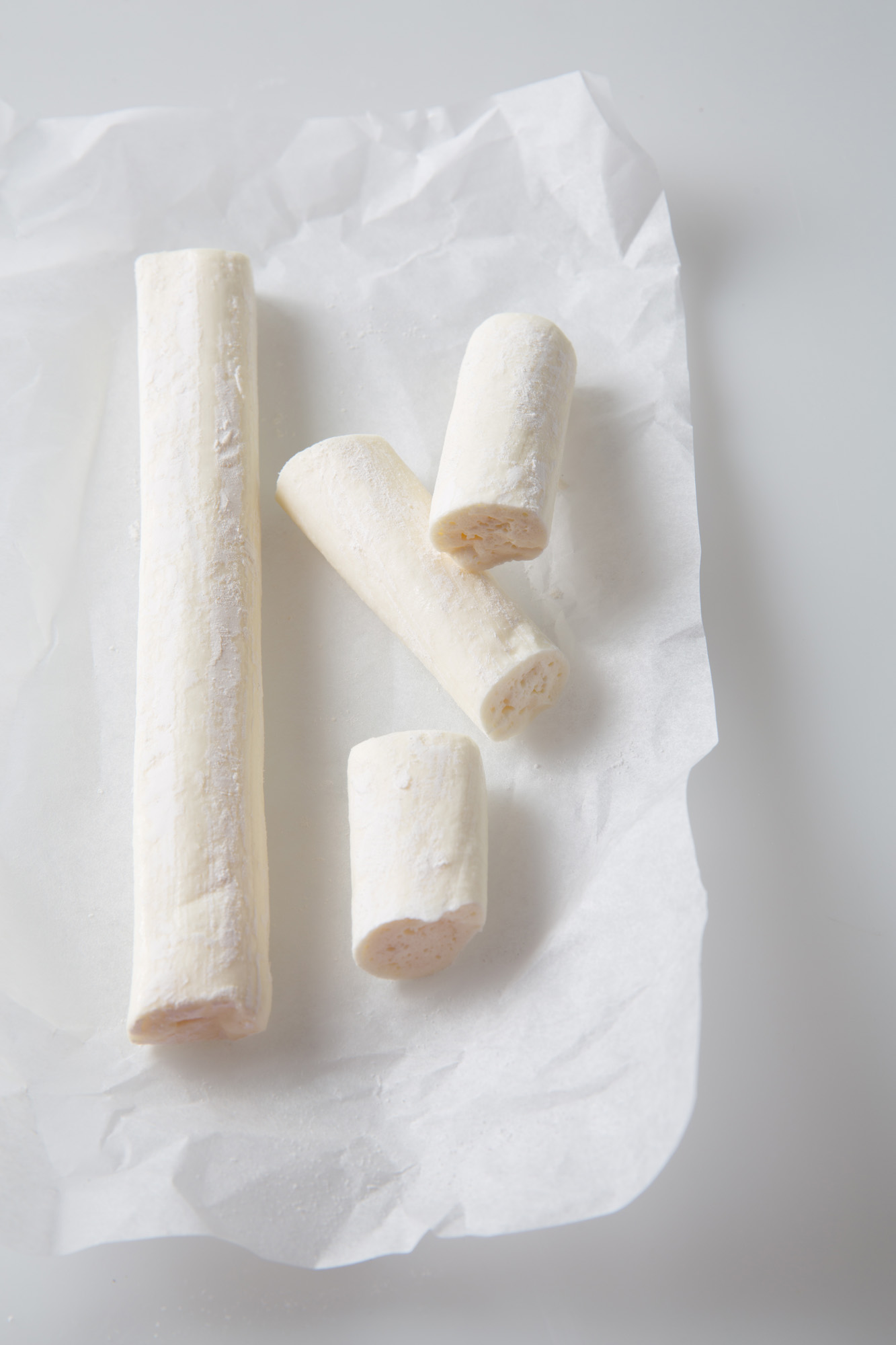
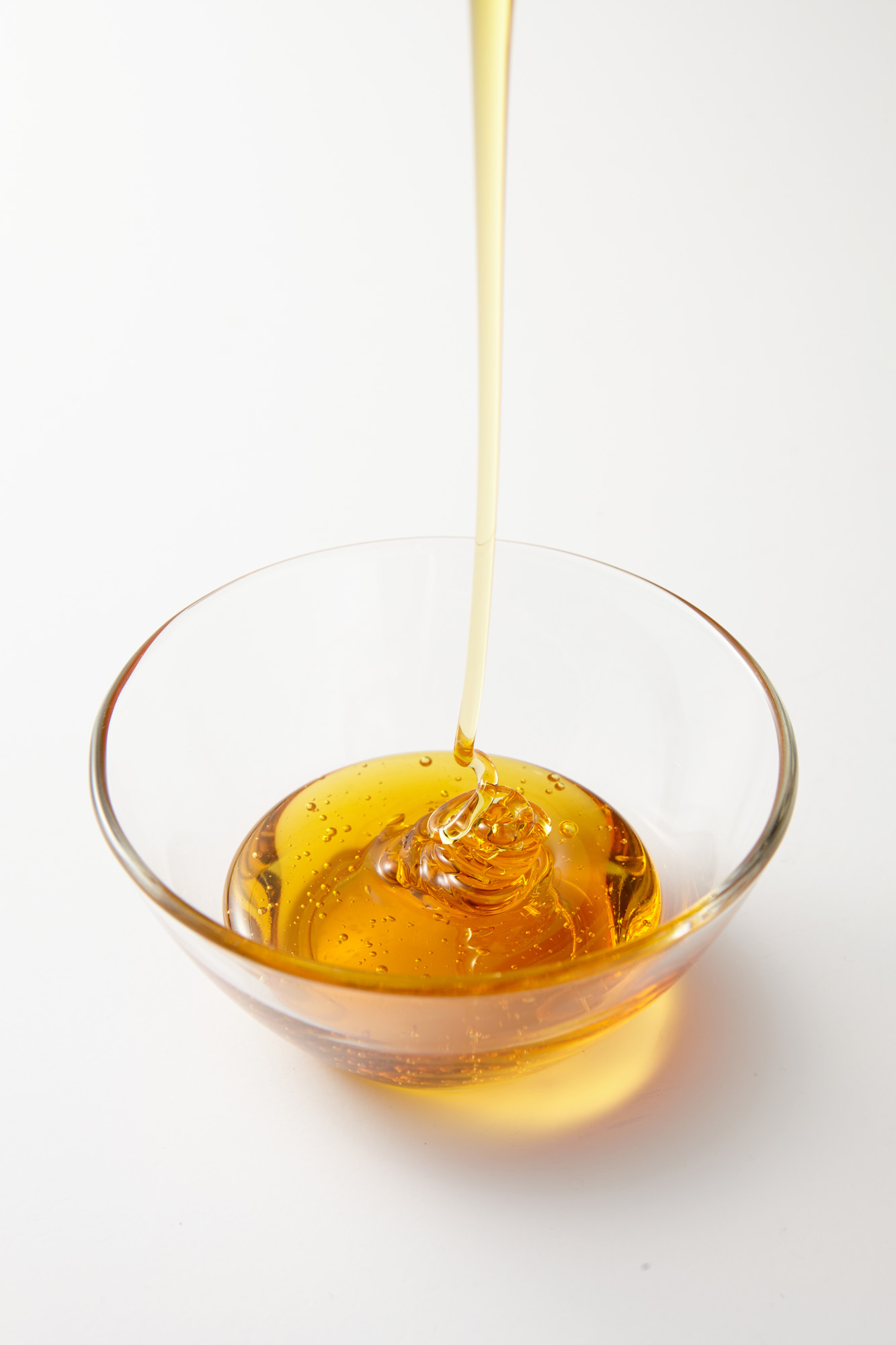
- Solid yeot and liquid mullyeot
- Type: Hangwa
- Course: Dessert
- Place of origin: Korea
- Main ingredients: bap (cooked rice), yeotgireum (powdered barley malt)

Korean name
- Hangul: 엿
- RR: yeot
- MR: yŏt
- IPA: [jʌt̚]

Yeot (Korean: 엿) is a variety of hangwa, or Korean traditional confectionery. It can be made in either liquid or solid form, as a syrup, taffy, or candy. Yeot is made from steamed rice, glutinous rice, glutinous sorghum, corn, sweet potatoes, or mixed grains. It is presumed to have been used before the Goryeo period. The steamed ingredients are lightly fermented and boiled in a large pot called a sot for a long time.

Yeot boiled for a shorter time is called jocheong, liquid yeot. This sticky syrup-like jocheong is usually used as a condiment for cooking and for coating other hangwa, or as a dipping sauce for garae tteok.

If boiled for a longer time, the yeot will solidify when chilled, and is called gaeng yeot (갱엿). Gaeng yeot is originally brownish but if stretched (as taffy is prepared), the color lightens. Pan-fried beans, nuts, sesame, sunflower seeds, walnuts, or pumpkin can be added into or covered over the yeot as it chills. Variations of yeot are named for their secondary ingredients, as follows.

== Types ==
- Ssallyeot (쌀엿) – made from rice yeast.
- Hobangnyeot (호박엿) – made with pumpkin, local specialty of Ulleungdo
- Hwanggollyeot (황골엿) – made from a mixture of rice, corn, and malt
- Kkaeyeot (깨엿) – covered with kkae (깨, sesame)
- Dangnyeot (닭엿) – local specialty of Jeju Island, made with glutinous millet and chicken
- Kkwongnyeot (꿩엿) – local specialty of Jeju Island, made with glutinous millet and pheasant meat
- Dwaejigogiyeot (돼지고기엿) – local specialty of Jeju Island, made with glutinous millet and pork
- Haneuraegiyeot (하늘애기엿) – local specialty of Jeju Island, made with glutinous millet and haneulaegi herb
- Boriyeot (보리엿) – local specialty of Jeju Island, made with barley
- Maneullyeot (마늘엿) – local specialty of Jeju Island, made with glutinous millet and garlic
- Gotgamnyeot (곶감엿) – local specialty of Sangju, made with dried persimmons
- Yangnyeot (약엿) – made with sesame, walnut, ginger, jujube. It was traditionally used as a tonic for sick people.
- Tongoksusuyeot (통옥수수엿) – made from corn.

== The word yeot as slang ==
The Korean phrase "eat yeot" (엿 먹어라) has adopted a vulgar meaning in recent years. The phrase is comparable to the English term "fuck you". According to one account, the phrase originated from a middle-school entry exams scandal of 1964. One of the multiple choice questions asked in the exam: "Which of the following ingredients can be used instead of yeot oil (엿기름; barley malt) to make yeot?" The correct answer was diastase, but another one of the multiple choices was Korean radish juice, which many people argued was also a correct answer. The parents of the students whose grades suffered from this result held demonstrations and protests in front of government education bureaus and offices, holding up yeot made with radish juice and yelling to the officials to "eat yeot".

The phallic shape of raw yeot had also led the candy to be used as a euphemism for penis as early as the sixteenth century.

== Gallery ==
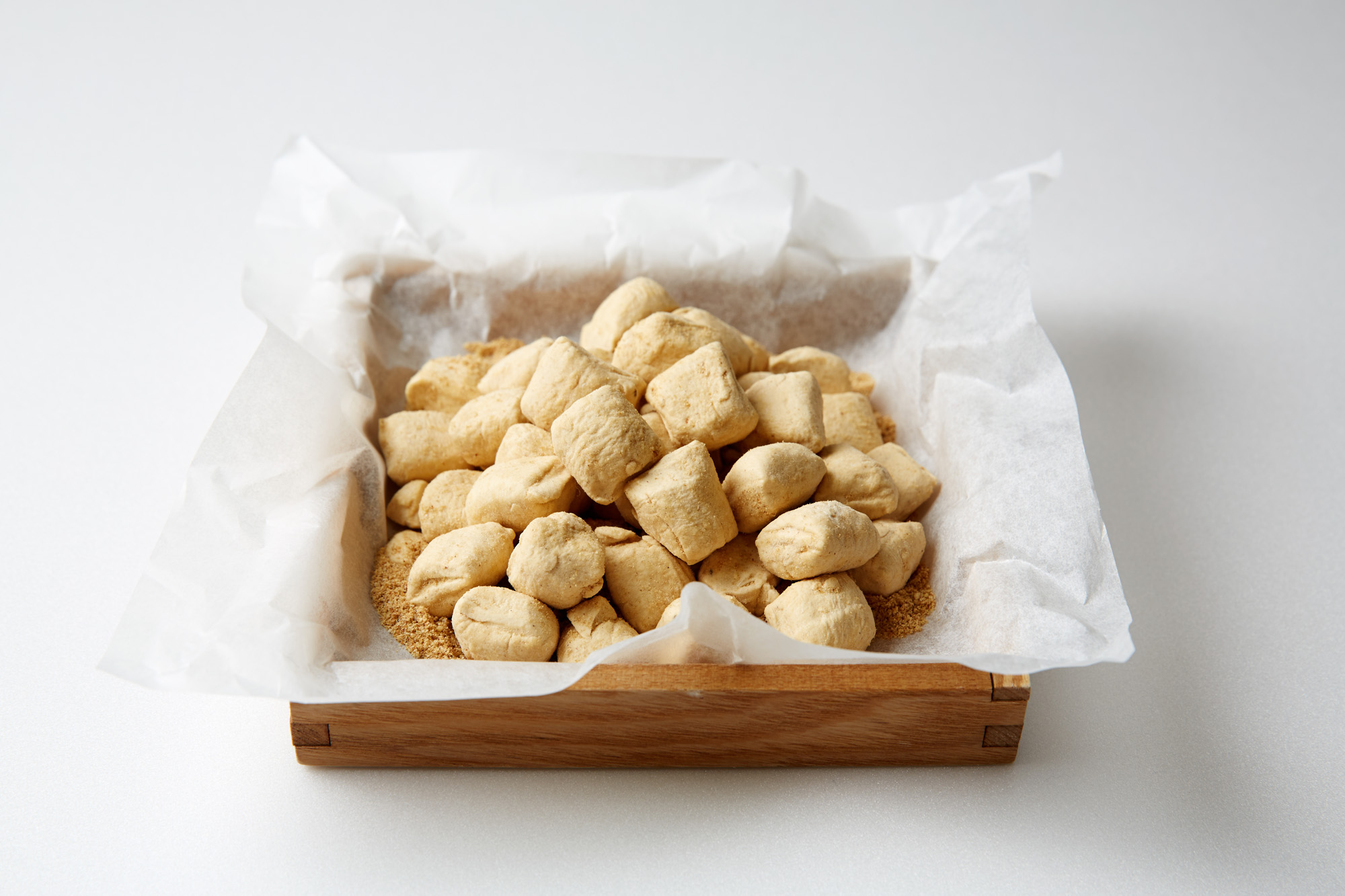
Yeot coated with gomul

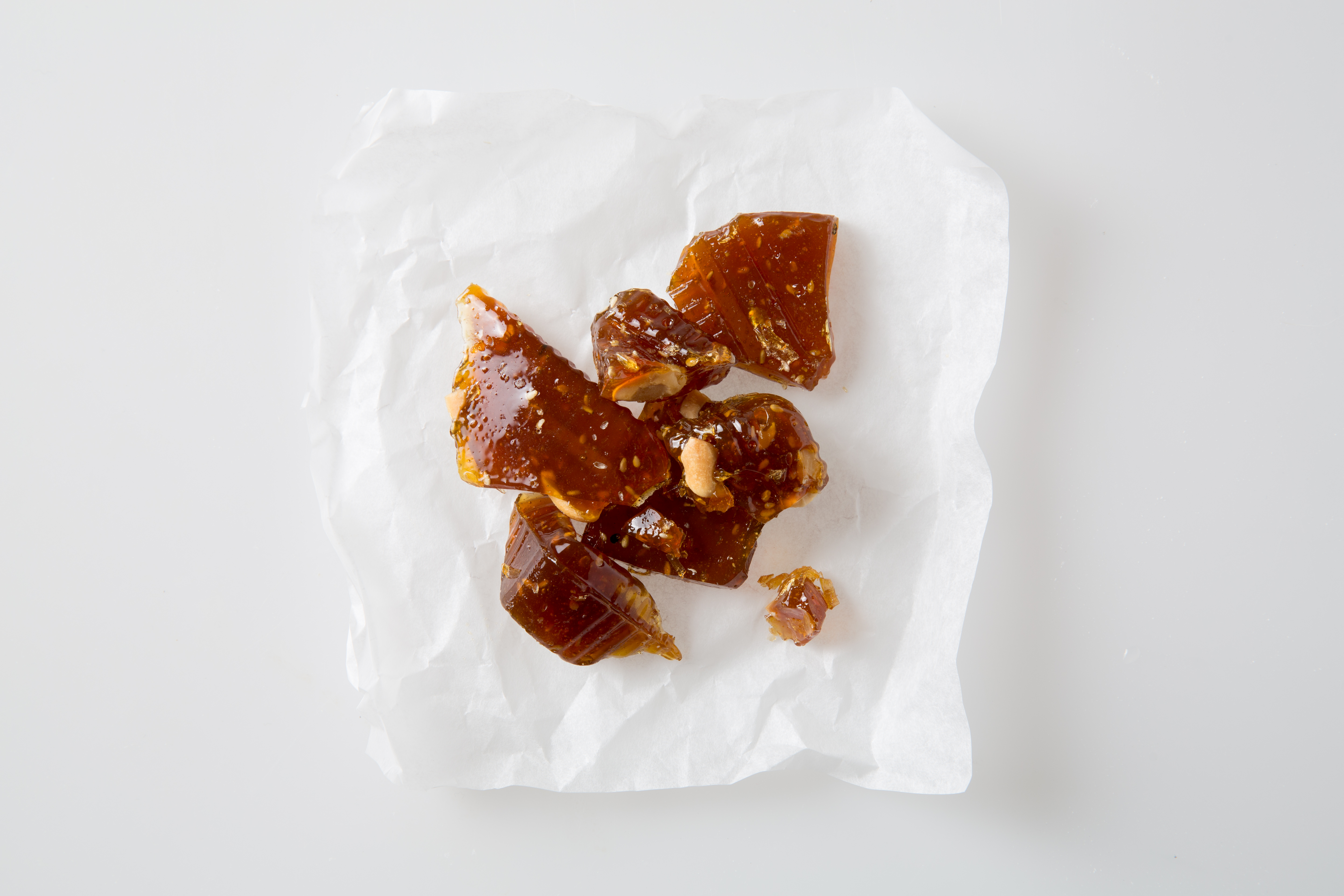
Candy-like yeot

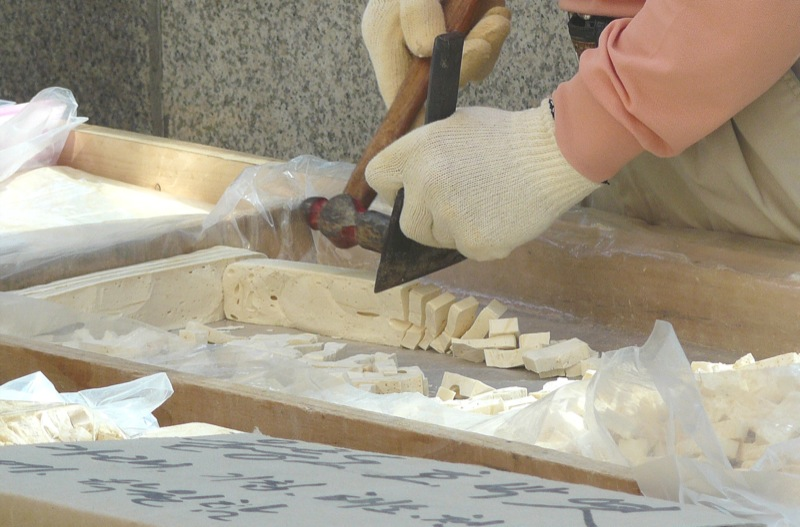
Making hobakyeot, pumpkin candies

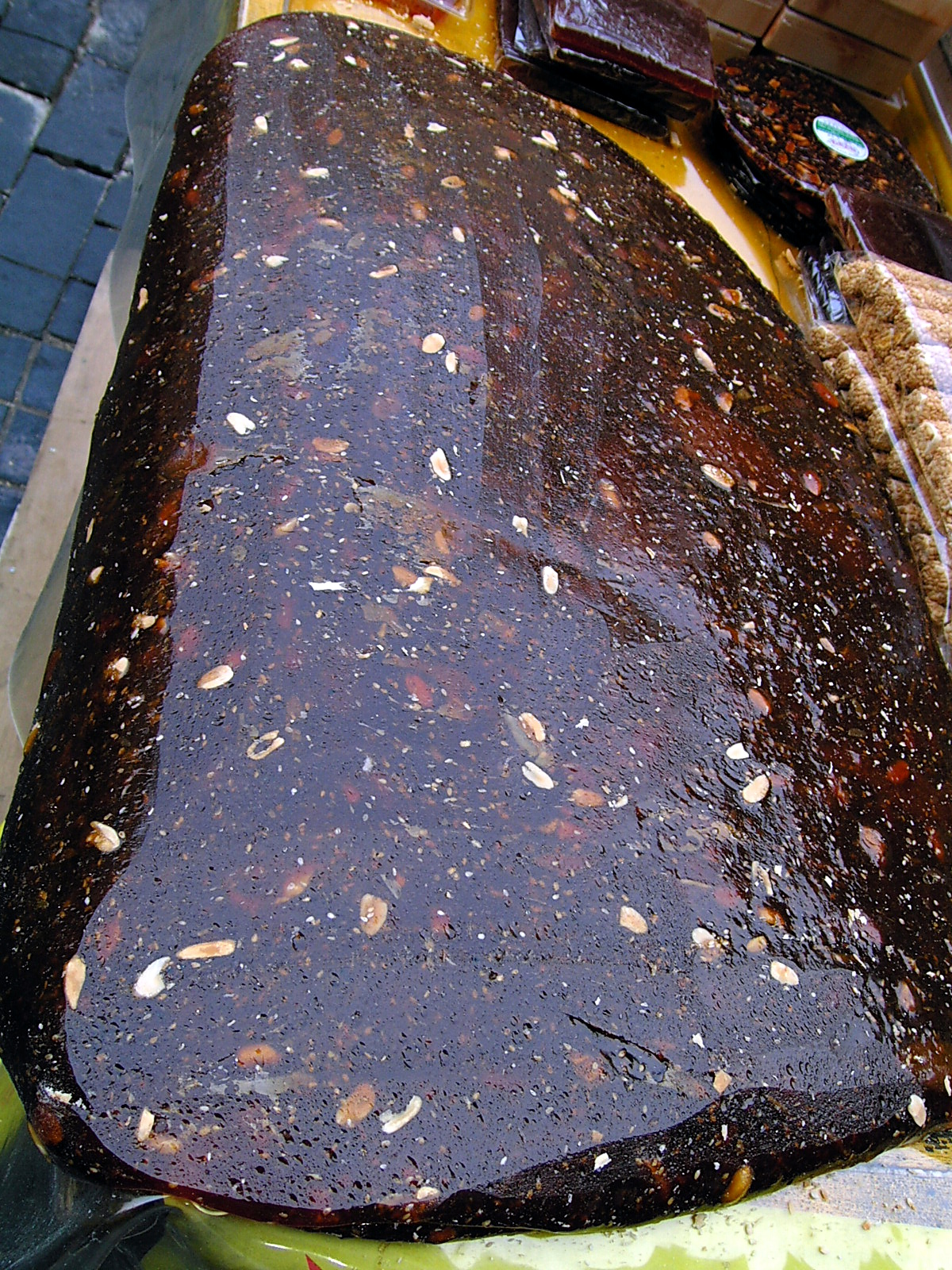
Saenggang yeot, a ginger candy

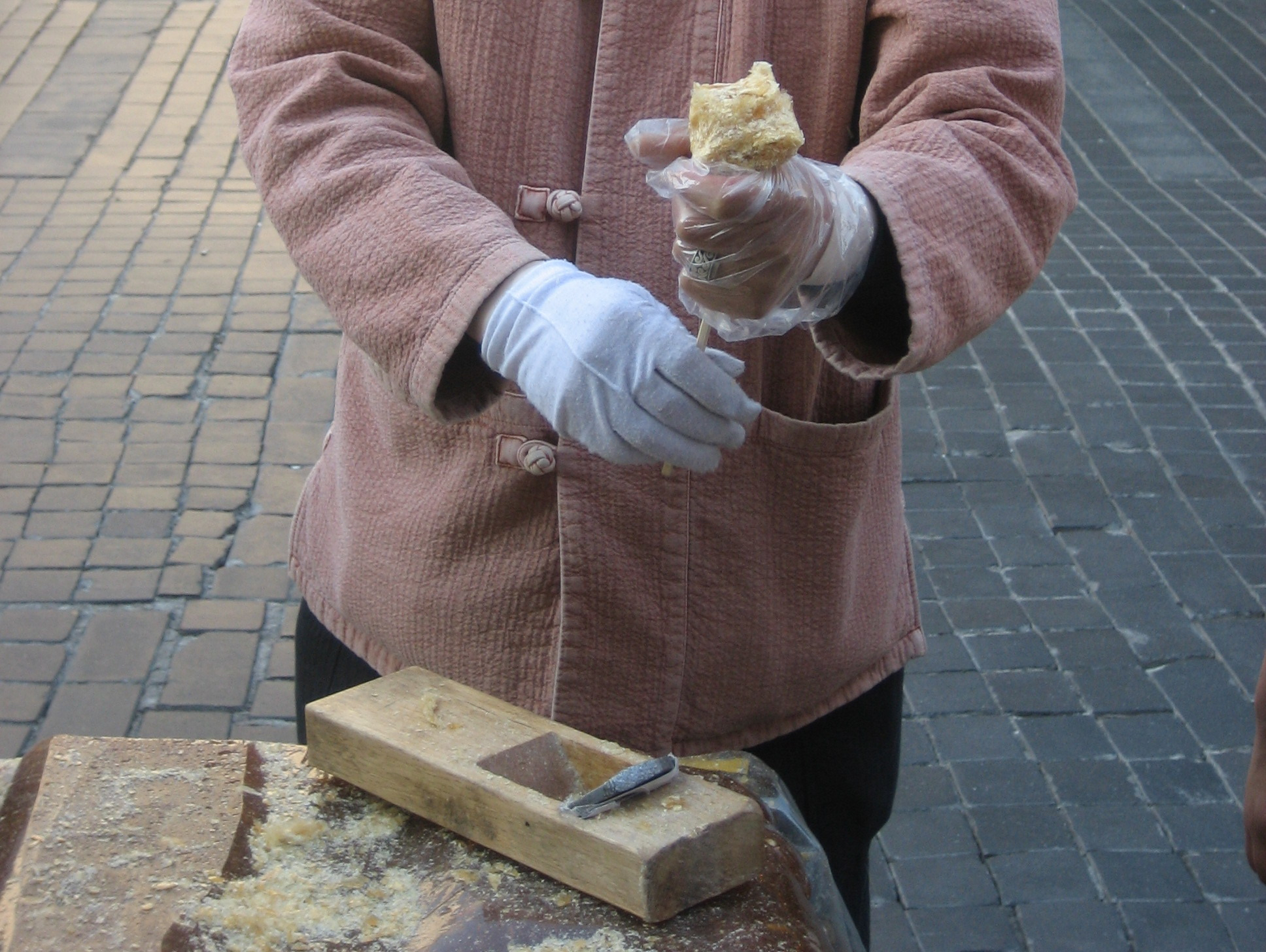
Shaping yeot

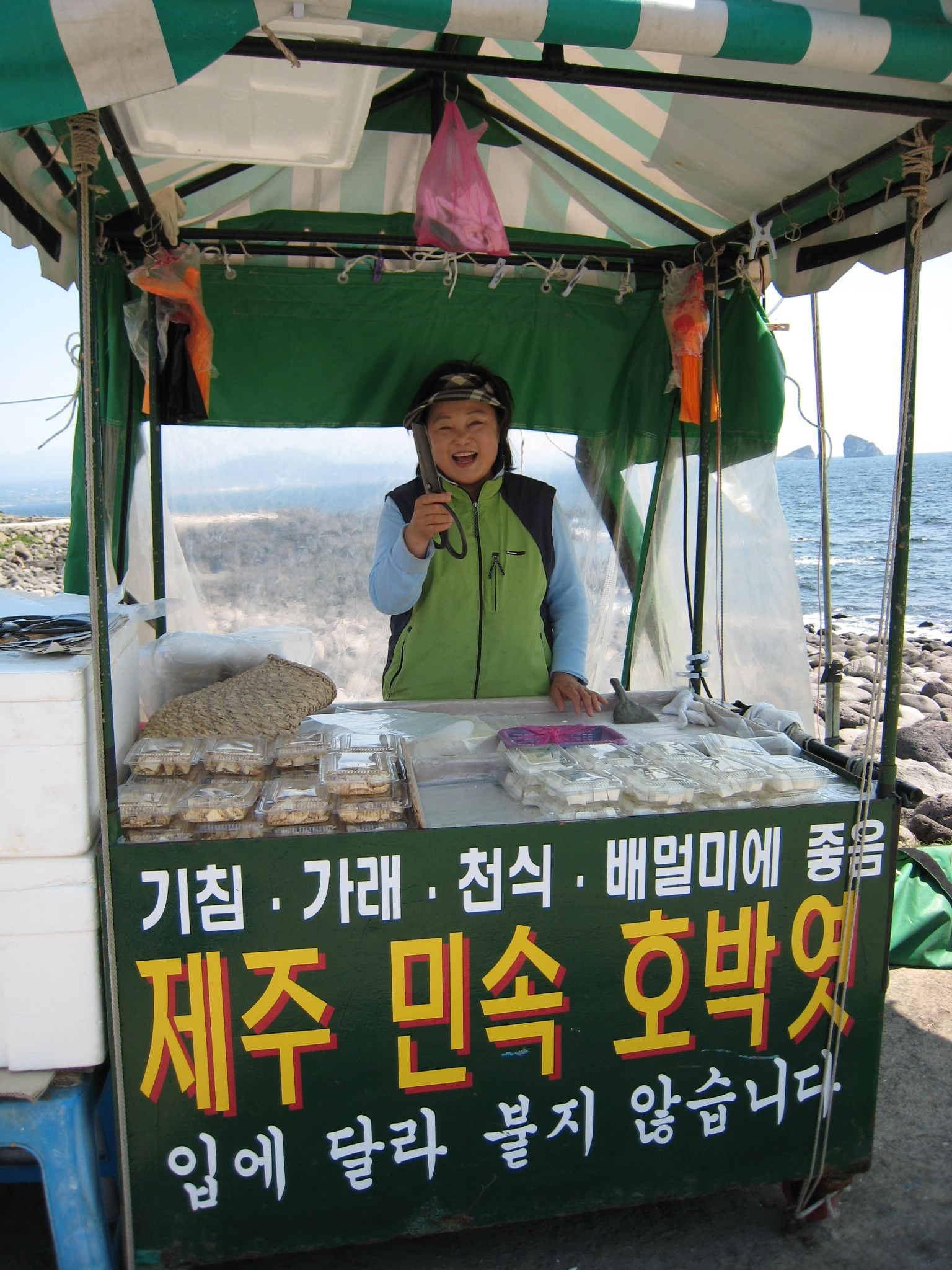
Yeotjangsu, yeot seller

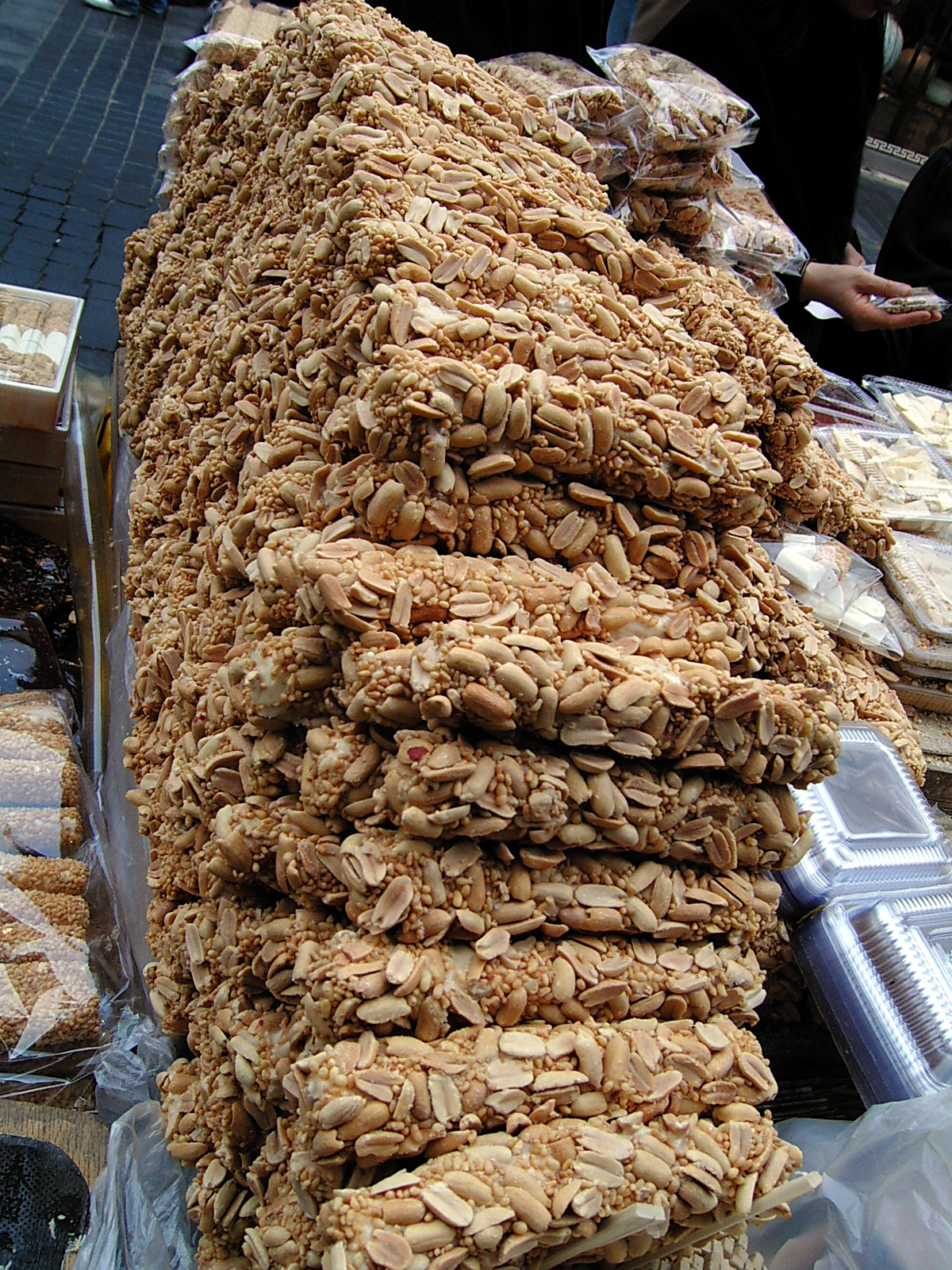
Ttangkongyeot, yeot covered with peanuts

== See also ==
- Hangwa – Term for Korean confectionery
- List of Korean desserts
- List of syrups
- Rice syrup – Sweetener derived from rice
