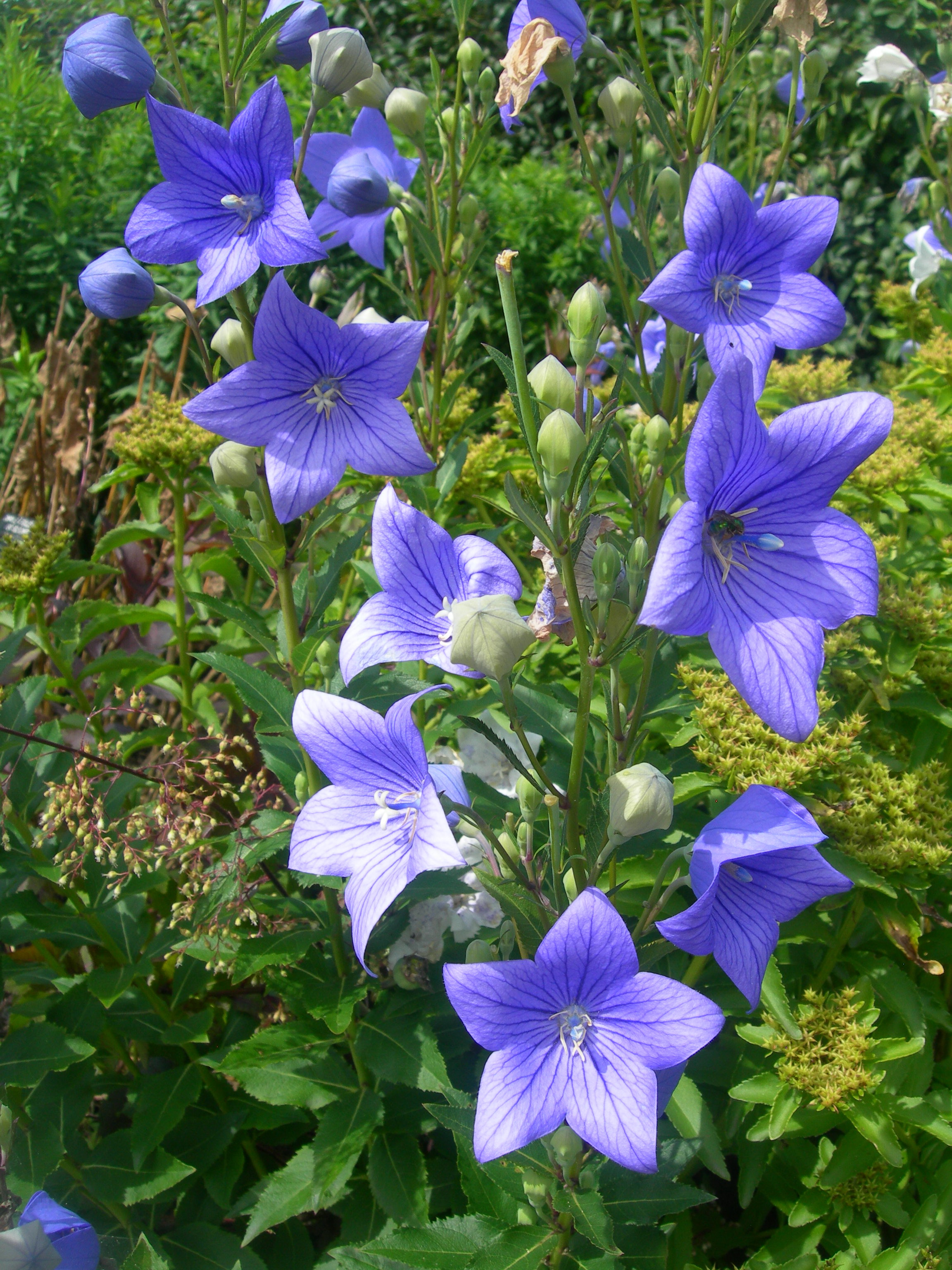

Scientific classification
- Kingdom: Plantae
- Clade: Tracheophytes
- Clade: Angiosperms
- Clade: Eudicots
- Clade: Asterids
- Order: Asterales
- Family: Campanulaceae
- Subfamily: Campanuloideae
- Genus: Platycodon; A.DC.
- Species: P. grandiflorus

Binomial name
- Platycodon grandiflorus (Jacq.) A.DC.

Synonyms
- Campanula gentianoides Lam. Campanula glauca Thunb. Campanula grandiflora Jacq. Platycodon autumnalis Decne. Platycodon chinensis Lindl. & Paxton; Platycodon glaucus (Thunb.) Nakai; Platycodon mariesii (Lynch) Wittm. Platycodon sinensis Lem.

= Platycodon =

Species of plant

Platycodon grandiflorus (from Ancient Greek πλατύς (platús), meaning "flat", and κώδων (kódon) meaning "bell") is a species of herbaceous flowering perennial plant of the family Campanulaceae, and the only member of the genus Platycodon. It is native to East Asia (China, Korea, Japan, and the Russian Far East). It is commonly known as balloon flower (referring to the balloon-shaped flower buds), Chinese bellflower, or platycodon.

== Description ==
Growing to 60 cm (24 in) tall by 30 cm (12 in) wide, it is an herbaceous perennial with dark green leaves and blue flowers in late summer. A notable feature of the plant is the flower bud, which swells like a balloon before fully opening. The five petals are fused together into a bell shape at the base, like its relatives, the campanulas.

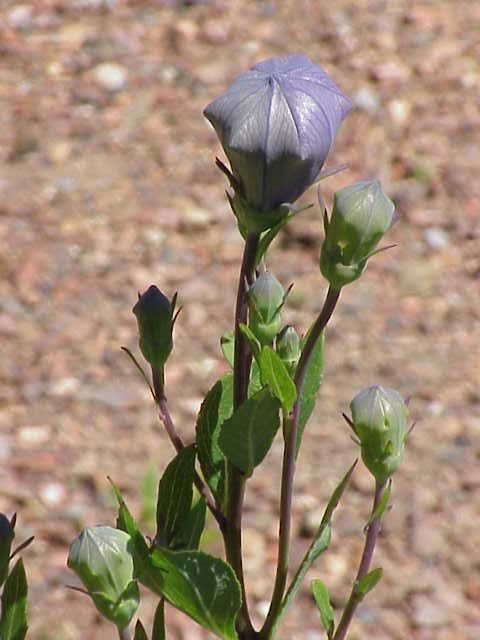
Swelling balloon-shaped buds

Newly open flower

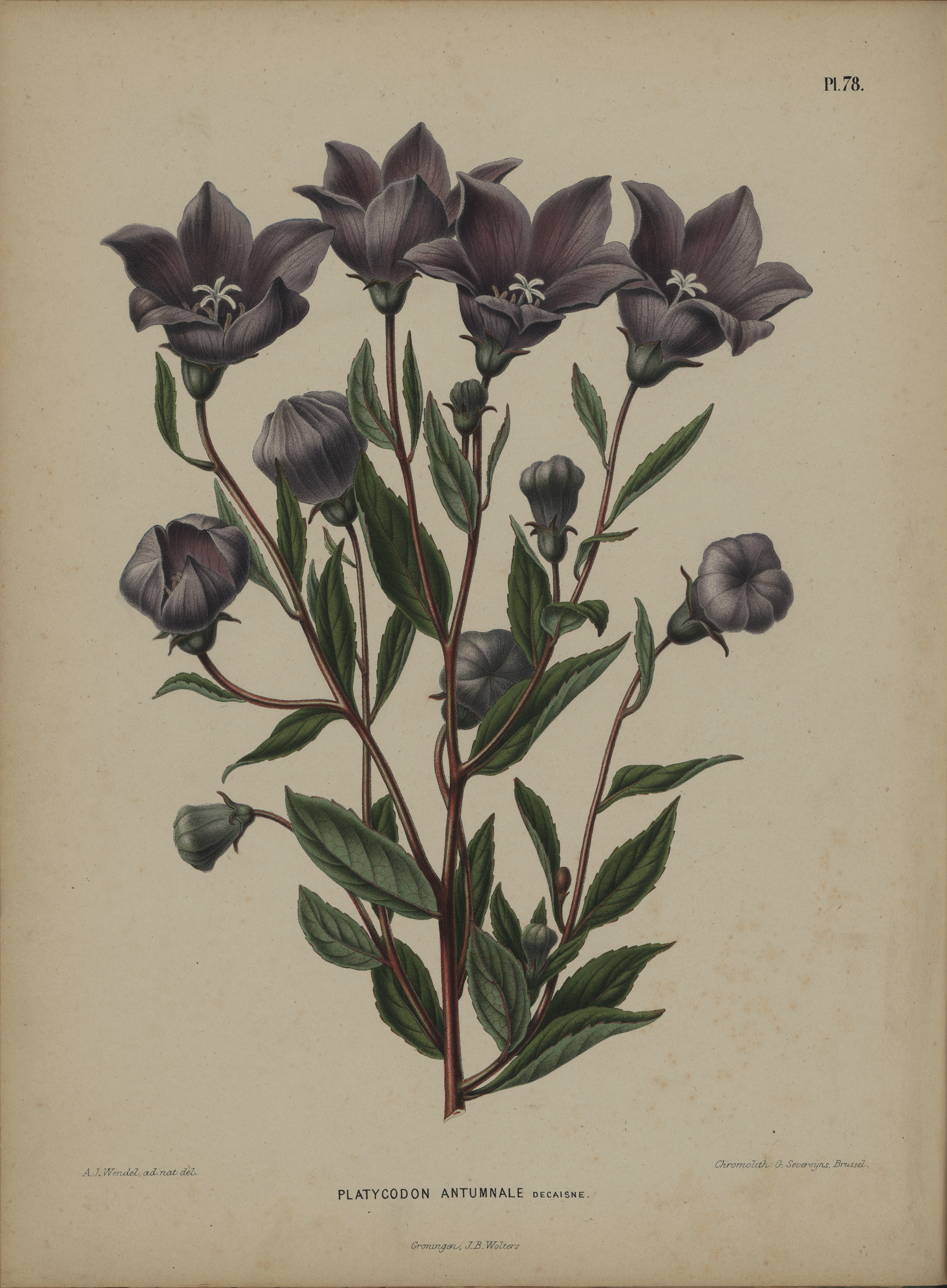
Platycodon grandiflorus by Abraham Jacobus Wendel, 1868

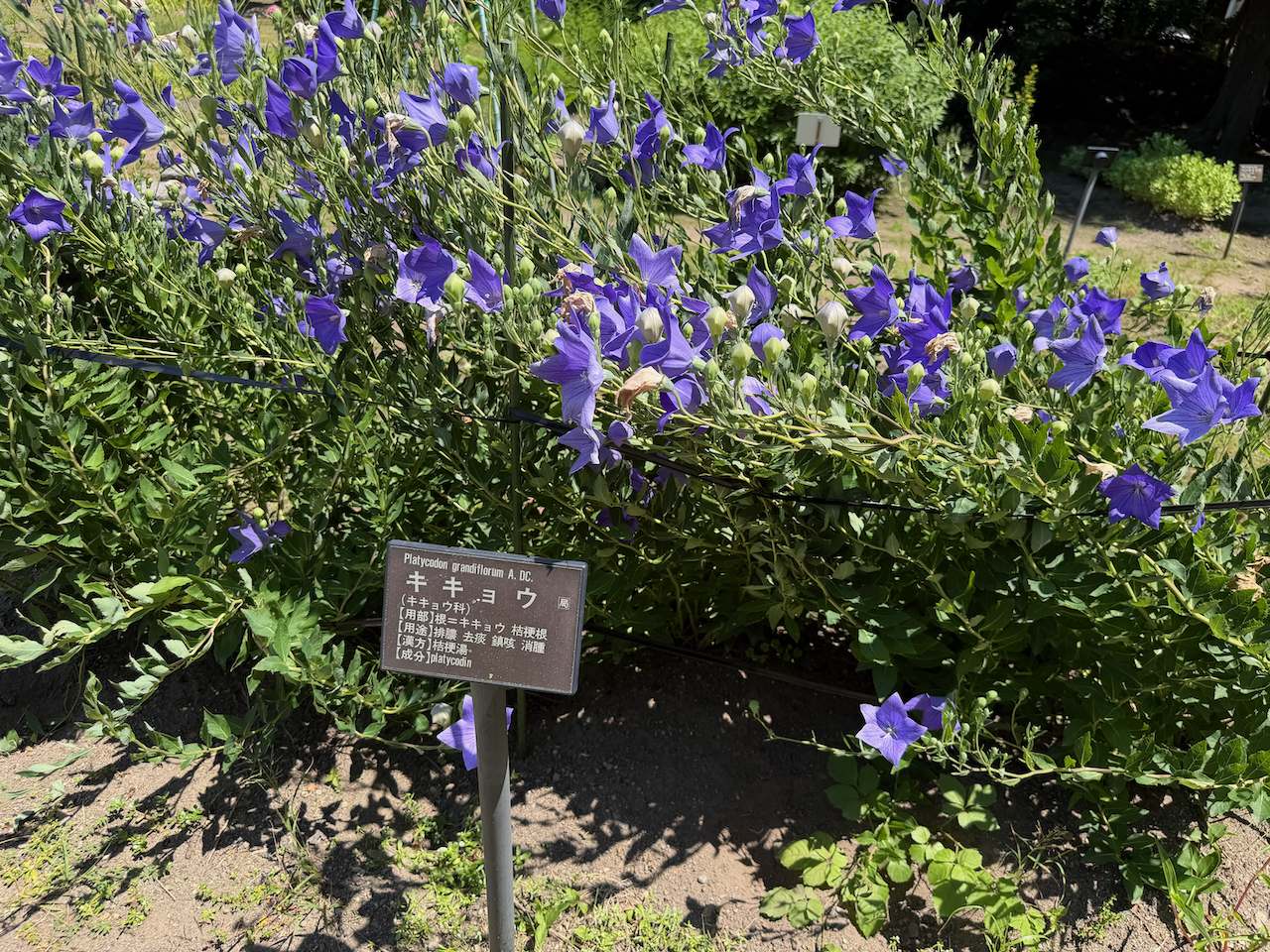
"Kikyo" (platycodon) flowers, taken at the Oyaku-en Garden in Aizu-Wakamatsu, Japan.

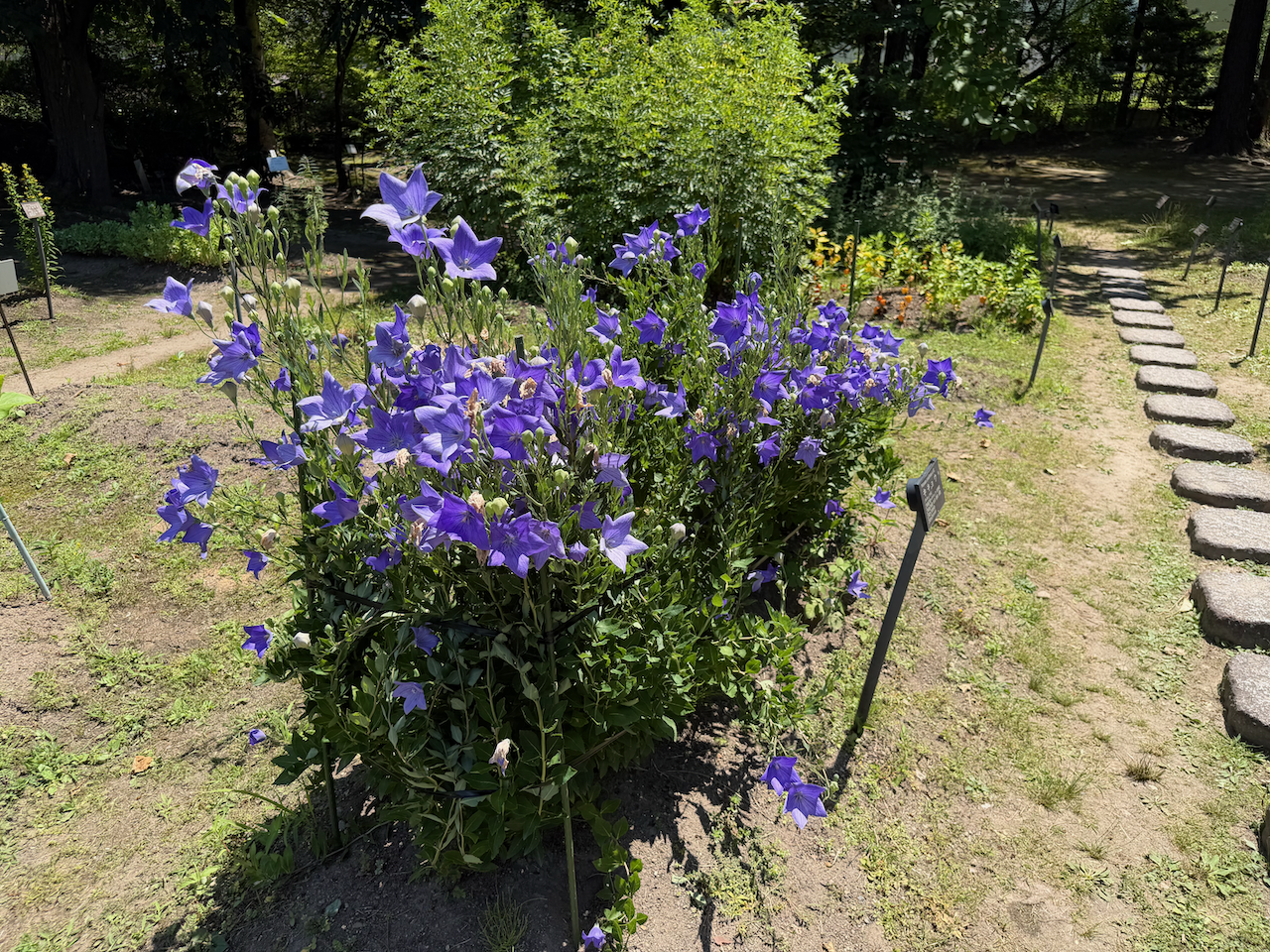
"Kikyo" (platycodon) flowers, side-profile.

== Ecology ==
Platycodon grandiflorus is a perennial plant which is commonly grown in mountains and fields. It is 40 to 100 centimeters (16 to 39 in) high and has thick roots, and white juice comes out when the stem is cut. Leaves are 5 to 12 centimeters (2.0 to 4.7 in) long, with narrow ends and teeth on the edges.

Flowers bloom purple or white in July and August, with one or several running upward at the end of the circle. The flower crown is divided into five branches in the shape of an open bell.

It lives throughout Japan, China, and eastern Siberia, including the Korean Peninsula.

== Cultivation ==
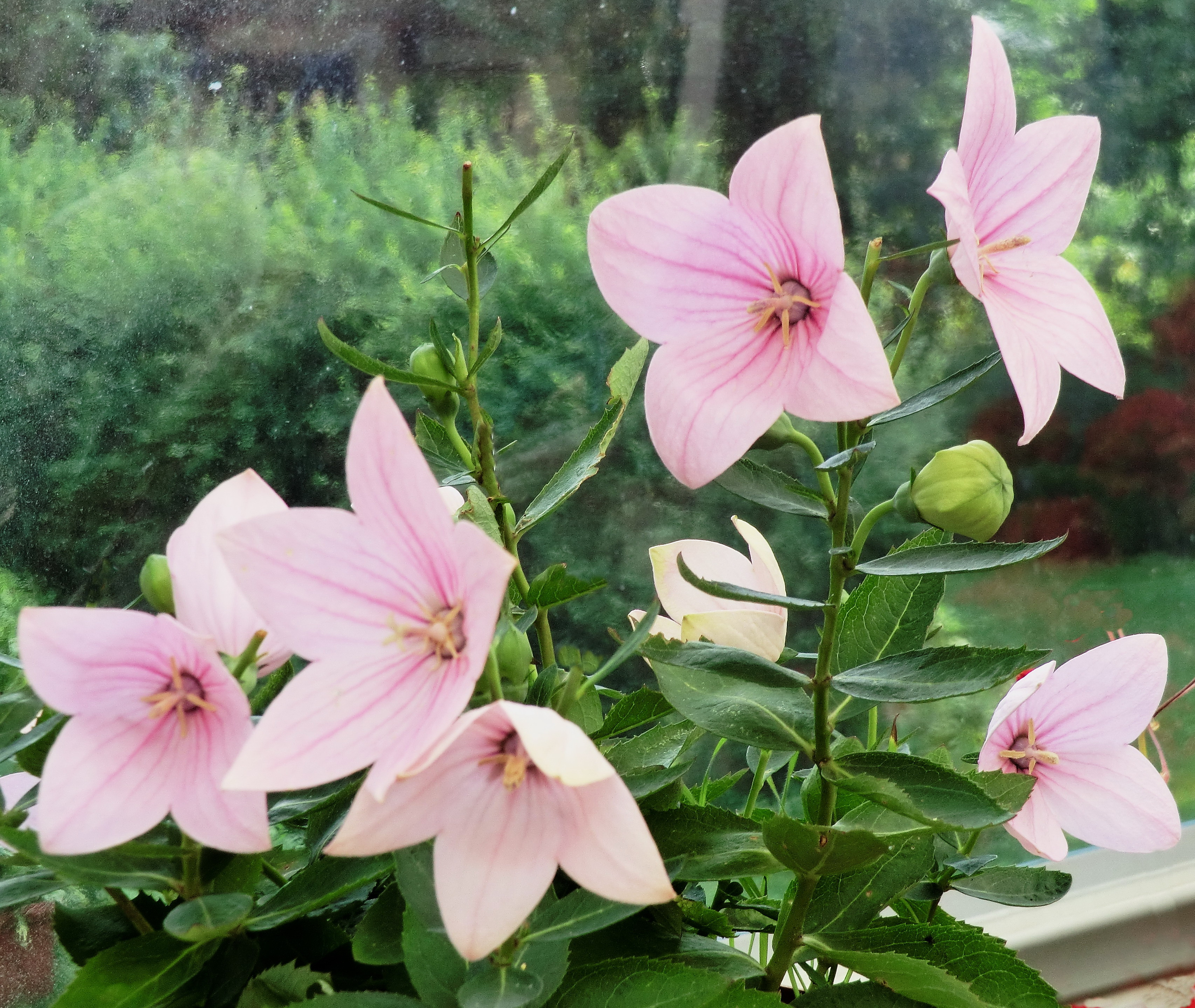
Pink flowered form

This plant is hardy down to −40 °C (−40 °F), and can be cultivated in USDA zones 3A to 9b. It dies down completely in winter, reappearing in late spring and flowering in summer. However, plants are widely available from nurseries in full flower from April onwards.

Though the species has blue flowers, there are varieties with white, pink, and purple blooms. In Korea, white flowers are more common. This plant, together with its cultivars 'Apoyama group' and 'Mariesii', have gained the Royal Horticultural Society's Award of Garden Merit.

== Uses ==
=== Culinary ===
==== Korea ====
In Korea, the plant as well as its root are referred to as doraji (도라지). The root, fresh or dried, is one of the most common namul vegetables. It is also one of the most frequent ingredients in bibimbap. Sometimes, rice is cooked with balloon flower root to make doraji-bap. Preparation of the root always involves soaking and washing (usually rubbing it with coarse sea salt and rinsing it multiple times), which gets rid of the bitter taste.

The root is also used to make desserts, such as doraji-jeonggwa. Syrup made from the root, called doraji-cheong (balloon flower root honey), can be used to make doraji-cha (balloon flower root tea). The root can be used to infuse liquor called doraji-sul, typically using distilled soju or other unflavored hard alcohol that has an ABV higher than 30% as a base.

In addition, other ingredients include calcium, fiber, iron, minerals, proteins and vitamins.

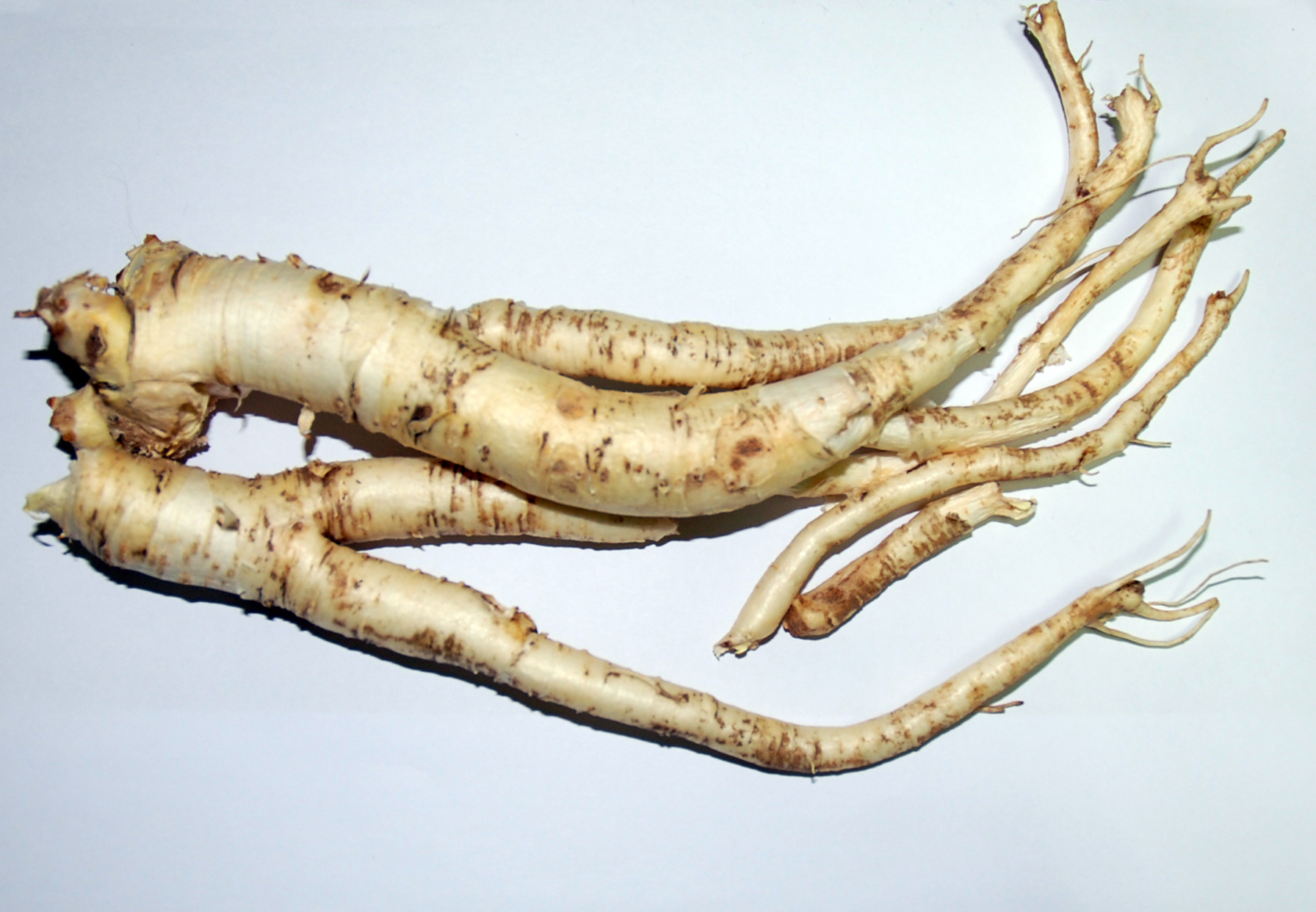
Doraji (balloon flower root)

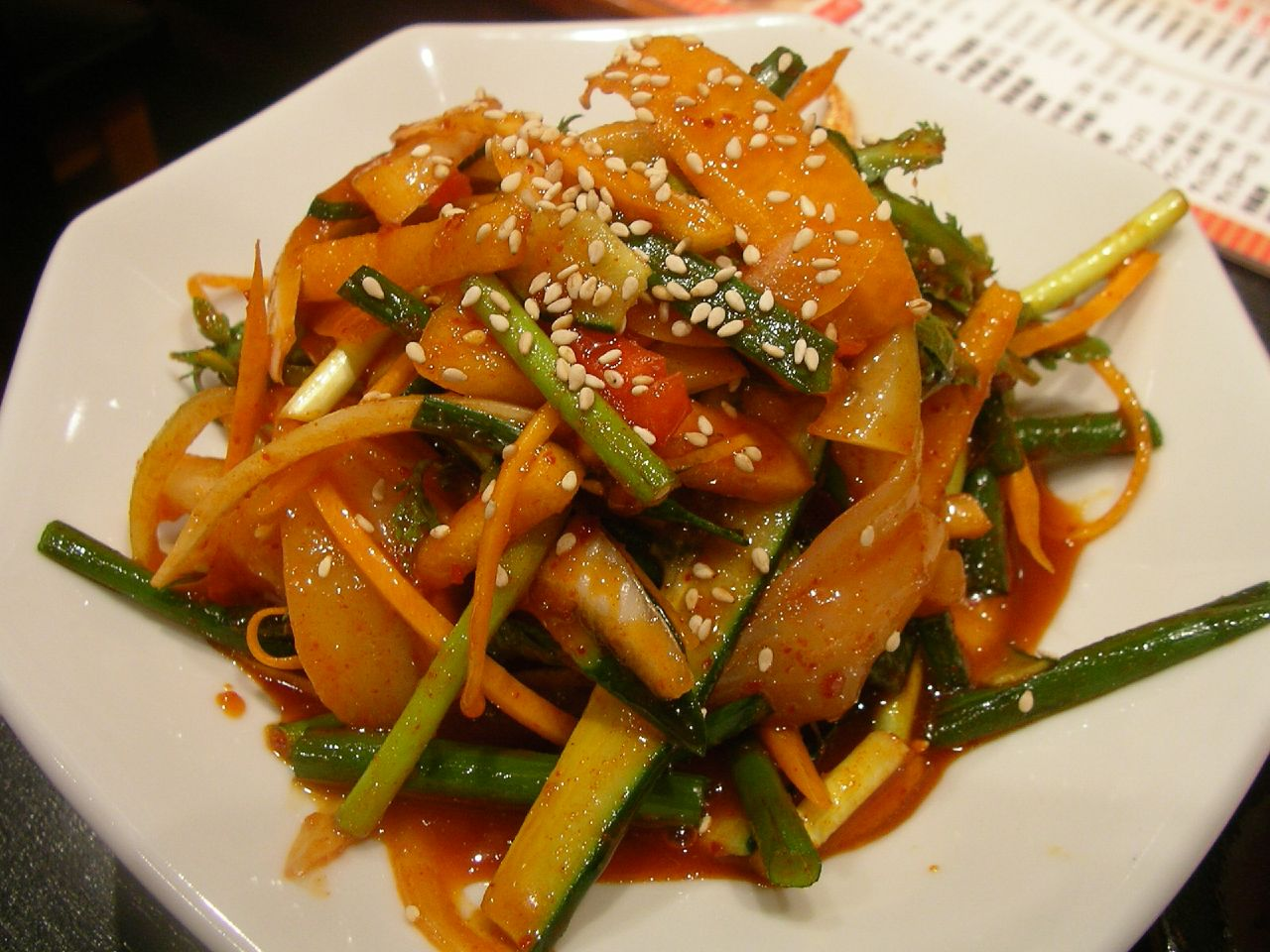
Doraji-muchim (seasoned balloon flower root)

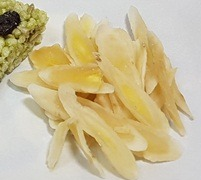
Doraji-jeonggwa (balloon flower root sweets)

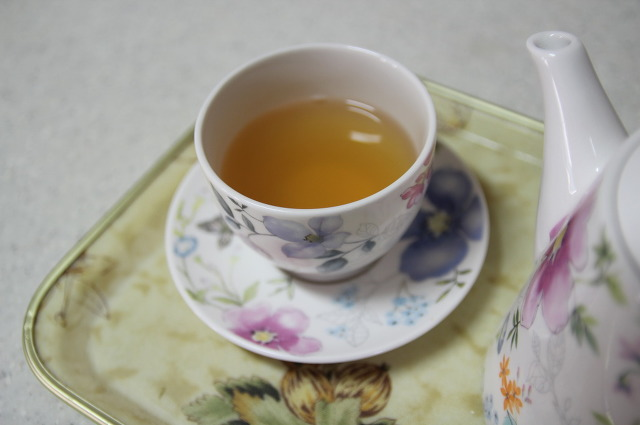
Doraji-cha (balloon flower root tea)

=== Medicinal ===
The extracts and purified platycoside compounds (saponins) from the roots of Platycodon grandiflorum may exhibit neuroprotective, antimicrobial, anti-inflammatory, anti-cancer, anti-allergy, improved insulin resistance, and cholesterol-lowering properties. Evidence for these potential effects was mainly observed in vitro, with the exception of cholesterol-lowering effects documented in vitro and in rats. The lack of efficacy and limited safety data in humans, however, necessitate further research.

==== China ====
The Chinese bellflower (called 桔梗 in Chinese) is also used in traditional Chinese medicine.

In China, they are used as a cough suppressant and expectorant for common colds, cough, sore throat, tonsillitis, and chest congestion.

==== Korea ====
In Korea, the roots are commonly used for treating bronchitis, asthma, tuberculosis, diabetes, and other inflammatory diseases.

=== Cultural ===
==== Japan ====
The bellflower is called kikyō (桔梗) in Japanese. Traditionally, it is one of the Seven Autumn Flowers. In addition, the "Bellflower Seal" (桔梗紋, kikyōmon) is the crest (kamon) of some clans.

Kikyō is a plain Kikyōmon.

Toki Kikyō is a variant used by the Toki clan, the Akechi clan, among others.

Ōta Kikyō is another variant used by the Ōta clan.

Seimei Kikyō / Seimei Kikyō (晴明紋; lit. "Clearest/Brightest Crest", or the "Seal of Abe-no-Seimei") is a pentagram used by Abe no Seimei as the symbol of the Onmyōryō (Bureau of Taoist Geomancy) and Onmyōdō-itself, given its association with the Five Chinese Elements.

==== Korea ====
Doraji taryeong (Korean: 도라지타령) is one of the most popular folk songs in both North and South Korea, and in China among the ethnic Koreans. It is also a well known song in Japan, by the name Toraji (Japanese: トラジ).

It is a folk song originated from Eunyul in Hwanghae Province. However, the currently sung version is classified as a Gyeonggi minyo (Gyeonggi Province folk song), as the rhythm and the melody have changed to acquire those characteristics.
