= Gwapyeon =

Traditional Korean confection

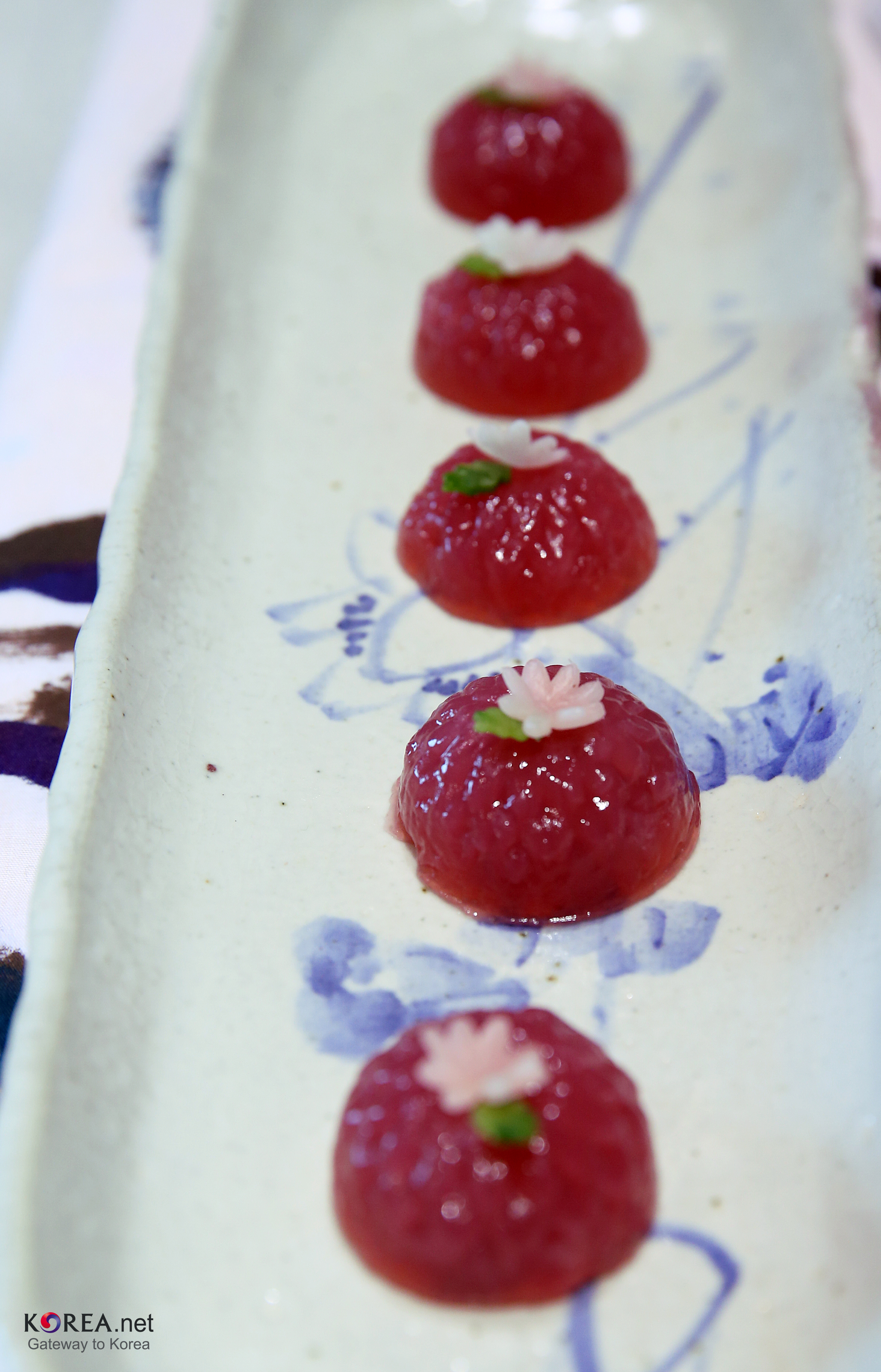
- Type: Hangwa
- Course: Dessert
- Place of origin: Korea
- Associated cuisine: Korean cuisine
- Main ingredients: Fruits, honey

Korean name
- Hangul: 과편
- Hanja: 果片
- RR: gwapyeon
- MR: kwap'yŏn
- IPA: [kwa.pʰjʌn]

Gwapyeon (Korean: 과편) is a jelly-like hangwa (traditional Korean confection) made with fruits. The colorful fruit jelly is commonly served at banquets. This classic dessert was served in the royal court during the Joseon dynasty.

== Preparation ==
Fruits with a sweet-tart flavor and higher pectin content, such as Korean cherry, Chinese quince, apricot, mountain hawthorn, bokbunja, Oriental cherry, bog blueberry and magnolia berry are preferred for making gwapyeon. The jelly can be made by boiling any of the above fruits in water, sieving it, then adding honey and simmering it for a long time on low heat. Starch, agar, or other gelling agents can be used as a time-saver. Boiled fruit juice is then cooled in a mold until it solidifies. It is sliced into bite-size pieces.

== See also ==
- Muk
