= Dangyuja =

Citrus fruit and plant

- Species: Citrus grandis (L.) Osbeck
- Origin: Jeju Island

Dangyuja (Korean: 당유자 [taŋ.ju.dʑa]) is a Korean citrus fruit that is a specialty of Jeju Island. In Jeju language, it is called daengyuji (댕유지 [tɛŋ.ju.dʑi]). Dangyuja has a similar shape and flavour to yuzu, but is genealogically a variety of pomelo.

Dangyuja has been included in the Ark of Taste, an international catalogue of endangered heritage foods.

== Description ==
The evergreen broad-leaved tree grows to an average height of 6 metres (20 ft), with branches that have thorns on them, and the leaves are 10–13 centimetres (3.9–5.1 in) long. The fruit is 10–12 centimetres (3.9–4.7 in) long, 9–10 centimetres (3.5–3.9 in) wide, and usually weighs 300–500 grams (11–18 oz).

The colour of ripe fruit can range from dark yellow to yellow-orange. The rind is about 9 millimetres (0.35 in) thick, very fragrant, and slightly bitter, while the flesh and juice is rich in sourness, with a unique fragrance.

== Uses ==
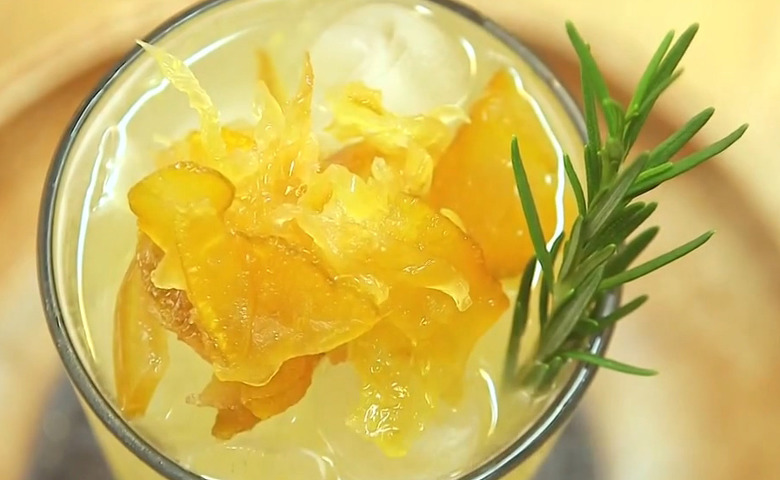
Dangyuja-ade

=== Culinary ===
Today, the fruit is used mainly for tea, dangyuja-cha (dangyuja tea), whose preparation is very similar to that of yuja tea. In the past, dangyuja was often used in home remedies to prevent and treat the common cold. A soup called daengyuji-kkul-tang (literally "dangyuja honey soup"), was made of the crushed flesh of dangyuja, honey, and ginger. Cooked in the ashes of a fire, the mixture attains a thin syrup-like consistency.

=== Medicinal ===
In traditional Korean medicine, the fruit is used to treat various gastrointestinal ailments. Dongui Bogam, an encyclopaedic medical book published in 1613, writes that dangyujas can help detoxify and purify the stomach, treat alcohol intoxication, and stimulate a poor appetite.

== See also ==
- Byeonggyul
