= Cheong (food) =

Any of various sweetened foods in Korean cuisine

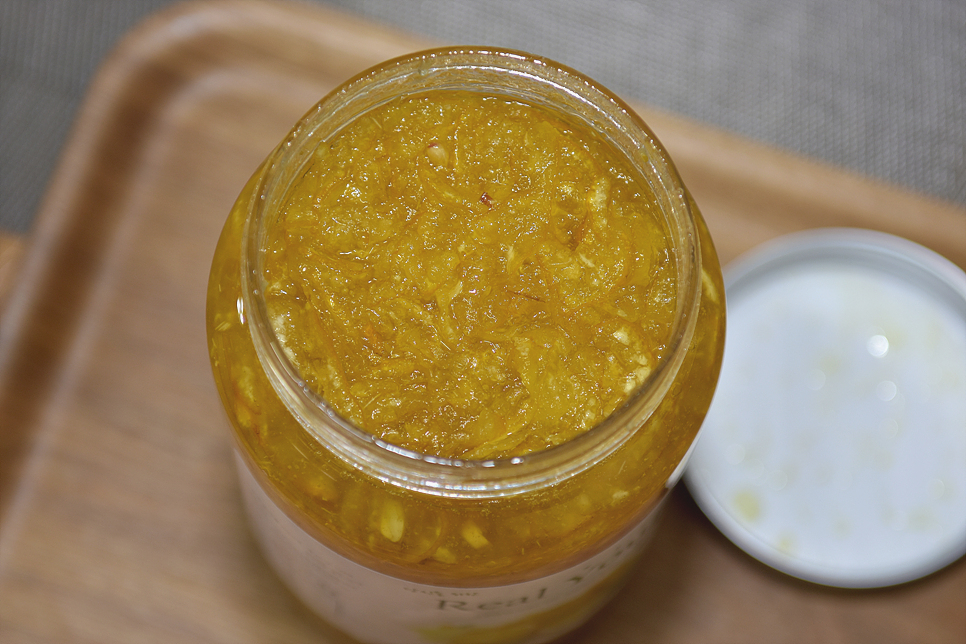
- A jar of yuja-cheong
- Place of origin: Korea
- Associated cuisine: Korean cuisine
- Similar dishes: syrup; fruit preserve; marmalade

Korean name
- Hangul: 청
- Hanja: 淸
- RR: cheong
- MR: ch'ŏng
- IPA: tɕʰʌŋ

Cheong (Korean: 청; Hanja: 淸) is a name for various sweetened foods in the form of syrups, marmalades, and fruit preserves. In Korean cuisine, cheong is used as a tea base, as a honey or sugar substitute in cooking, as a condiment, and also as an alternative medicine to treat the common cold and other minor illnesses.

Originally, the word cheong (청; 淸) was used to refer to honey in Korean royal court cuisine. The name jocheong (조청; 造淸; "crafted honey") was given to mullyeot (liquid-form yeot) and other human-made honey-substitutes. Outside the royal court, honey was called kkul (꿀), which is a native Korean (non-Sino-Korean) word.

== Varieties ==
- Jocheong (조청; "crafted honey") or mullyeot (물엿; liquid yeot): rice syrup or more recently also corn syrup
- Maesil-cheong or Maesilaek (매실청/매실액; "plum syrup")
- Mogwa-cheong (모과청; quince preserve)
- Mucheong (무청; radish syrup)
- Mu-kkul-cheong (무꿀청; radish and honey syrup)
- Yuja-cheong (유자청; yuja marmalade)
- Saenggang-cheong (생강청; ginger marmalade)
- Gochu-cheong (고추청; Korean green chili marmalade)
- Maneul-cheong (마늘청; garlic pickle)
- Yangpa-cheong (양파청; onion marmalade)
- Odi-cheong (오디청; mulberry marmalade)
- Omija-cheong (오미자청; magnolia berry marmalade)
- Painaepeul-cheong (파인애플청; pineapple marmalade)
- Bae-cheong (배청; Korean pear marmalade)
- Bae-doraji-cheong (배도라지청; Korean pear and bellflower root marmalade)

=== Maesil-cheong ===
Maesil-cheong (매실청; 梅實淸; [mɛ.ɕil.tɕʰʌŋ]), also called "plum syrup", is an anti-microbial syrup made by sugaring ripe plums (Prunus mume). In Korean cuisine, maesil-cheong is used as a condiment and sugar substitute. The infusion made by mixing water with maesil-cheong is called maesil-cha (plum tea).

It can be made by simply mixing plums and sugar together, and then leaving them for about 100 days. To make syrup, the ratio of sugar to plum should be at least 1:1 to prevent fermentation, by which the liquid may turn into maesil-ju (plum wine). The plums can be removed after 100 days, and the syrup can be consumed right away, or mature for a year or more.

=== Mogwa-cheong ===
Mogwa-cheong (모과청 [moː.ɡwa.tɕʰʌŋ]), also called "preserved quince", is a cheong made by sugaring Chinese quince (Pseudocydonia sinensis). Either sugar or honey can be used to make mogwa-cheong. Mogwa-cheong is used as a tea base for mogwa-cha (quince tea) and mogwa-hwachae (quince punch), or as an ingredient in sauces and salad dressings.

=== Yuja-cheong ===
Yuja-cheong (유자청; 柚子淸; [juː.dʑa.tɕʰʌŋ]), also called "yuja marmalade", is a marmalade-like cheong made by sugaring peeled, depulped, and thinly sliced yuja (Citrus junos). It is used as a tea base for yuja-cha (yuja tea), as a honey-or-sugar-substitute in cooking, and as a condiment.

== Gallery ==
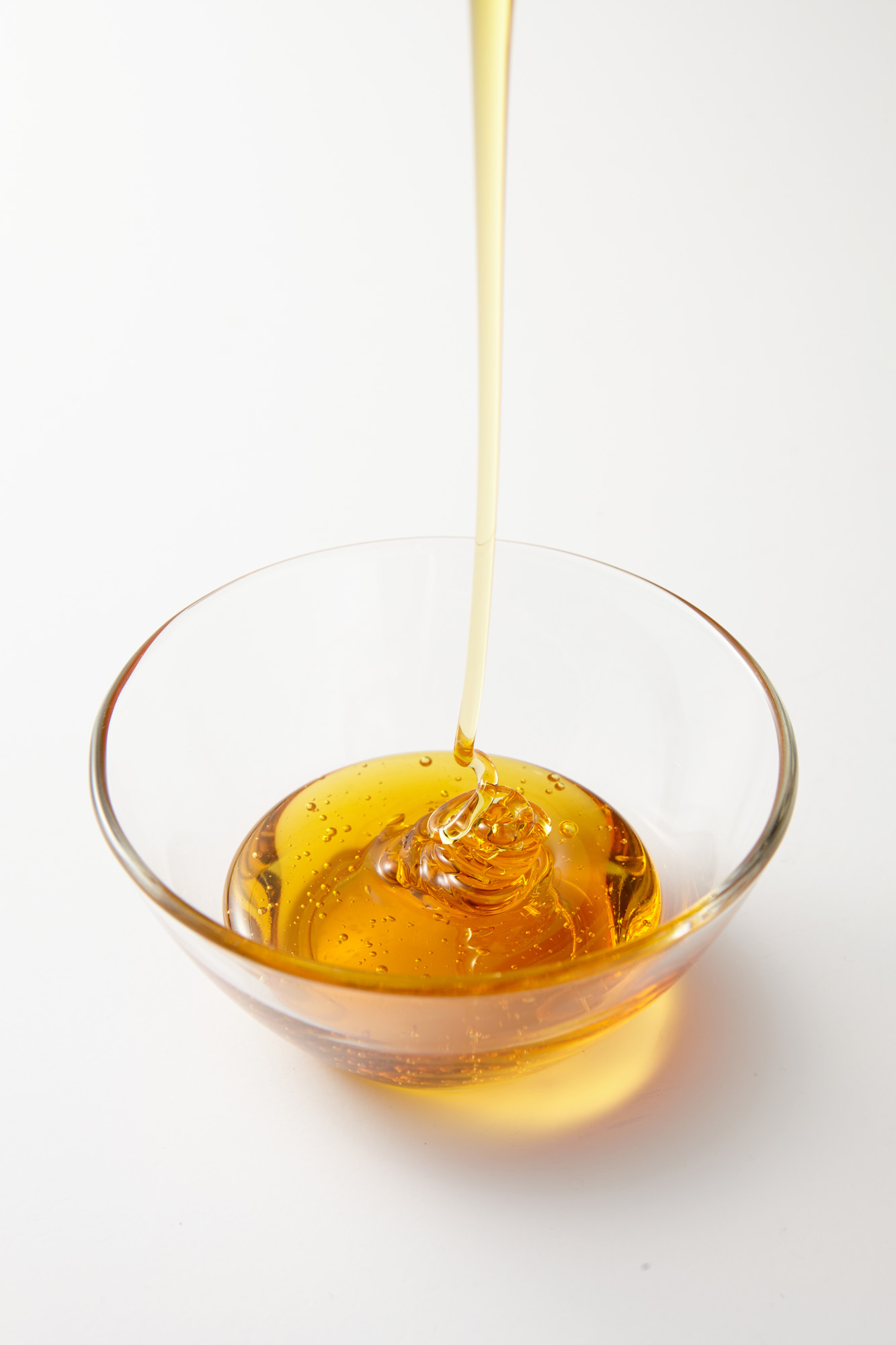
Jocheong (rice syrup)

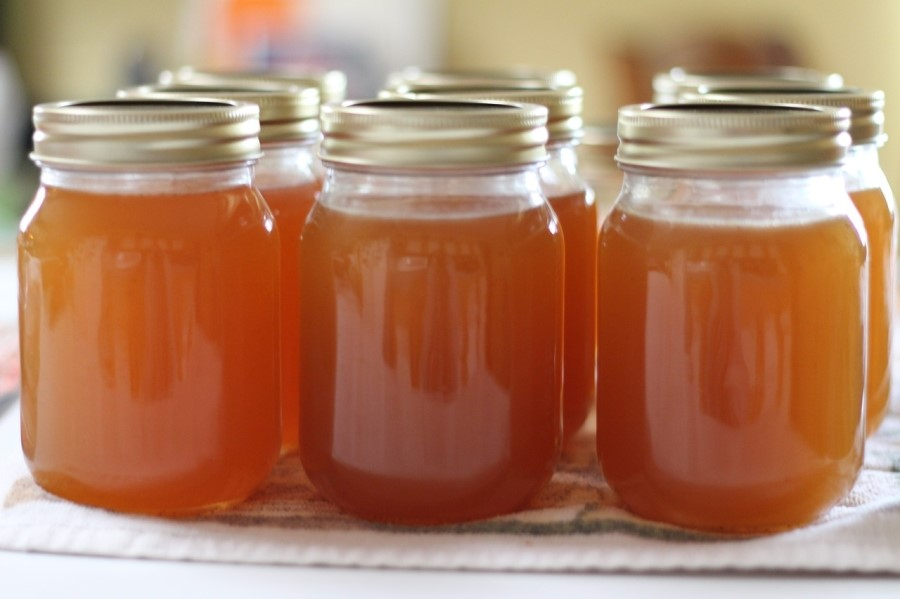
Maesil-cheong (plum syrup)

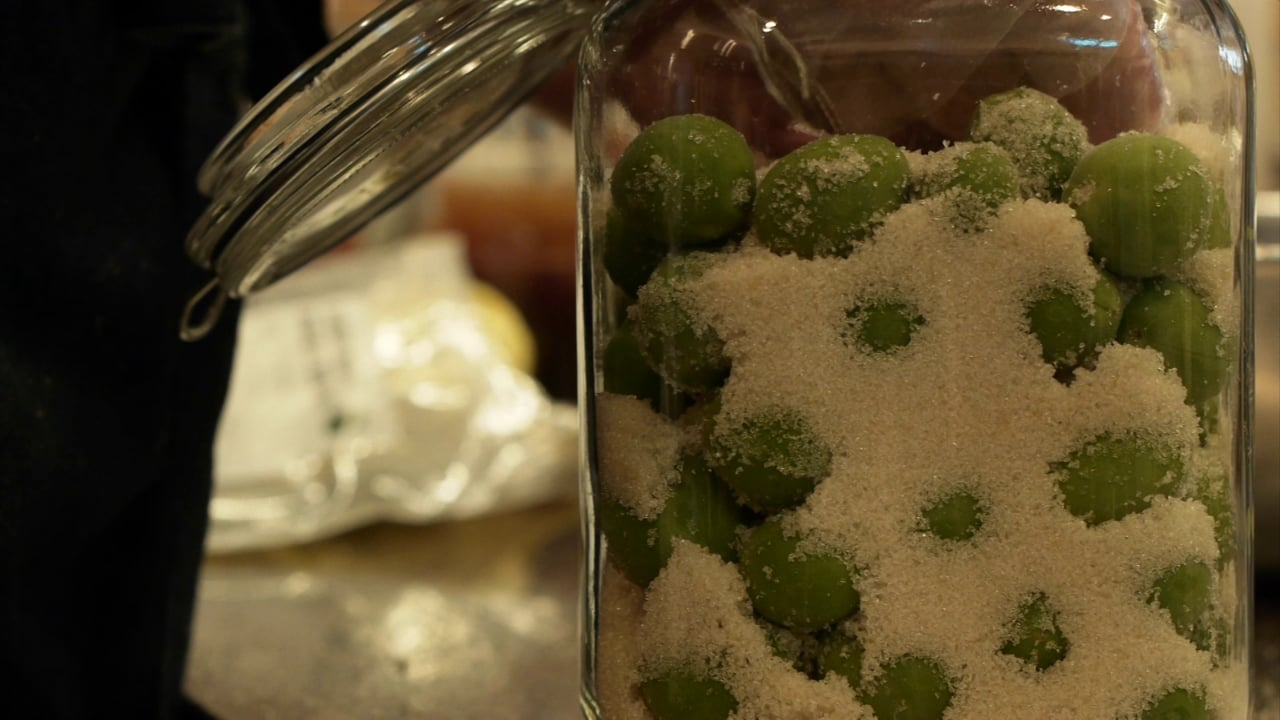
Preparing maesil-cheong

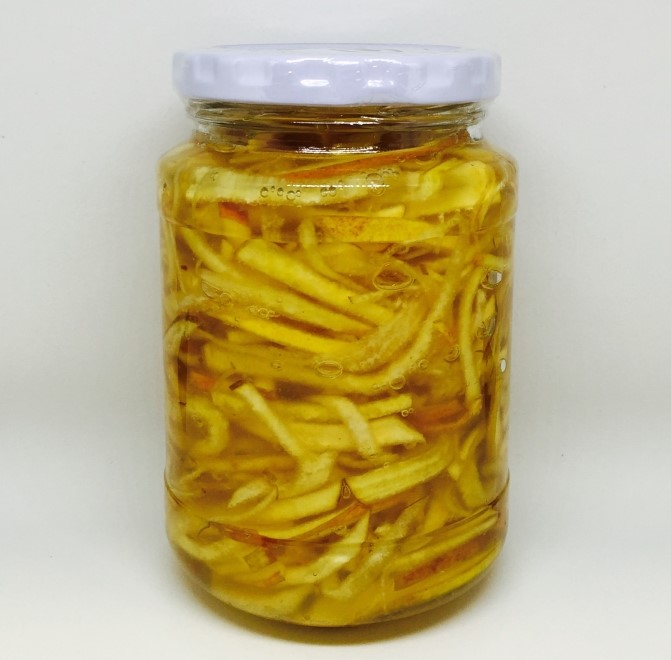
Mogwa-cheong (preserved quince)

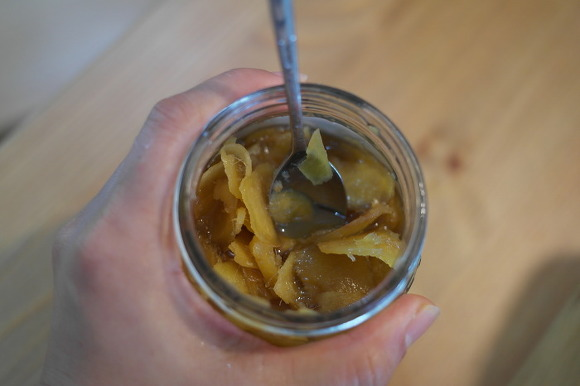
Saenggang-cheong (preserved ginger)

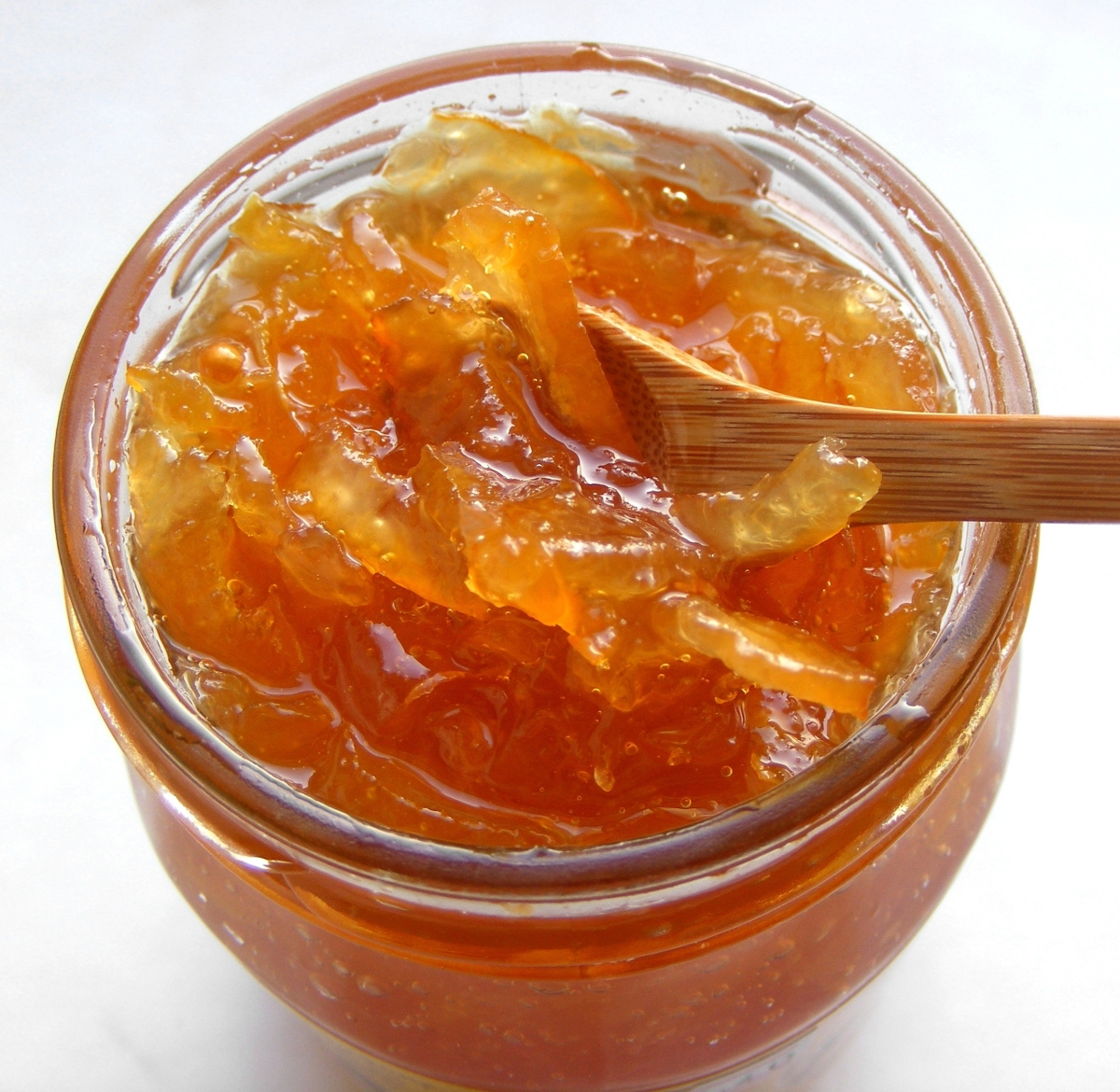
Yuja-cheong (preserved yuja)

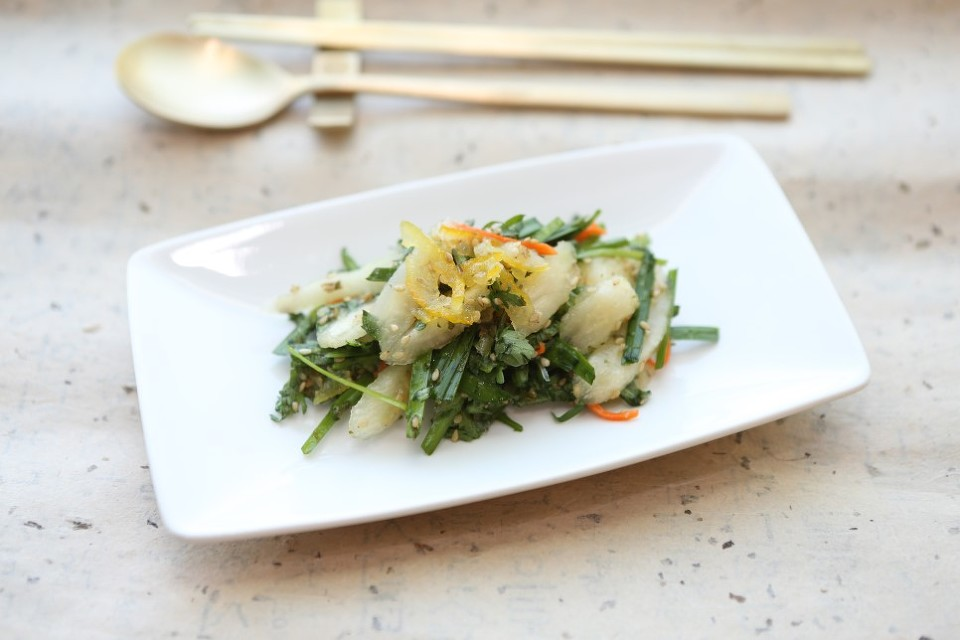
Deodeok-yuja salad, a lance asiabell root salad with a yuja-cheong-based dressing

== See also ==
- Fruit syrup
- List of spreads
- List of syrups
- Korean tea
- Yeot
