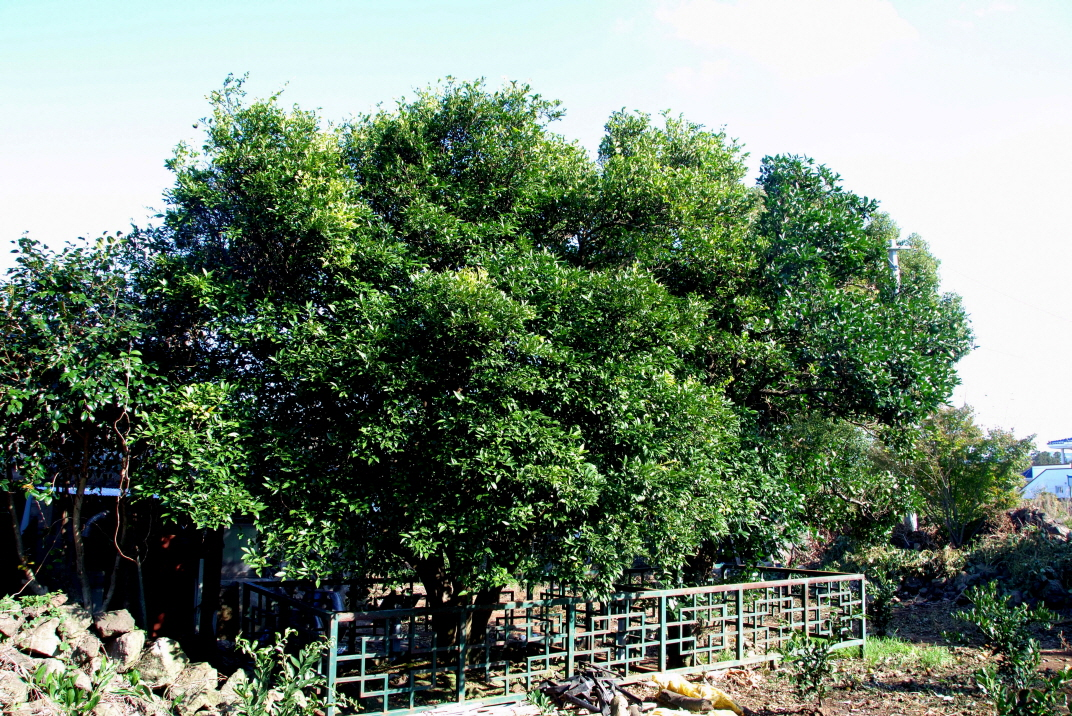
- Two-hundred-year-old Byeonggyul tree (濟州) in Doryeon-dong; Korean Natural Monument in Jeju

Scientific classification
- Kingdom: Plantae
- Clade: Tracheophytes
- Clade: Angiosperms
- Clade: Eudicots
- Clade: Rosids
- Order: Sapindales
- Family: Rutaceae
- Genus: Citrus
- Species: C. platymamma

Binomial name
- Citrus platymamma hort. ex Tanaka

= Byeonggyul =

Citrus fruit from Jeju, South Korea

Byeonggyul (병귤; [pʲʌŋ.ɡʲul]) in standard Korean and benjul (벤줄; [pen.dʑul]) in Jeju, Citrus platymamma, is a Korean citrus fruit native to Jeju Island.

== Etymology ==
Jeju benjul (벤줄) and Korean byeonggyul (병귤) are cognates. They share the same Hanja characters: byeong (甁, "bottle") and gyul (橘, "citrus fruit").

Tamnaji, a chronicle of Jeju Island published in 1653 by a Joseon governor, Yi Wŏnjin, mentions byeonggyul using the name byeolgyul (별귤; 別橘; lit. peculiar citrus). According to the author, the fruit is usually called byeonggyul (병귤; lit. bottle citrus), because its shape tapers towards the top and resembles an upside down jongji (종지; lit. tiny bowl).

== History ==
Two old byeonggyul trees in Doryeon-dong were designated as treasures of Jeju on 7 January 1998; However, one died on 5 October 2005. The remaining tree was designated as a Natural Monument of South Korea on 13 January 2011. It is presumed to be around 250 years old, and can be found at 21, Doryeon 6-gil, Jeju, Jeju Province (33.509321°N 126.582428°E).

In 2010, several 80-year-old byeonggyul trees were transplanted to Geummul orchard, an orchard once set out for growing citruses consumed at the court of the Joseon Dynasty. It disappeared with the end of the dynasty and was restored in 2010 by Seogwipo Agricultural Technology Center.

== Description ==
Genomic evidence has suggested that byeonggyul, sweet oranges, and key limes shared a common ancestor. Byeonggyul is known to be more resistant to cold, blight and insect attack than other related citrus fruits.

The thornless tree grows to 4–5 metres (13–16 ft) tall and around 2–2.5 metres (6 ft 7 in – 8 ft 2 in) wide. The dense, thin and low branches give the tree a shrubby appearance. Its leaves are ovate with pointy tips, around 6.5 centimetres (2.6 in) long and around 2.5 centimetres (0.98 in) wide. The flowers are formed of five white ovate petals.

Like that of the related citruses, the byeonggyul fruit has a fragrant dimpled rind. The yellow to yellow-orange fruit with an elongated basal portion and a bulbous end grows to 72 millimetres (2.8 in) long and 60 millimetres (2.4 in) broad. It weighs around 105 grams (3.7 oz).

== Uses ==
The flesh can be eaten raw, and the peel can be used fresh or dried, whole or zested. Fresh zest of a byeonggyul is used for tteok (rice cakes) and other Korean food as a spice or garnish, while dried peel is usually used for making tea. Byeonggyul tea was used as a home remedy to treat respiratory ailments, loss of appetite or minor digestive problems.

== See also ==
- Dangyuja
