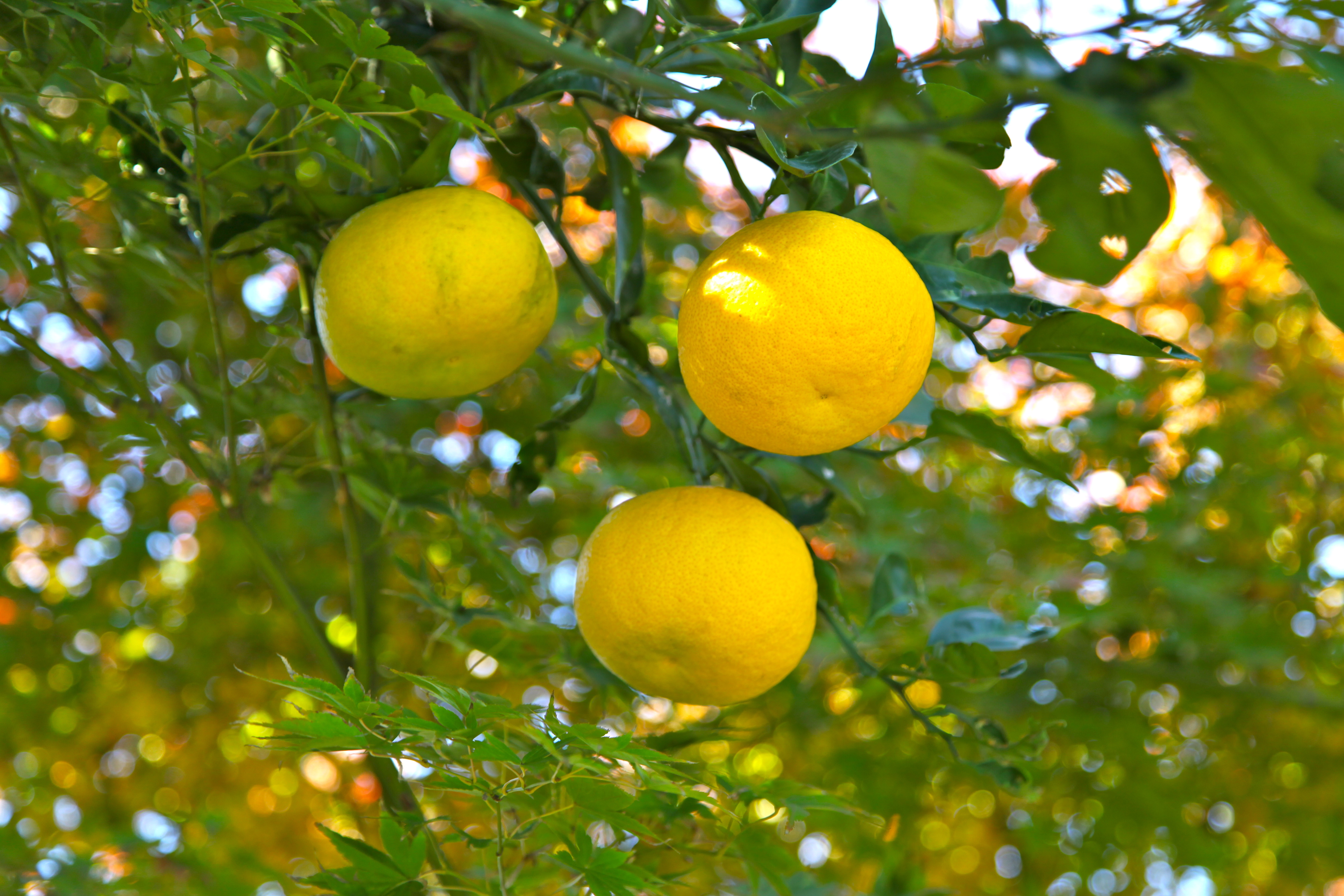

Scientific classification
- Kingdom: Plantae
- Clade: Tracheophytes
- Clade: Angiosperms
- Clade: Eudicots
- Clade: Rosids
- Order: Sapindales
- Family: Rutaceae
- Genus: Citrus
- Species: C. × junos

Binomial name
- Citrus × junos Siebold ex Yu.Tanaka

= Yuzu =

Citrus fruit and plant

Yuzu (Citrus × junos, from Japanese 柚子 or ユズ; /ˈjuːzuː/) is a citrus fruit and plant in the family Rutaceae of Chinese origin. Yuzu has been cultivated mainly in East Asia, though it has also recently been grown in New Zealand, Australia, Spain, Italy, and France.

It is believed to have originated in central China as an F1 hybrid of the mangshanyeju (Chinese: 莽山野橘) subspecies of mandarin orange and the ichang papeda.

== Description ==
This fruit resembles a yellow clementine with uneven skin and can be either yellow or green depending on the degree of ripeness. Yuzu fruits, which are very aromatic, typically range between 5.5 and 7.5 cm (2 1/8 and 3 in) in diameter but can be as large as the more familiar grapefruit (up to 10 cm or 4 in, or larger).Yuzunone, an odor-active volatile identified in yuzu peel oil, has been found to contribute greatly to yuzu's distinctive aroma.

Yuzu forms as an upright shrub or small tree, which commonly has many large thorns. Leaves are notable for a large, leaf-like petiole, resembling those of the related makrut lime and ichang papeda, and are heavily scented.

Yuzu closely resembles sudachi (Citrus sudachi, a Japanese citrus from Tokushima Prefecture, a yuzu–mandarin orange cross) in many regards, though, unlike the sudachi, yuzu eventually ripen to an orange color and there are subtle differences between the flavors of the fruit.

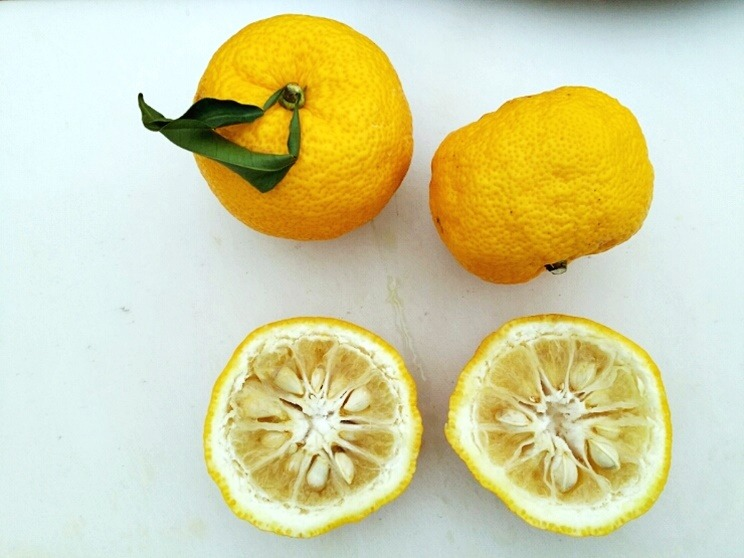
Citrus × junos fruits and cross sections

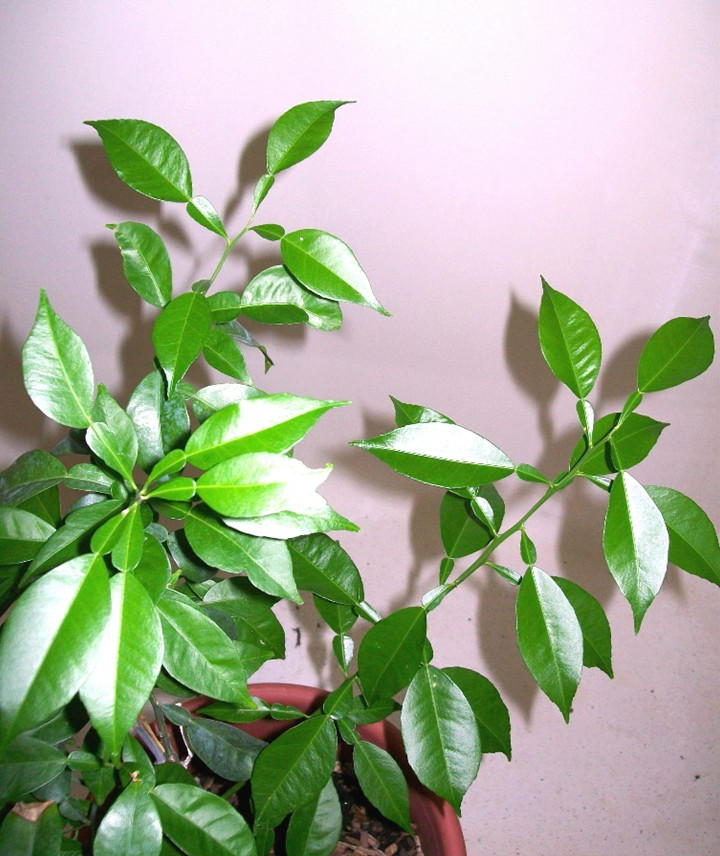
The leaves have large leaf-like petioles.

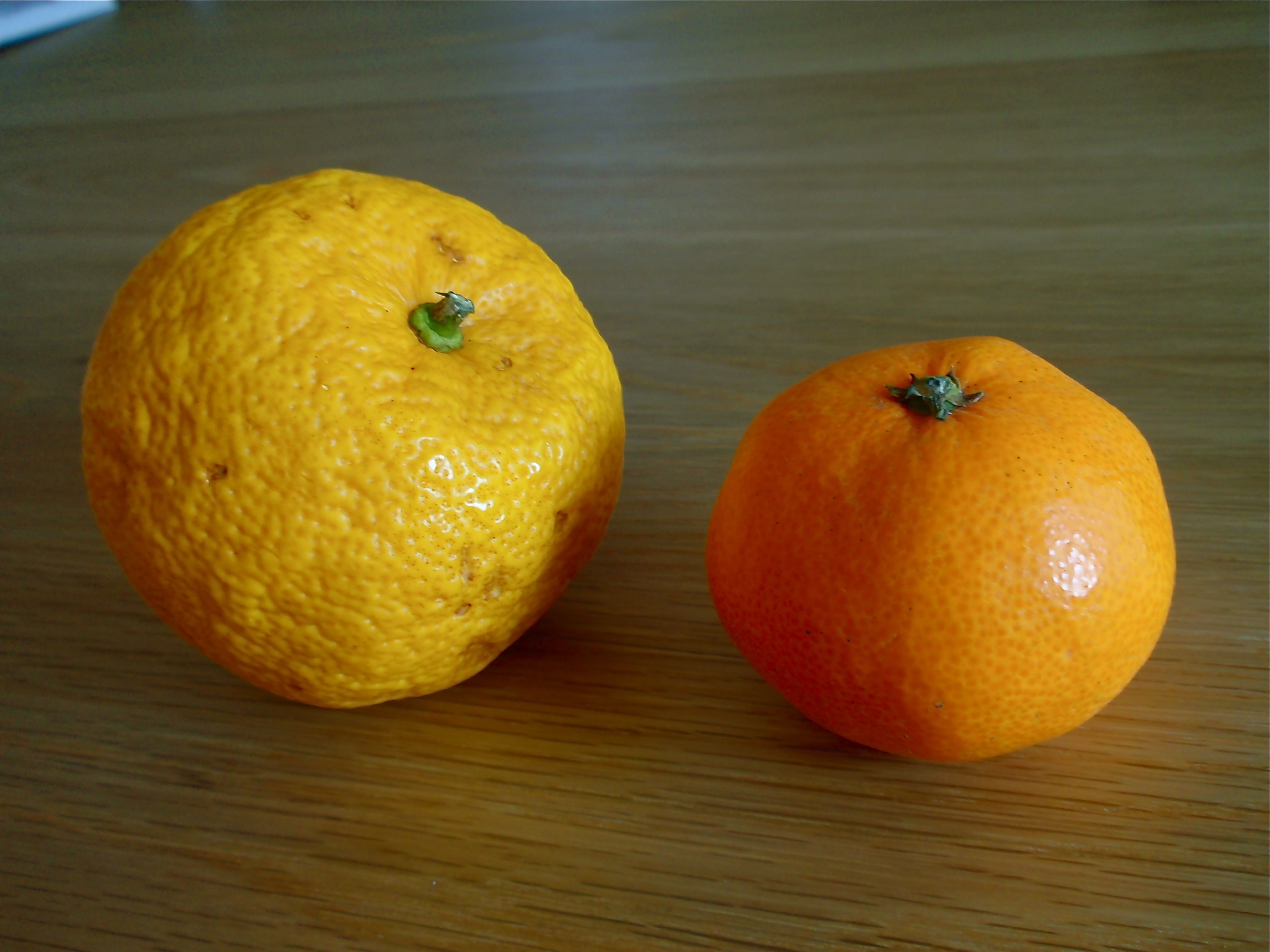
Yuzu (left) compared to mandarin orange (right)

== Cultivation ==
The yuzu originated and grew wild in Tibet and central China. It was introduced to Japan and Korea during the Tang dynasty and is still cultivated there. It grows slowly, generally requiring ten years to fruit. To shorten the duration to fruiting, it may be grafted onto karatachi (P. trifoliata). It is unusual among citrus plants in being relatively frost-hardy, due to its cold-hardy Ichang papeda ancestry, and can be grown in regions with winters as low as −7 °C (19 °F) where more sensitive citrus would not thrive.

== Varieties and similar fruits ==
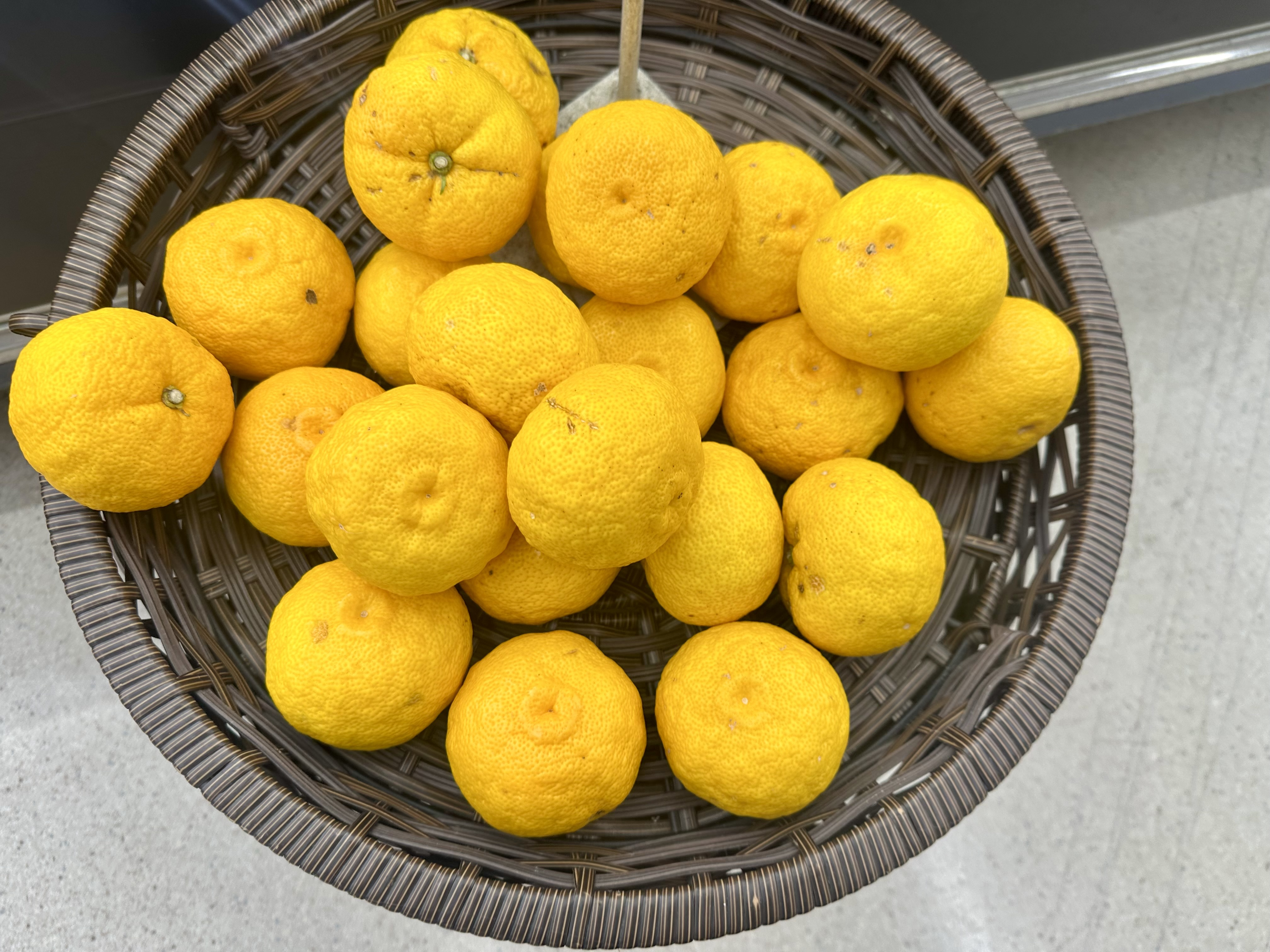
Yuzu for sale in Kanagawa

A. Varieties

- Hana, also called hana yuzu (花柚子, 花ゆず; lit. 'flower yuzu') or Hanayu, with smaller fruits (50gr+), with thinner skin, a little lighter aroma, and smaller thorns. It has two varieties, one with the usual bumpy skin, and one with smooth skin also having slightly less bitterness.
- Kito, an old Japanese variety
- Komatsu Sadao, one of the most famous for its aroma
- Shi shi, a variety with very large fruit (up to 20 cm) and knobby skin, called shishi yuzu (獅子柚子; lit. 'lion yuzu').
- Tada Nishiki, a variety without seeds, but a little inferior aroma
- No 1, a french cultivar with large thorns and large production of medium fruits, very similar to the standard,
- No 3, a french cultivar with smaller thorns and medium sized fruits,
- No 4, a french cultivar with large thorns and large fruits, up to 10 cm, earlier ripening (October), slightly sweeter.
- No 5, a french cultivar with less to no thorns and medium sized fruits,

B. Similar

- Dangyuja, a Korean citrus fruit from Jeju Island, is often considered a type of yuzu due to its similar shape and flavor, but it is genetically a variety of pomelo.
- Yuko, a sweet variety of yuzu known as the yuko, probably an ichangensis x reticula. During the 1970s and 1980s became severely endangered. A major attempt has been made to revive this varietal in southern Japan.

== Use ==
=== East Asia ===
==== Culinary use ====
===== Japan =====
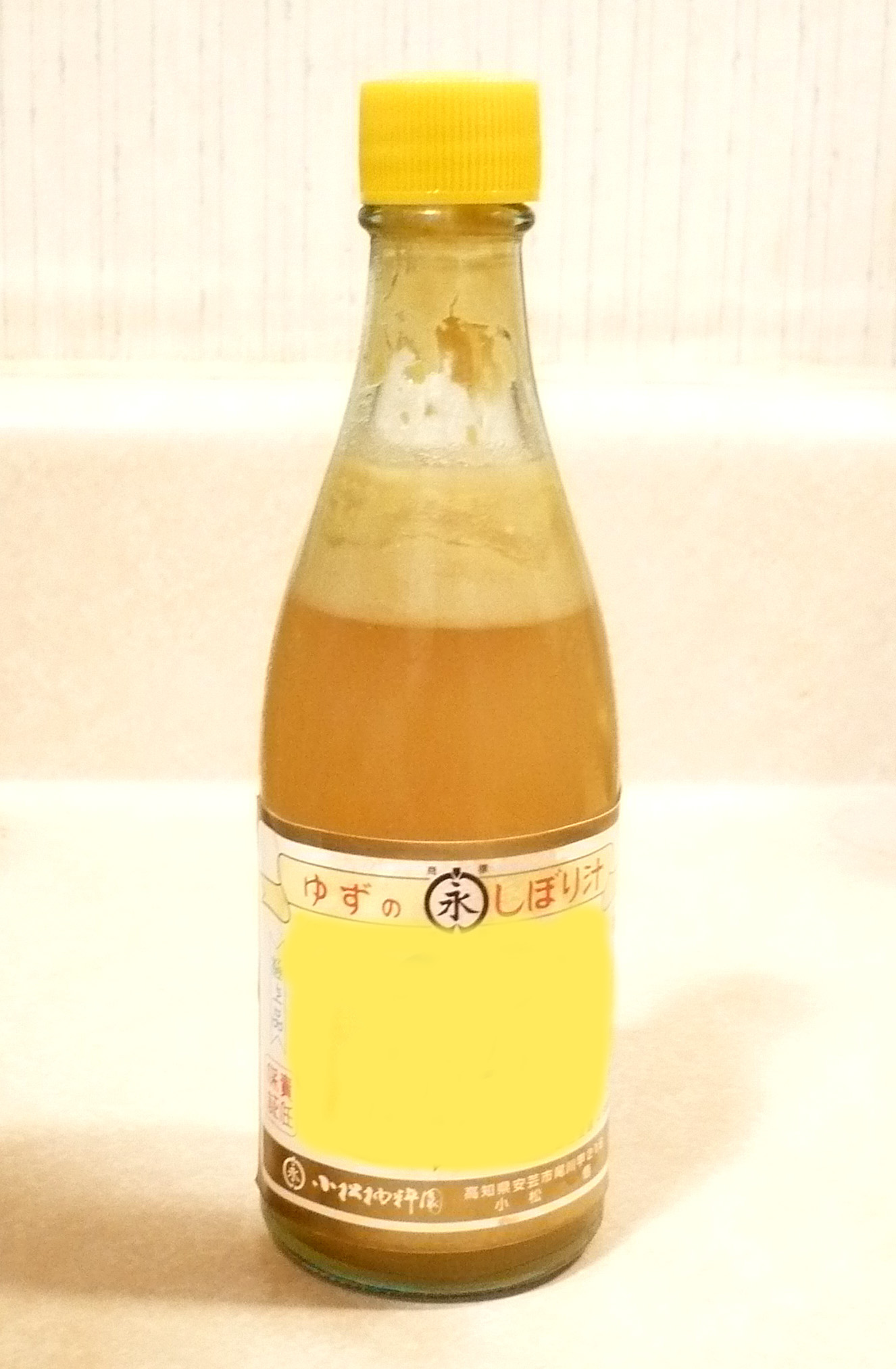
A bottle of yuzu vinegar

Yuzu's domestic production is about 27,000 tons (2016). Though rarely eaten as a fruit, yuzu is a common ingredient in Japanese cuisine, where the aromatic zest (outer rind) and the juice are used much in the same way that lemons are used in other cuisines. The yuzu's flavor is tart and fragrant, closely resembling that of the grapefruit, with overtones of mandarin orange.

It is an integral ingredient (along with sudachi, daidai, and other similar citrus fruits) in the citrus-based sauce ponzu, and yuzu vinegar is also produced. Yuzu is often combined with honey to make yuzu hachimitsu (柚子蜂蜜), a kind of syrup that is used to make yuzu tea (柚子茶), or as an ingredient in alcoholic drinks such as the yuzu sour (柚子サワー). Yuzu kosho (also yuzukosho, literally 'yuzu and pepper') is a spicy Japanese sauce made from green or yellow yuzu zest, green or red chili peppers, and salt.

It is used to make liquor (such as yuzukomachi, 柚子小町) and wine. Slivered yuzu rind is used to garnish a savory, salty egg-pudding dish called chawanmushi, as well as miso soup. It is often used along with sudachi and kabosu. Yuzu is used to make various sweets, including marmalade and cake. It is used extensively in the flavoring of many snack products, such as Doritos.

===== Korea =====
In Korean cuisine, yuja is most commonly used to make yuja-cheong (유자청, yuja marmalade) and yuja tea. Yuja-cheong can be made by sugaring peeled, depulped, and thinly sliced yuja, and yuja-cha, yuja tea, can be made by mixing hot water with yuja-cheong. Yuja-hwachae (유자화채, yuja punch), a variety of hwachae (fruit punch), is another common dessert made with yuja. Yuja is also a common ingredient in Korean-style Western food, such as salads.

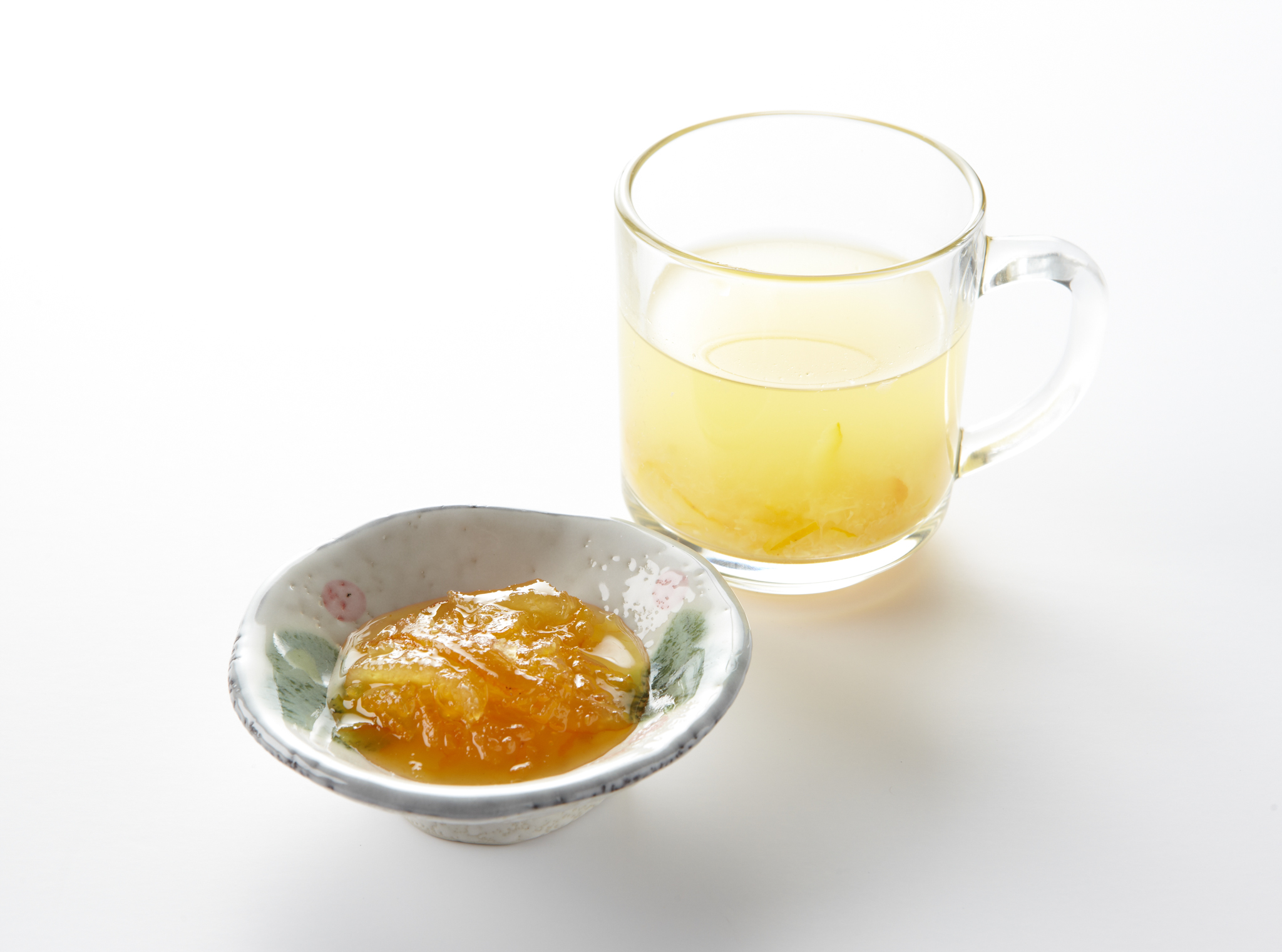
Yuja tea and yuja-cheong

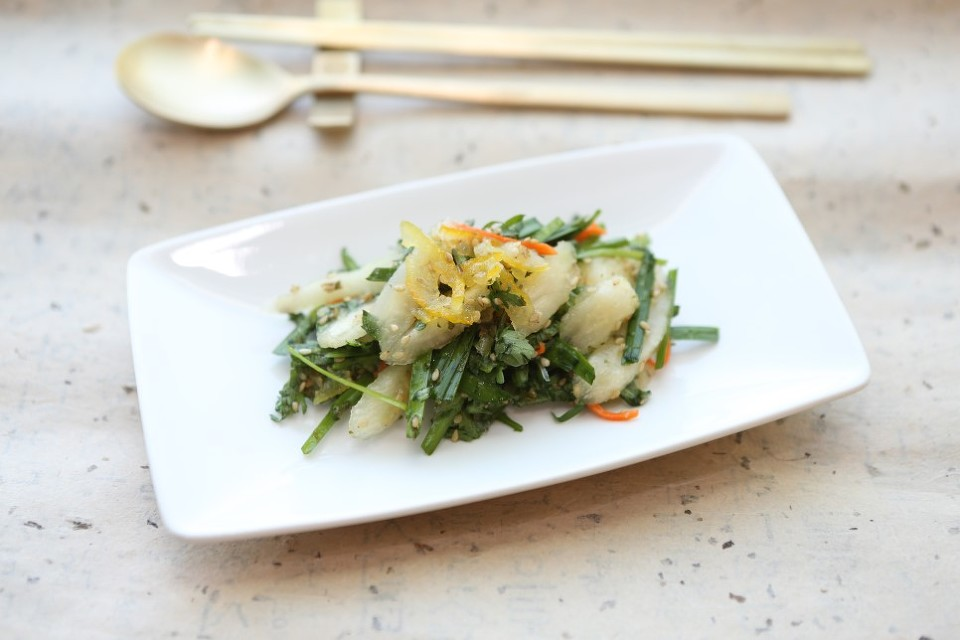
Deodeok yuja salad

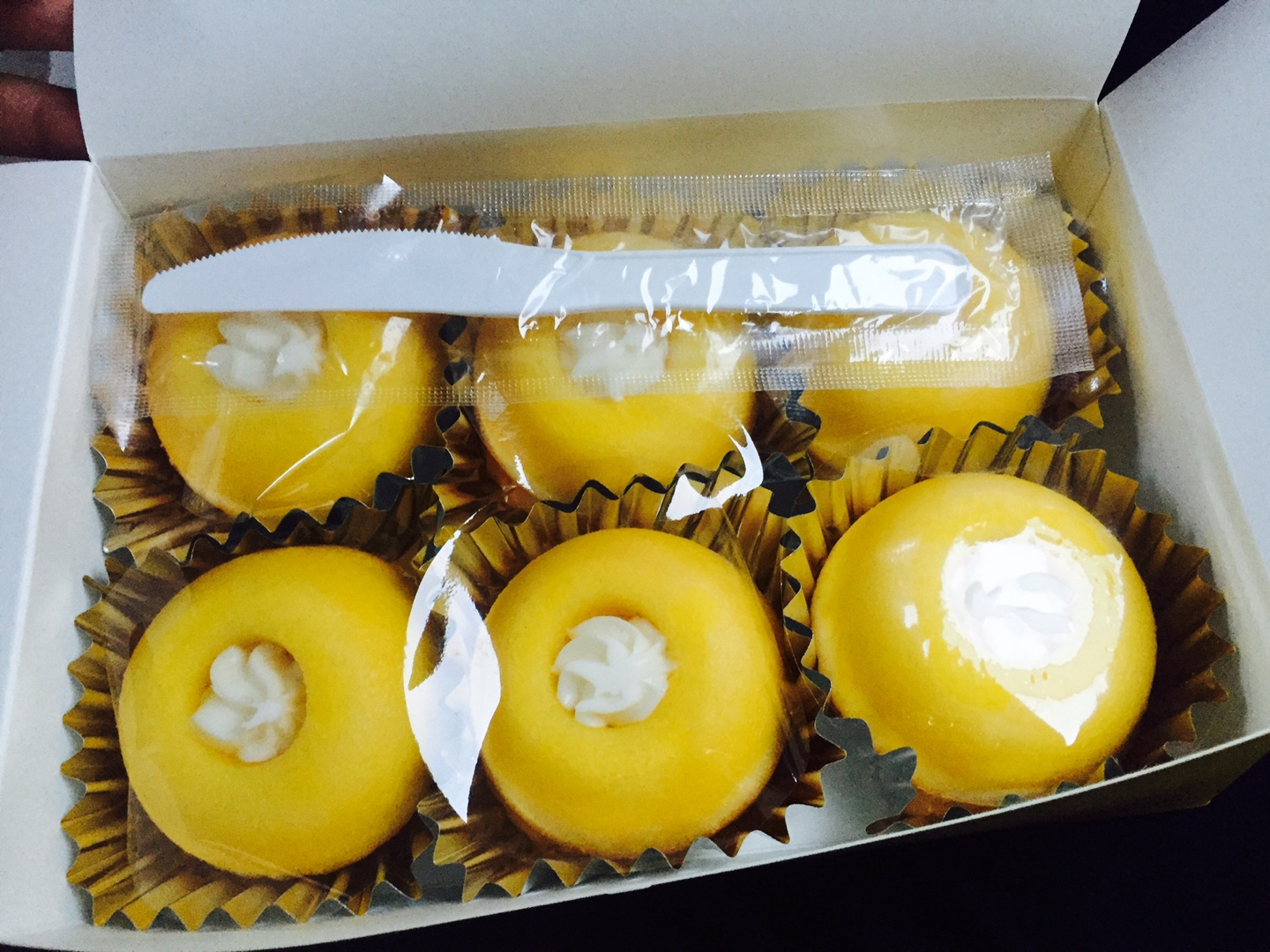
Yuja bread sold in Yeosu

==== Other uses ====
===== Yuzu baths =====
Yuzu is also known for its characteristically strong aroma, and the oil from its skin is marketed as a fragrance. In Japan, bathing with yuzu on Tōji, the winter solstice, is a custom that dates to at least the early 18th century. Whole yuzu fruits are floated in the hot water of the bath, sometimes enclosed in a cloth bag, releasing their aroma. The fruit may also be cut in half, allowing the citrus juice to mingle with the bathwater. The yuzu bath, known commonly as yuzu yu (柚子湯), but also as yuzu buro (柚子風呂), is said to guard against colds, treat the roughness of skin, warm the body, and relax the mind.

===== Use as wood =====
The body of the taepyeongso, a Korean traditional oboe, close to the Chinese suona or the zurna, is often made from jujube, mulberry, or yuzu wood.

Use in fragrance

Because yuzu is a very aromatic fruit it is used often in perfumery its used in fragrances like lattafa khamra waha and other fragrances like fabulous yuzu

=== Elsewhere ===
As of the early 21st century, yuzu has been increasingly used by chefs in the United States and other Western nations, achieving notice in a 2003 article in The New York Times.

In the United States, the Department of Agriculture has a ban on the import of fresh yuzu (alongside most citrus plants) from abroad, including both the fruit and the trees. This is intended to prevent the spread of contagious diseases amongst domestic crops. However, as a result of its introduction to California in 1888, yuzu is cultivated and available for sale in the United States.

The Japanese J-Pop duo Yuzu, formed in 1997, was derived from the yuzu-flavored sherbet where Yūjin Kitagawa was eating at the time while discussing with his fellow Kōji Iwasawa on naming the duo.

== See also ==
- Calamansi
- Dangyuja
