= Mogwa-cha =

Korean quince tea

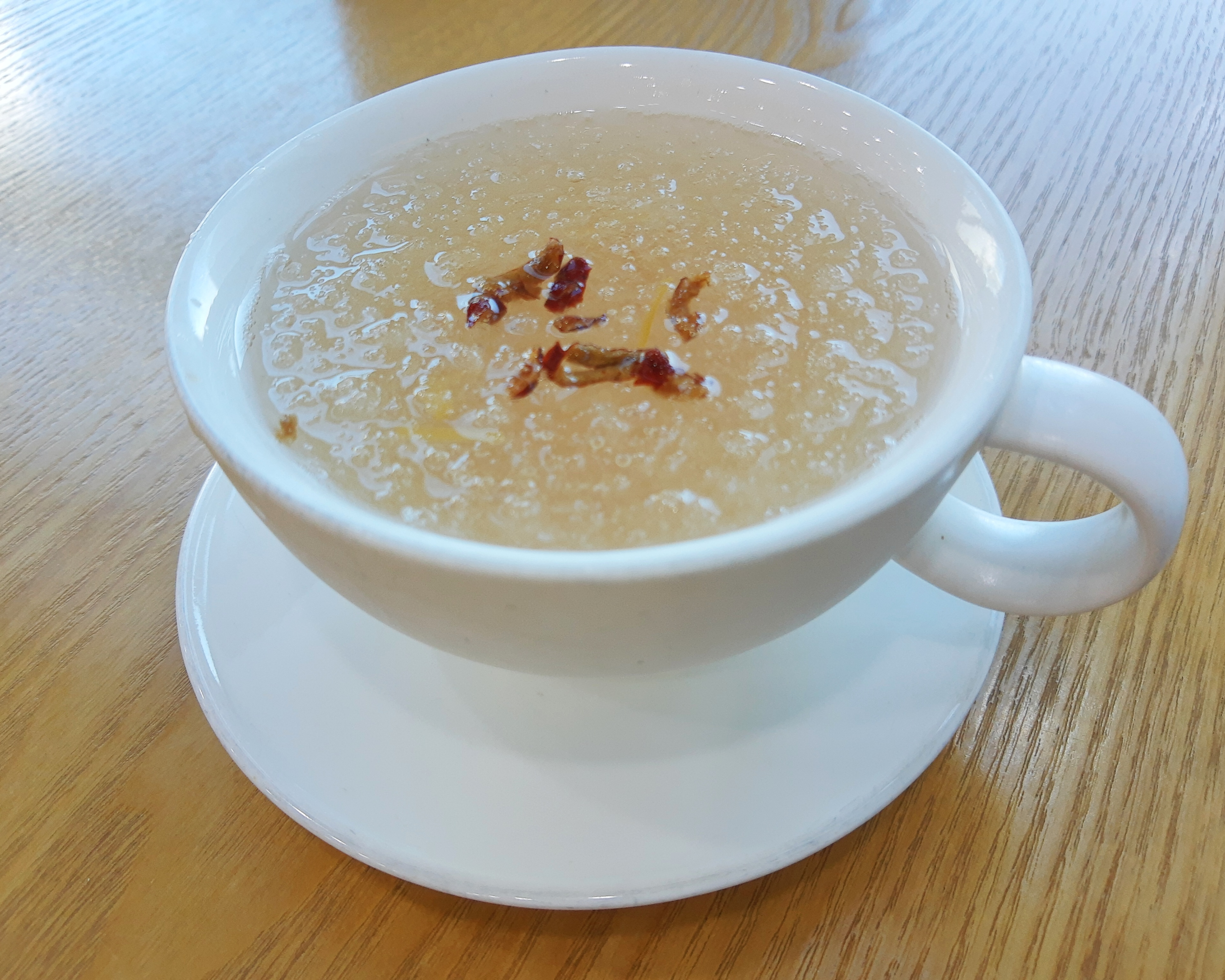
- Type: Herbal tea
- Origin: Korea
- Ingredients: Mogwa-cheong (preserved quince), dried quince, or powdered dried quince

Korean name
- Hangul: 모과차
- Hanja: (*木)瓜茶
- RR: mogwacha
- MR: mogwach'a
- IPA: [mo.ɡwa.tɕʰa]

Mogwa-cha (Korean: 모과차) or quince tea is a traditional Korean tea made with Chinese quince. Most commonly, mogwa-cha is prepared by mixing hot water with mogwa-cheong (quince preserved in honey or sugar). Alternatively, it can also be made by boiling dried quince in water or mixing powdered dried quince with hot water.

== See also ==
- Traditional Korean tea
