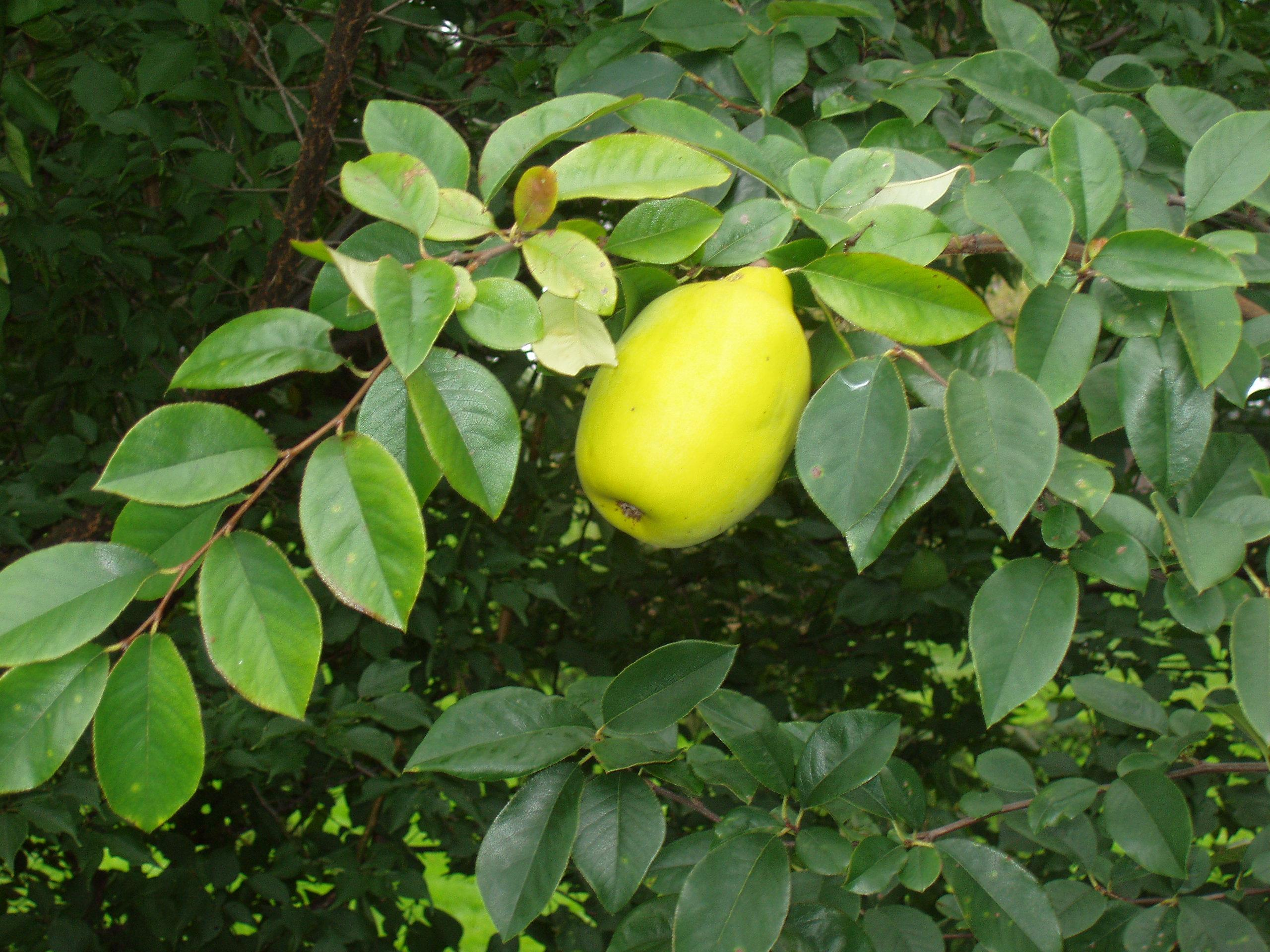
- Pseudocydonia sinensis

Scientific classification
- Kingdom: Plantae
- Clade: Tracheophytes
- Clade: Angiosperms
- Clade: Eudicots
- Clade: Rosids
- Order: Rosales
- Family: Rosaceae
- Subfamily: Amygdaloideae
- Tribe: Maleae
- Subtribe: Malinae
- Genus: Pseudocydonia; C.K.Schneid.
- Species: P. sinensis

Binomial name
- Pseudocydonia sinensis C.K.Schneid.

Synonyms
- Chaenomeles sinensis (Thouin) Koehne; Cydonia sinensis Thouin; Pyrus cathayensis Hemsl.; Pyrus sinensis (Thouin) Spreng.

= Pseudocydonia =

Genus of trees

Pseudocydonia sinensis or Chinese quince (Chinese: 木瓜; pinyin: mùguā) is a deciduous or semi-evergreen tree in the family Rosaceae, native to southern and eastern China. It is the sole species in the genus Pseudocydonia. Its hard, astringent fruit is used in traditional Chinese medicine and as a food in East Asia. Trees are generally 10–18 metres (33–59 ft) tall.

The tree is closely related to the east Asian genus Chaenomeles, and is sometimes placed as Chaenomeles sinensis, but lacks thorns and has single, not clustered, flowers. Chinese quince is further distinguished from quince, Cydonia oblonga, by its serrated leaves and lack of fuzz.

== Names ==
In China, both the tree and its fruit are called mùguā (木瓜), which also refers to papaya and the flowering quince (Chaenomeles speciosa). In Korea the tree is called mogwa-namu (모과나무) and the fruit mogwa (모과; from mokgwa (Korean: 목과; Hanja: 木瓜), the Korean reading of the Chinese characters). In Japan, both tree and fruit are called karin (花梨; rarely 榠樝) except in medicine where the fruit is called wa-mokka (和木瓜) from the Chinese and Korean names.

== Characteristics ==
Trees grow to 10–18 m tall, with a dense, twiggy crown. The leaves are alternately arranged, simple, 6–12 cm long and 3–6 cm broad, and with serrated margin. The flowers are 2.5–4 cm diameter, with five pale pink petals; flowering is in mid spring. The fruit is a large ovoid pome 12–17 cm long with five carpels; it gives off an intense, sweet smell when it ripens in late autumn.

== Uses ==
The fruit is hard and astringent, though it softens and becomes less astringent after a period of frost (via the process of bletting). It can be used to make jam, much like quince. In Korea, the fruit is used to make mogwa-cheong (preserved quince) and mogwa-cha (quince tea).

The fruit is also used in traditional Chinese medicine.

Chinese quince is also grown as an ornamental tree. In Haeju, North Korea two Chinese Quinces planted in 1910 are national monuments, being probably the tallest of specimens in the country.

== Gallery ==
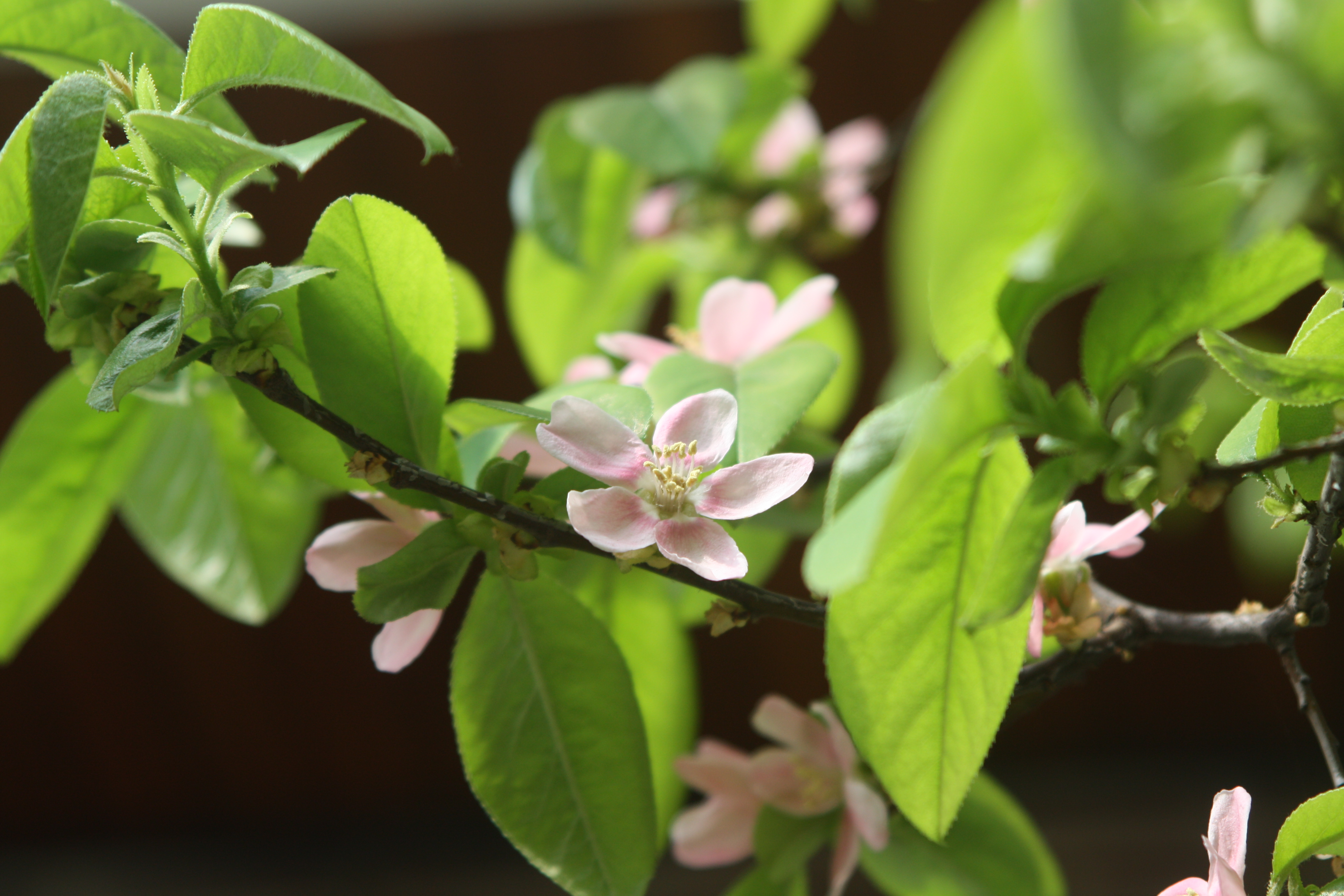

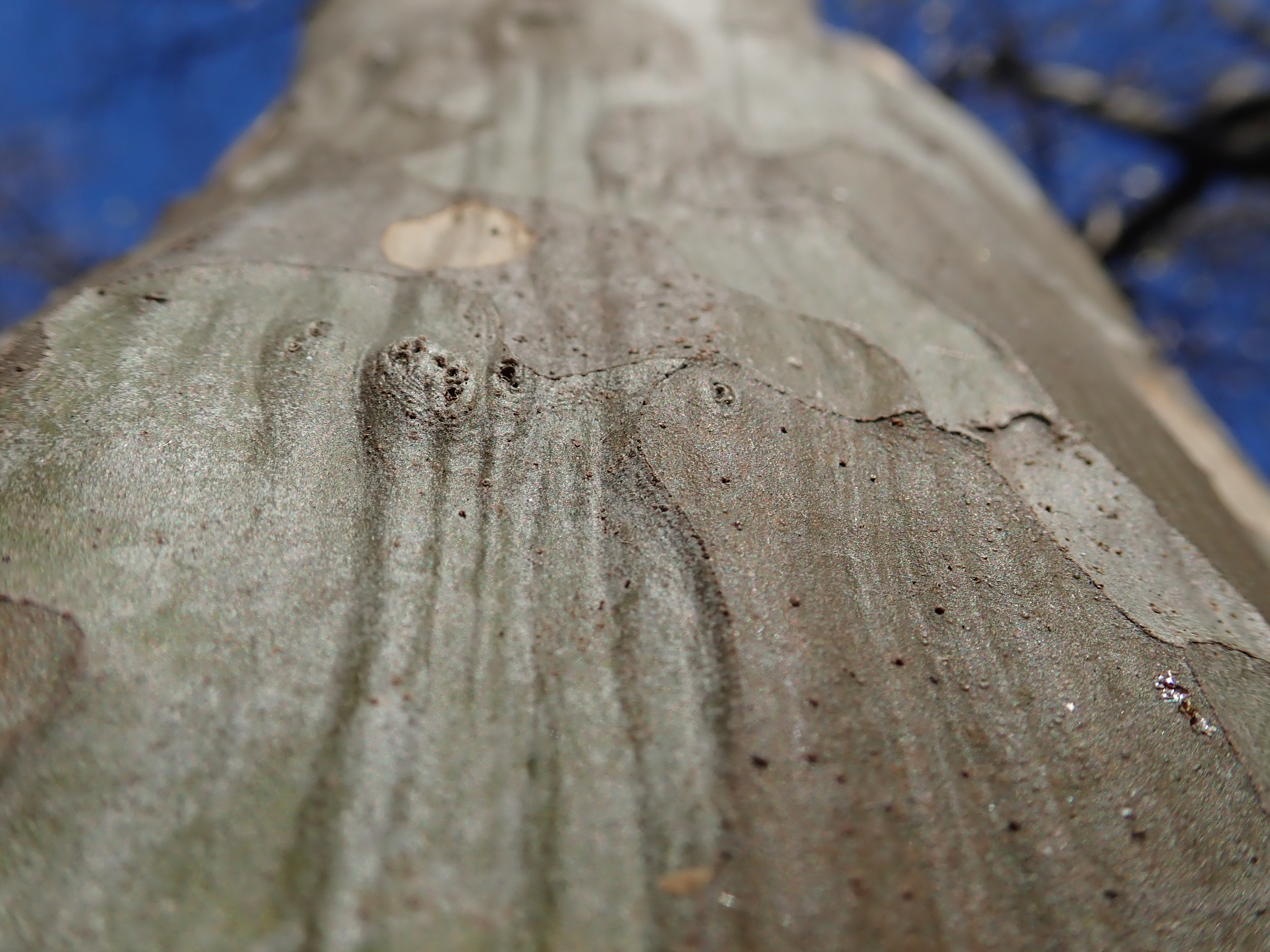
Trunk detail

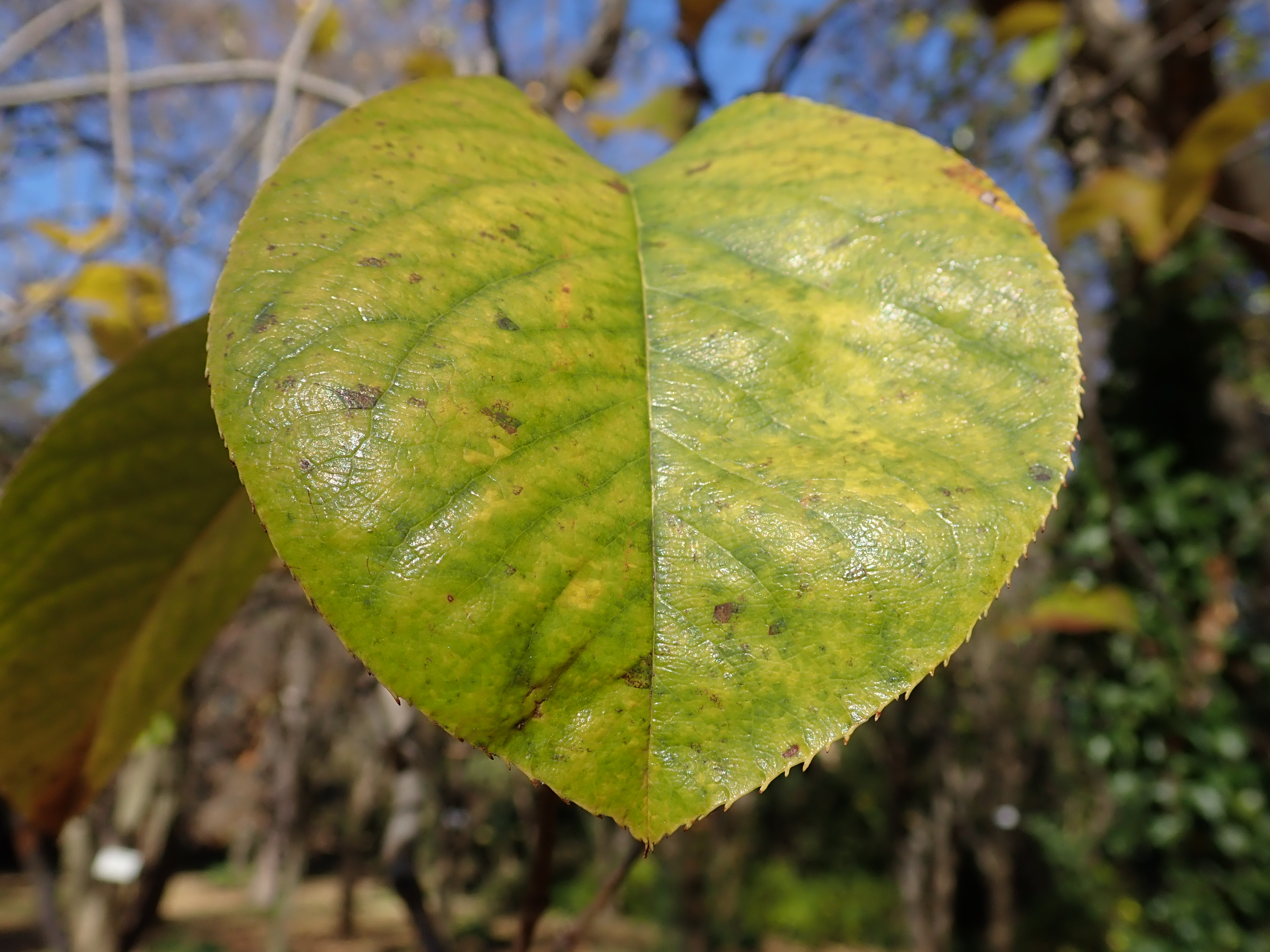
Leaf detail

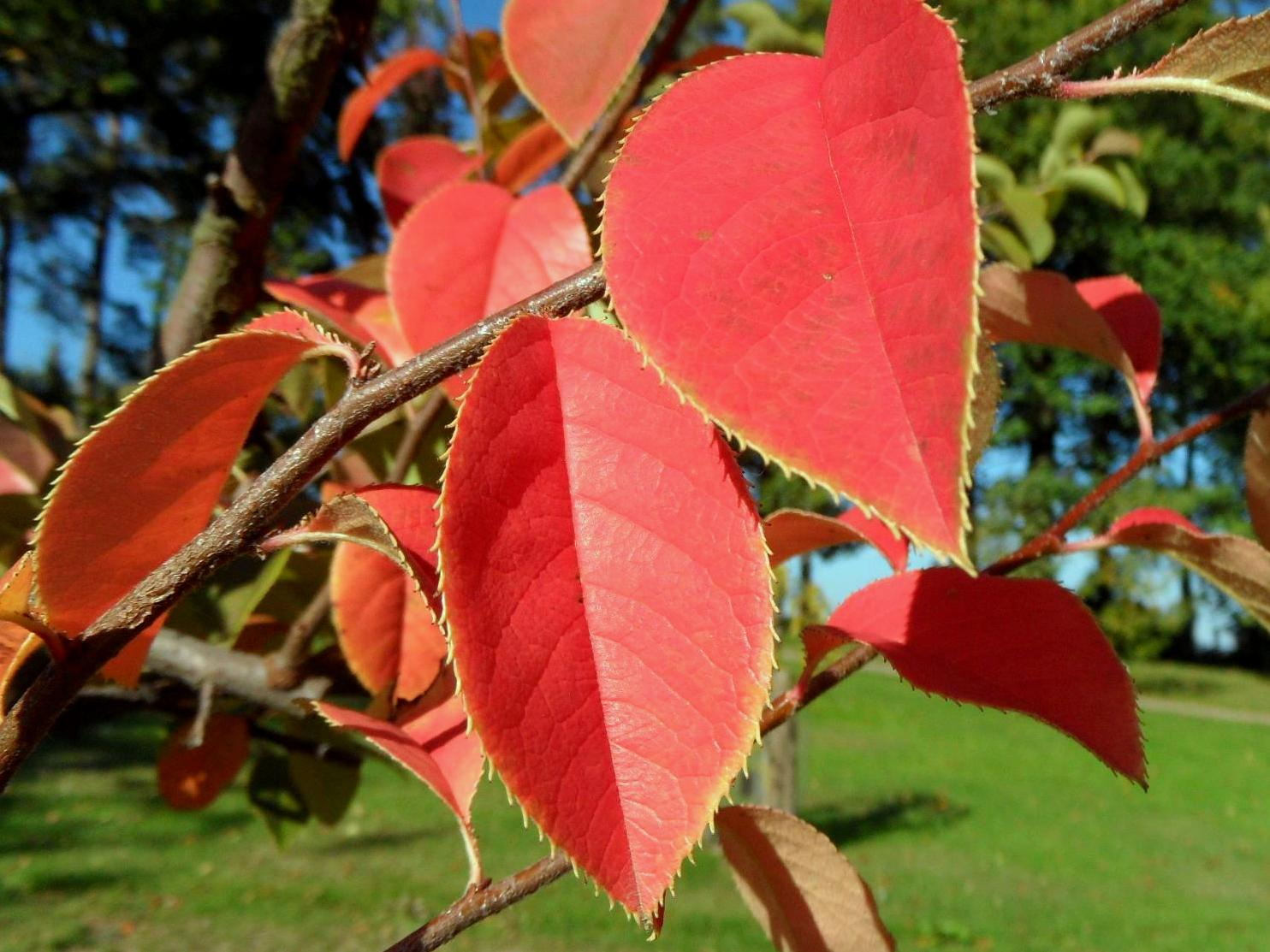
Autumn leaves

== See also ==
- Flowering quinces, genus Chaenomeles
- Quince (Cydonia oblonga)
