= Yuja tea =

Traditional Korean tea

Yuja-cha
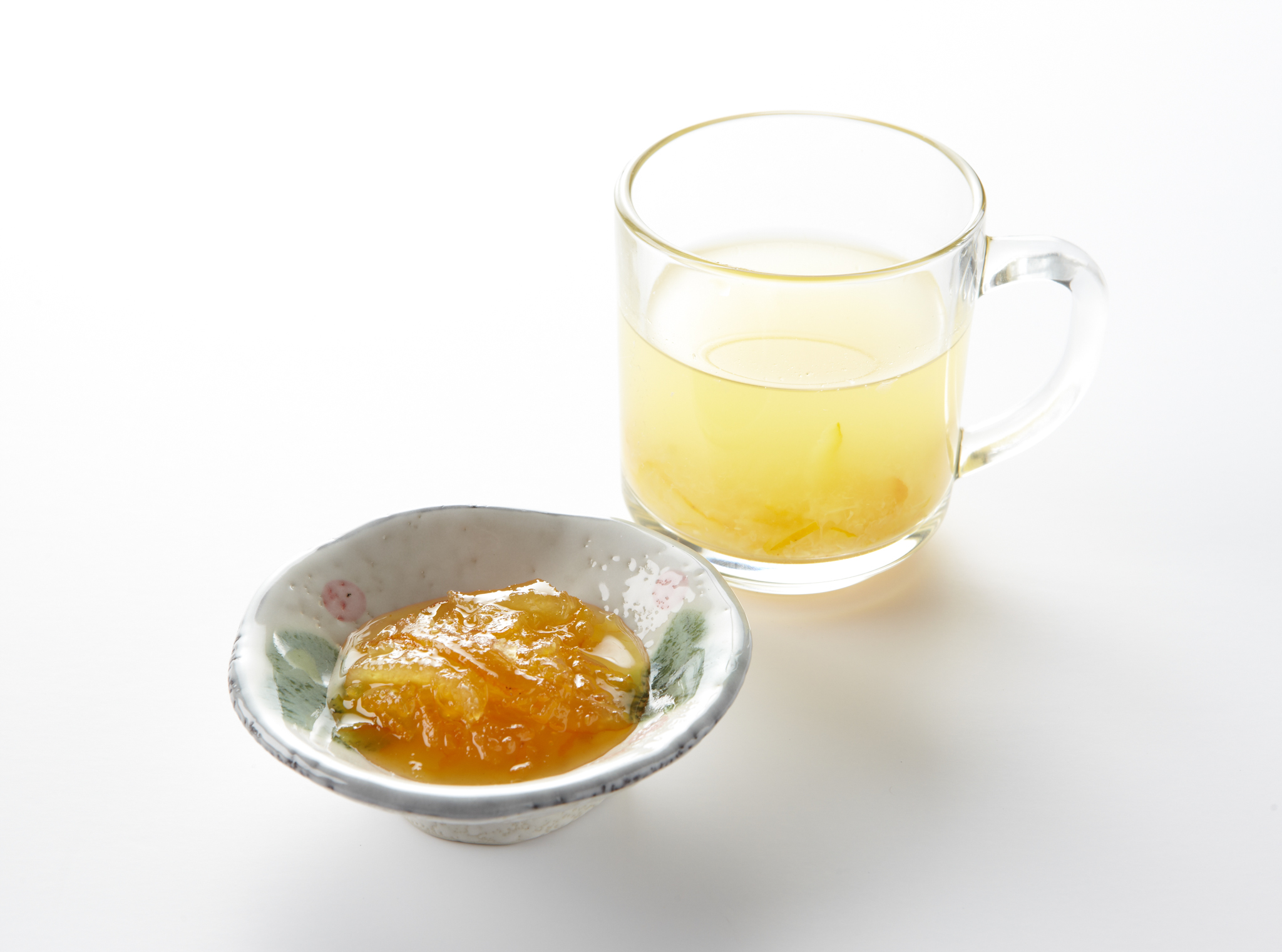
- Yuja-cha (yuzu tea) and yuja-cheong (yuzu marmalade)
- Type: Herbal tea
- Origin: Korea
- Ingredients: Yuja-cheong

Korean name
- Hangul: 유자차
- Hanja: 柚子茶
- RR: yujacha
- MR: yujach'a
- IPA: [ju.dʑa.tɕʰa]

Yuja-cha (Korean: 유자차), yuja tea or yuzu tea is a traditional Korean tea made by mixing hot water with yuja-cheong (yuzu marmalade). Yuja tea is popular throughout Korea, especially in the winter. This tea is created by curing yuzu into a sweet, thick, pulpy syrup. It does not contain caffeine. It is often sold in markets in large jars and used as a home remedy for the common cold.

Yuja tea is made from the yuzu fruit, known in Korea as yuja (유자), but commonly known outside of East Asia by its Japanese name yuzu (ユズ). Yuzu does not contain much juice, unlike other citrus fruits. They are able to cook in high temperatures without losing their tartness. Yuzu have a strong fragrance. Their scent comes from the zest, juices, and essential oils. Yuja tea is bittersweet. In addition, yuja tea is a preservative, so it can be left out on a shelf or counter.

== History ==
A man was carrying a shipment of yuzu trees from China to Korea until a storm came and hit his boat. The yuzu trees were destroyed, but some of the seeds went into the man's coat. As the man continued on Korea's soil, the seeds fell on the ground and grew into yuzu trees. Koreans saw the benefits the leaves had and used the yuzu leaves for the common cold by crushing it. Because of its bitter taste, they began to preserve the leaves in sugar and honey, which later developed into the yuja tea. King Sejong, who was responsible for the creation of the Korean Hangul script, was its greatest advocate.

== Names ==
Occasionally, the term yuja-cha can also be used to refer to the jarred yuzu marmalade used to make the tea. The drink's name is sometimes translated into "citron tea" or "honey citron tea" in English, but yuzu and citron are different citrus fruits. In Sinophone regions, the tea is referred to as "柚子茶", but the word 柚子 in Chinese refers to pomelo, not yuzu. The word "柚子茶" is a result of direct translation from the tea's Korean name.

== Preparation ==
Yuja tea can be made at home from scratch. The ingredients needed are citrus fruit (can be lemon or grapefruit) or yuzu, honey, and sugar. The first step is thoroughly clean the fruits. Next, cut the yuzu into thin slices and remove the seeds. Put the yuzu slices into a bowl, and mix with the honey and sugar. Lastly, put the mixture in a container and store it in a cool, dark area until the syrup is created (about six months). When ready, stir in 1-2 tablespoon of Yuja tea into hot water. The syrup of the yuja tea is also used in cocktails, spread for toast, or ice cream.

== Gallery ==
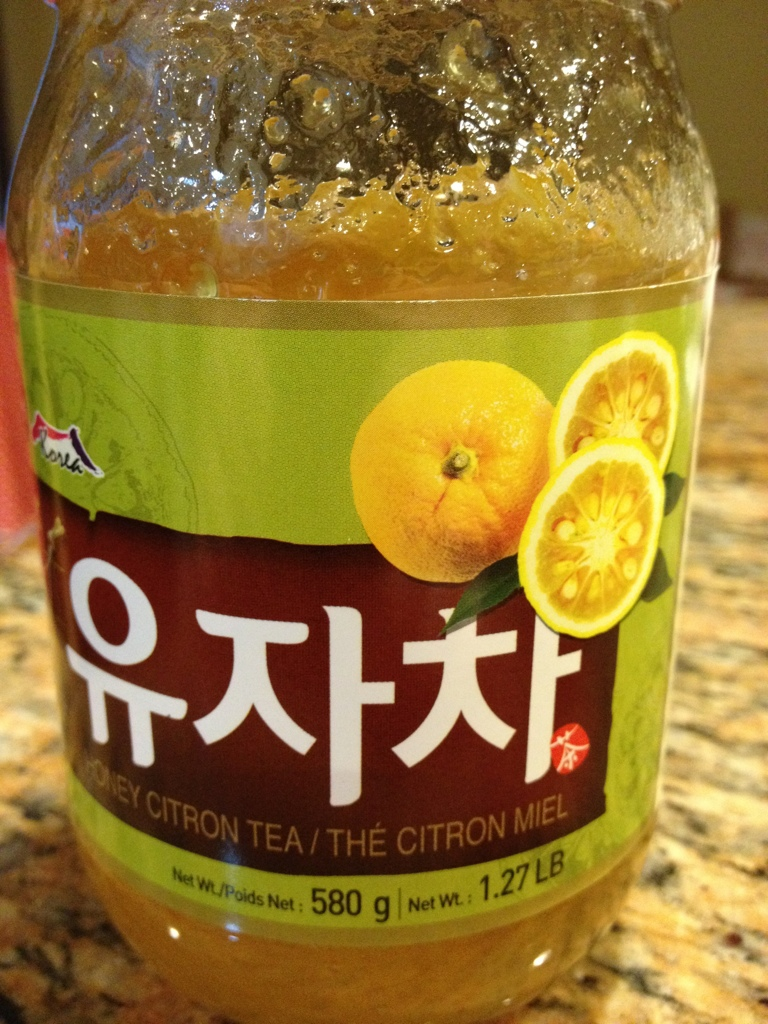
Bottled yuja-cha

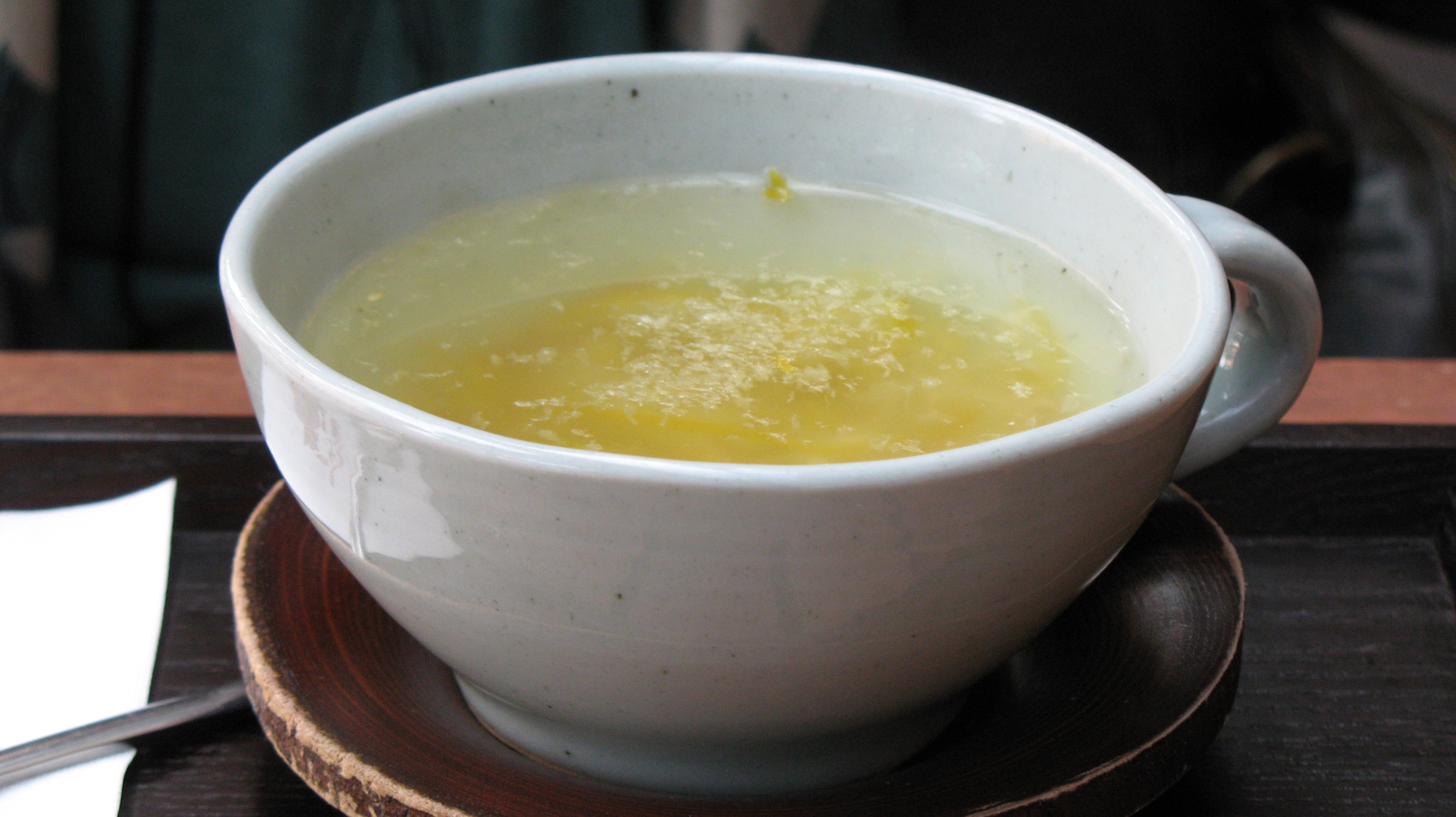
Korean yuja tea

== See also ==
- Traditional Korean tea
- Cheong (food)
