= Jeolpyeon =

Korean rice cake

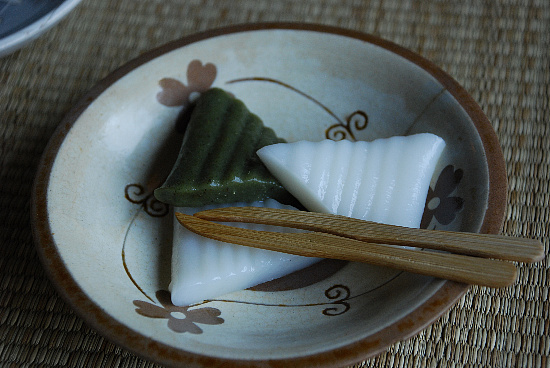
- Type: Tteok
- Place of origin: Korea
- Main ingredients: Rice flour

Korean name
- Hangul: 절편
- RR: jeolpyeon
- MR: chŏlp'yŏn
- IPA: [tɕʌl.pʰjʌn]

Jeolpyeon (Korean: 절편) is a type of tteok (rice cake) made of non-glutinous rice flour. Unlike when making siru-tteok or baekseolgi, the rice flour steamed in siru is pounded into a dough, divided into small pieces, and patterned with a tteoksal (rice cake stamp). The stamps can be wooden, ceramic, or bangjja (bronze), with various patterns including flowers, letters, or a cartwheel. When served, sesame oil is brushed over jeolpyeon.

== Varieties ==
If white seolgi is pounded, it becomes white jeolpyeon. Sometimes, the tteok is steamed and pounded with Korean mugwort, resulting in dark green ssuk-jeolpyeon (쑥절편). Another dark-green jeolpyeon, made with deltoid synurus, is called surichwi-jeolpyeon (수리취절편) and is traditionally served during the Dano festival. Pink-colored jeolpyeon, called songgi-jeolpyeon (송기절편), is made by pounding tteok with pine endodermis.

== Gallery ==
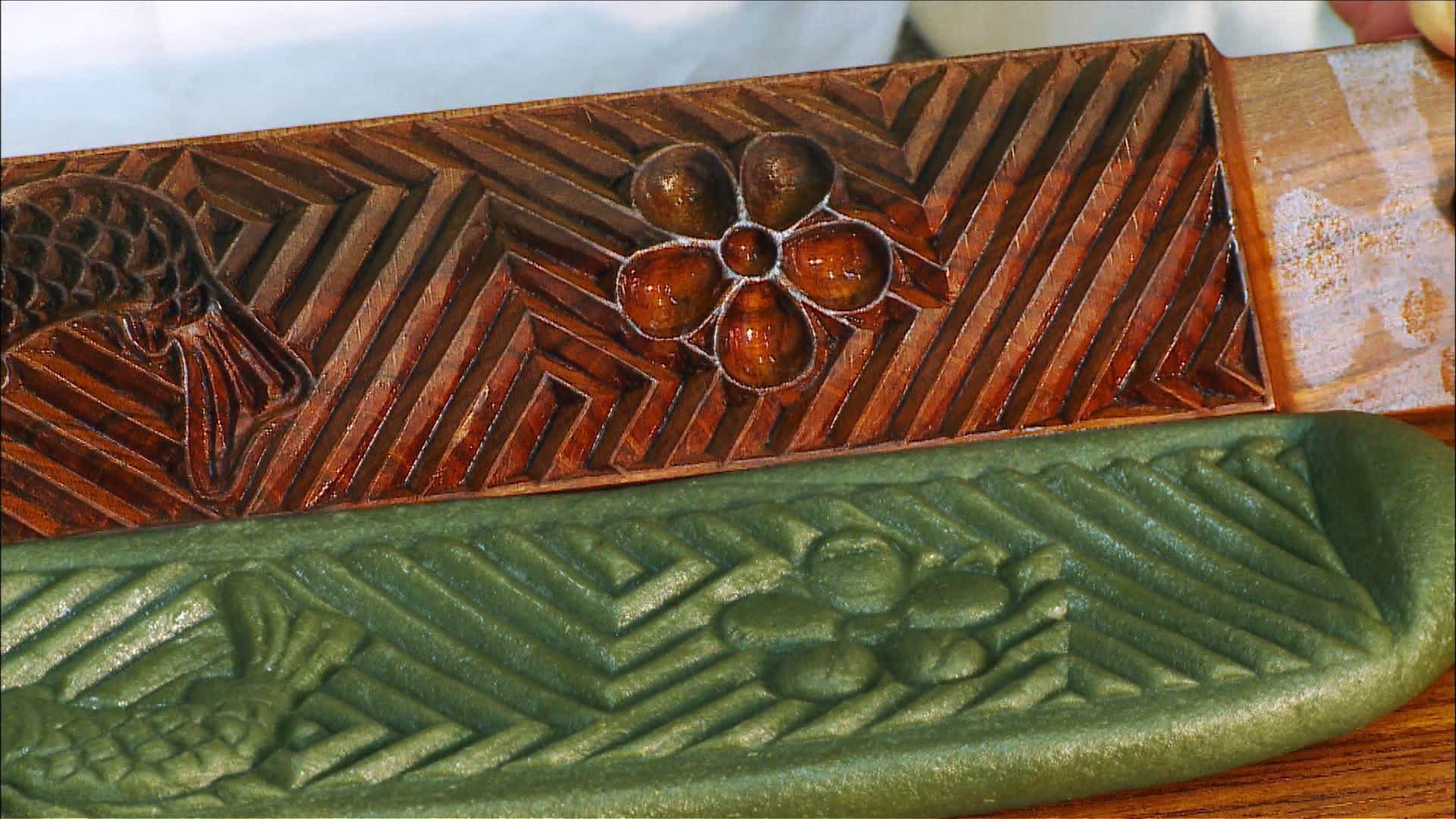
Jeolpyeon and tteoksal (patterned rice-cake stamp)

== See also ==
- Jeungpyeon
- Songpyeon
- Surichwi
