= Garae-tteok =

Long Korean rice cakes

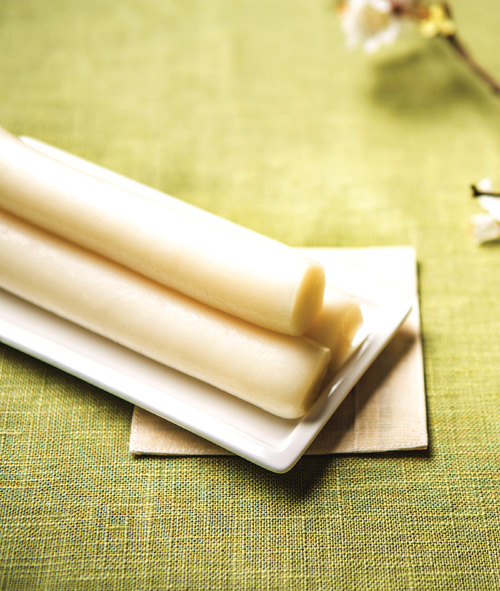
- Type: Tteok
- Place of origin: Korea
- Associated cuisine: Korean cuisine

Korean name
- Hangul: 가래떡
- RR: garaetteok
- MR: karaettŏk
- IPA: ka.ɾɛ.t͈ʌk̚

Garae-tteok (Korean: 가래떡) is a long, cylindrical tteok (rice cake) made with non-glutinous rice flour. Grilled garae-tteok is sometimes sold as street food. Thinly (and usually diagonally) sliced garae-tteok is used for making tteokguk (rice cake soup), a traditional dish eaten during the celebration of the Korean New Year. The world record of the longest garaetteok was achieved in Dangjin, South Korea in 2018, with 5,080 metres (16,670 ft).

== Preparation ==
It is traditionally made by steaming non-glutinous rice flour in siru (steamer), pounding it and rolling it between the palms and the table or rolling it between the palms. The method forms a thick, cylindrical rice cake, around 2.5 centimetres (0.98 in) in diameter. Hand-rolled garae-tteok is not uniform in size and has variations of thickness along its length.

Modern garae-tteok is usually made by extruding the steamed rice flour with garae-tteok machines.

== See also ==
- Tteok-bokki
