= Mujigae-tteok =

Korean colorful rice cake variety

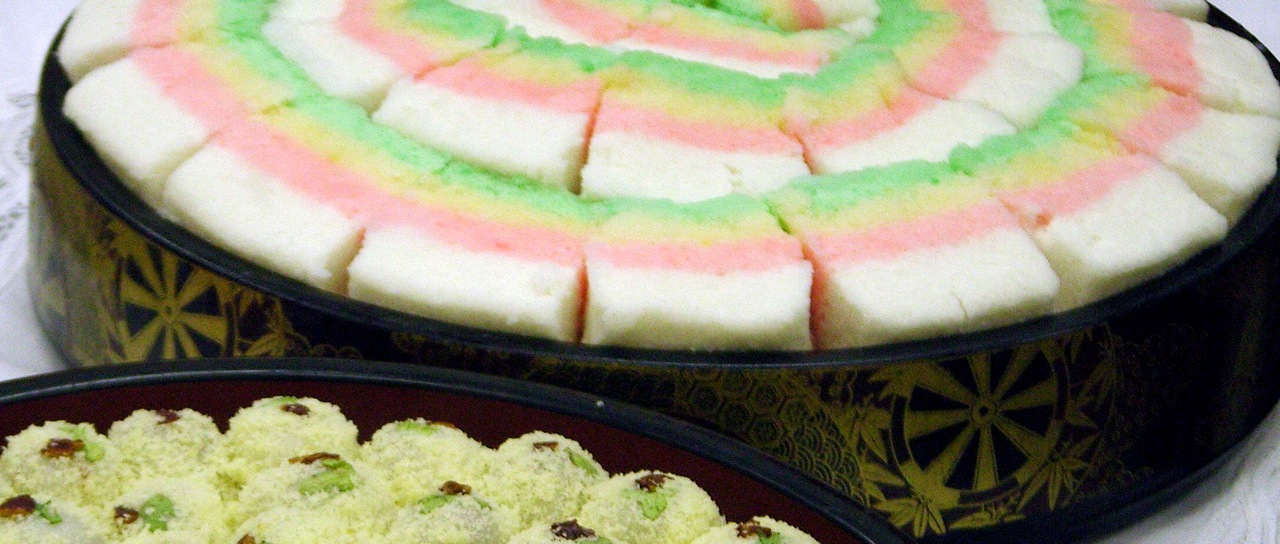
- Alternative names: Rainbow rice cake
- Type: Tteok
- Place of origin: Korea
- Associated cuisine: Korean cuisine
- Main ingredients: Rice flour

Korean name
- Hangul: 무지개떡
- RR: mujigaetteok
- MR: mujigaettŏk
- IPA: [mu.dʑi.gɛ.t͈ʌk̚]

Alternate name
- Hangul: 색떡; 색편
- Hanja: 色떡; 色편
- RR: saektteok; saekpyeon
- MR: saekttŏk; saekp'yŏn
- IPA: [sɛk̚.t͈ʌk̚]; [sɛk̚.pʰjʌn]

Mujigae-tteok (Korean: 무지개떡) or rainbow rice cake is a layered tteok (rice cake) of different colors resembling a rainbow. It is used for special occasions such as a banquet, party, or feast like doljanchi (first birthday), hwangapjanchi (60th birthday). Alternative names for mujigae-tteok include saektteok (색떡) and saekpyeon (색편), both of which means "colored rice cakes".

== Preparation ==
The addition of food coloring makes mujigae-tteok different from the other varieties of seolgi-tteok, such as white baek-seolgi. It is made by steaming sweetened non-glutinous rice flour in a siru (steamer). Sweetened rice flour is made by first grinding soaked rice and mixing it with honey or sugar solution. The flour is then rubbed between the palms for uniform mixing of the ingredients and finally sieved. Food colorings, commonly gardenia (yellow), rock tripe powder (grey), mugwort powder (green), and devil's-tongue powder (pink), are then added and mixed with small amount of water. Colored and white (uncolored) rice flour are then laid on a cloth-lined siru in about 2 centimetres (0.79 in) thick layers and steamed.

== See also ==
- List of Korean desserts
- List of steamed foods
