= Mujigae =

Mujigae (무지개), meaning rainbow in Korean, may refer to:

- Mujigae-tteok, a rice cake
- Tropical Storm Mujigae, 2009
- Typhoon Mujigae, 2015
- Mujigae, a 2024 film
