= Tteokguk =

Traditional Korean dish

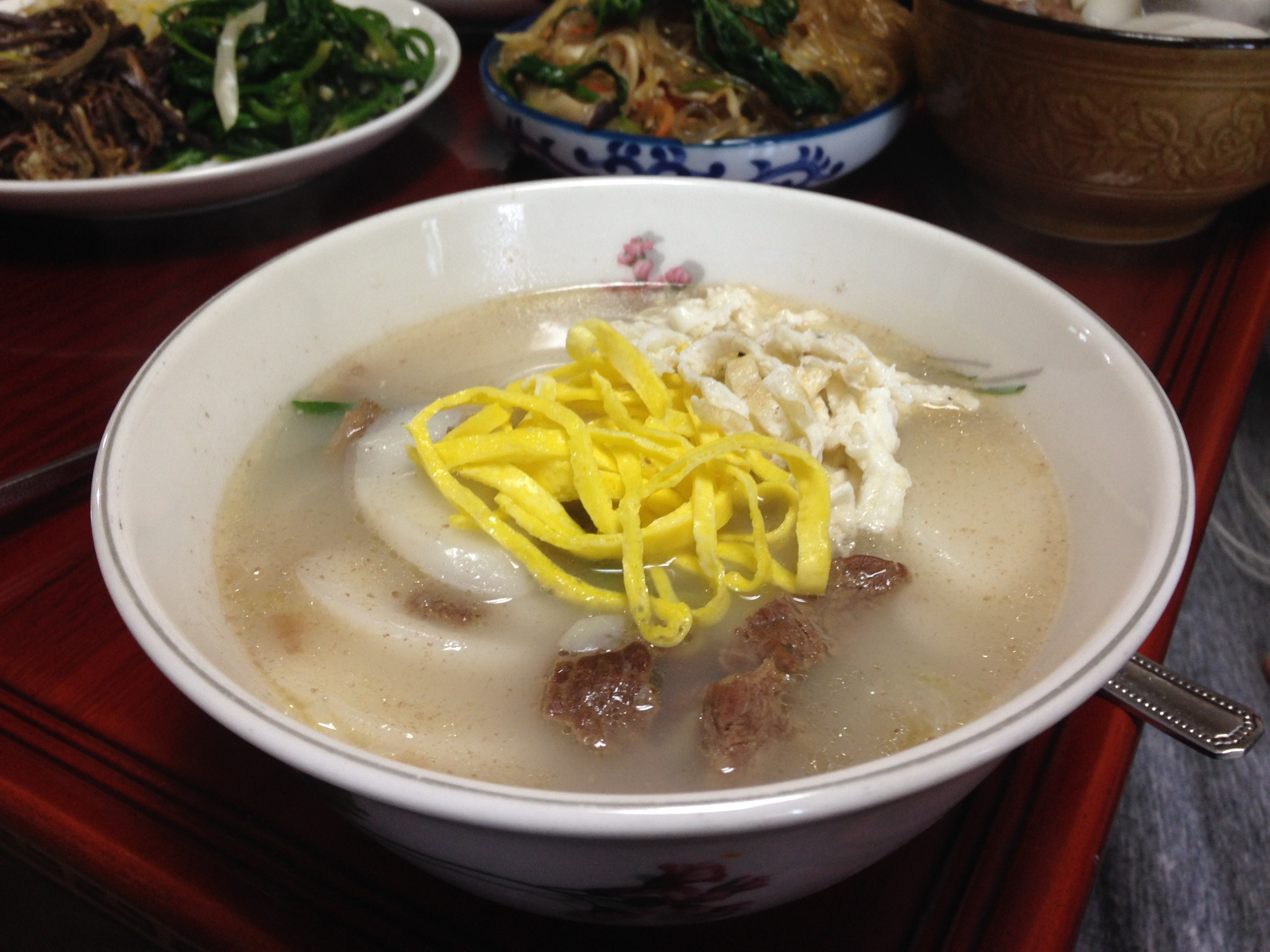
- Alternative names: Rice cake soup
- Type: Soup
- Place of origin: Korea
- Main ingredients: Rice cakes
- Food energy (per 1 serving): 120 kcal (500 kJ)
- Other information: related to Korean New Year

Korean name
- Hangul: 떡국
- RR: tteokguk
- MR: ttŏkkuk
- IPA: [t͈ʌk̚.k͈uk̚]

Tteokguk (Korean: 떡국) or sliced rice cake soup is a traditional Korean dish eaten during the celebration of the Korean New Year. The dish consists of broth/soup (guk) with thinly sliced rice cakes (tteok). Eating tteokguk on New Year's Day is traditionally believed to grant good luck for the year and confer one sal (a year of age). It is usually garnished with thin julienned cooked eggs, marinated meat, gim (김), and sesame oil (참기름).

== History ==
The origin of eating tteokguk on New Year's Day is unknown. However, tteokguk is mentioned in the 19th-century book of customs Dongguksesigi (동국세시기; 東國歲時記) as being made with beef or pheasant used as the main ingredient for the broth, and pepper added as seasoning. The book also mentions the custom of having a bowl of tteokguk in the morning of New Year's Day to get a year older, and the custom of saying "How many bowls of tteokguk have you eaten?" to ask a person's age.

In the book The Customs of Joseon written in 1946 by historian Ch'oe Namsŏn, the New Year custom of eating tteokguk is speculated as being originated from ancient times. The white tteok signifying purity and cleanliness have been eaten during that specific day and it became a ritual to start off the New Year for good fortune.

== On Seollal ==
In Korea, on Seollal, a family performs ancestral rites by serving tteokguk to their ancestors during a joint meal. Although tteokguk is traditionally a seasonal dish, it is now eaten at all times of the year.

== Ingredients and varieties ==
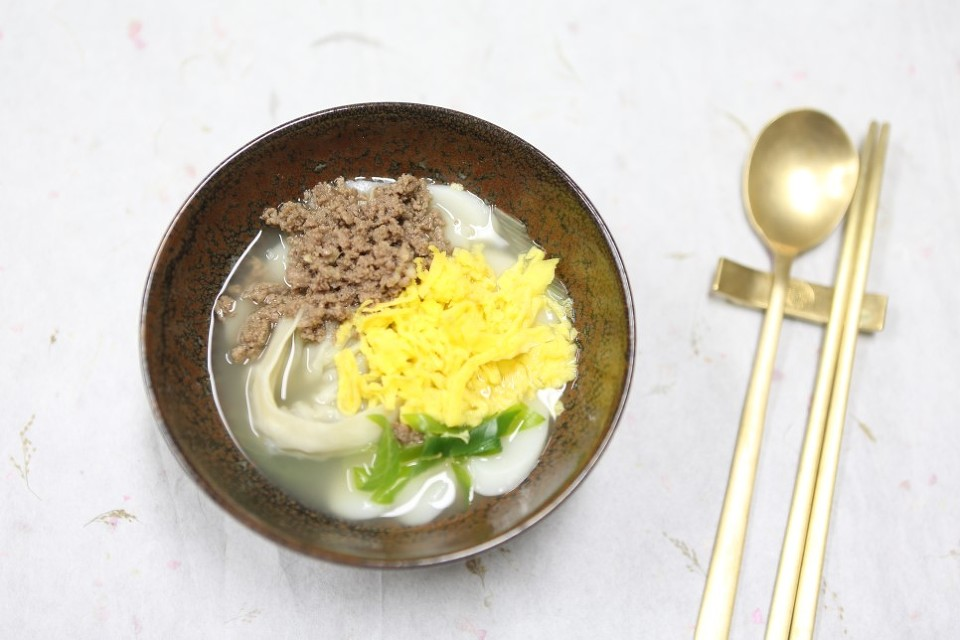
Tteokmanduguk (rice cake dumpling soup)

The broth is generally made by simmering the main protein (beef, chicken, pork, pheasant, seafood) in a ganjang-seasoned stock. In the past, pheasant meat or chicken was used to make tteokguk's broth, but nowadays, beef is mainly used. The stock is then strained to clarify the broth, and long cylinder-shaped garaetteok are thin-sliced diagonally and boiled in the clear broth. Garnish is added before serving; the garnish may vary by region and personal taste, but usual staples are pan-fried julienned egg yolks and whites, gim and spring onions. A drizzle of sesame oil is common just prior to serving the teokguk.

Varieties of tteokguk include saeng tteokguk (생떡국) or nal tteokguk (날떡국), a specialty of Chungcheong province, where a mixture of non-glutinous rice with glutinous rice is made into small balls or rolled into a garaetteok shape and then sliced into a boiling broth; joraengi tteokguk (조랭이 떡국) from the Kaesong region with the tteok twisted in small cocoon shapes; and gon tteokguk (곤떡국) from the island of Jeju, which uses sliced jeolpyeon tteok rather than the usual garaetteok. In Jeolla-do, we make chicken Jangtteokguk with chicken and soy sauce.

== In popular culture ==
A movie with the name Tteokguk (English title "New Year's Soup") was released in 1971 starring Yoon Jeong-hee and Um Aing-ran.

== See also ==
- Korean cuisine
- List of soups
- Niángāo, a rice food eaten on Chinese New Year whose Shanghai variety is like tteok
- Zōni, a similar soup eaten in Japan on New Year's Day
