= Anban =

Anban may refer to:

- Anban, a utensil used in Korean cooking
- Anban (film), an Indian film made in 1944
- MV Anban, a Panamanian cargo ship in service 1964-65
