= Tteok =

Korean rice cakes

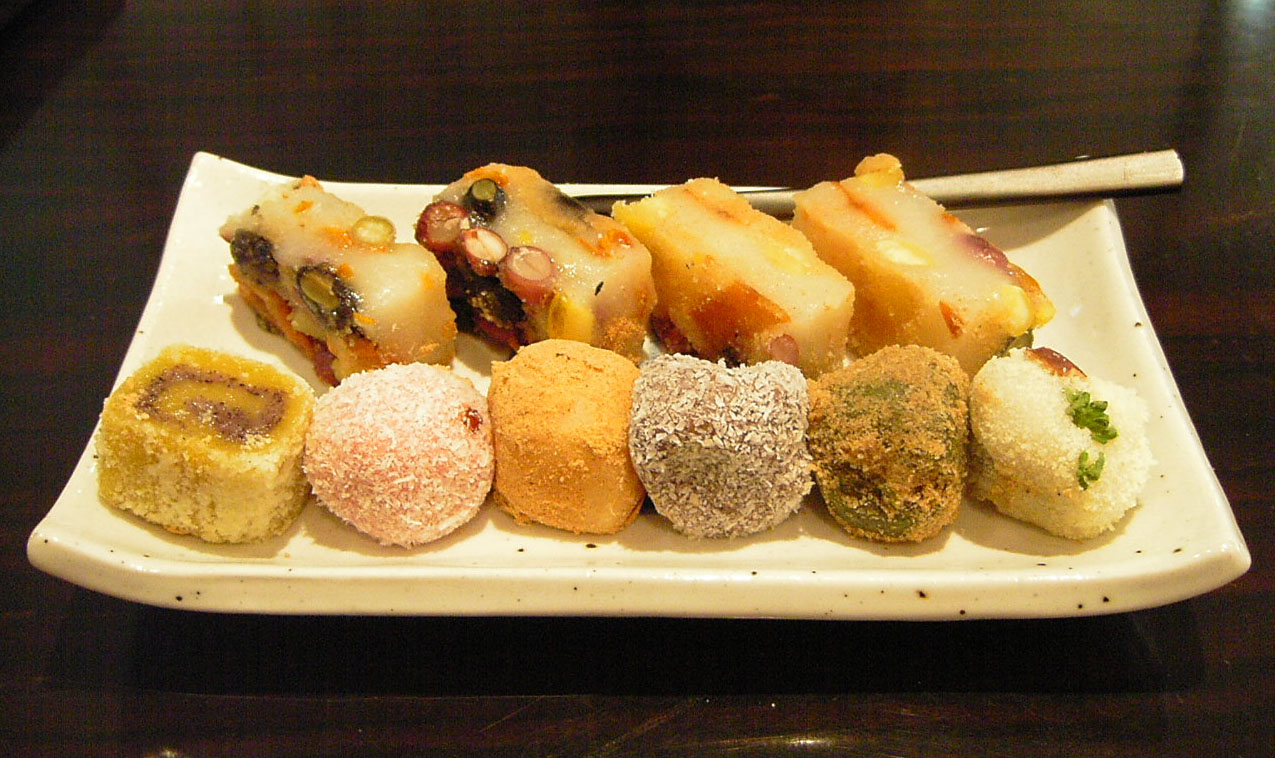
- Alternative names: Rice cake
- Type: Rice cake
- Place of origin: Korea
- Main ingredients: Flour made of various grains, including glutinous or non-glutinous rice
- Variations: Steamed, pounded, shaped, pan-fried

Korean name
- Hangul: 떡
- RR: tteok
- MR: ttŏk
- IPA: [t͈ʌk̚]

Tteok (Korean: 떡) is a general term for Korean rice cakes. They are made with steamed flour of various grains, both glutinous and non-glutinous rice. Steamed flour can also be pounded, shaped, or pan-fried to make tteok. In some cases, tteok is pounded from cooked grains.

Tteok is eaten not only as a dessert or seasonal delicacy, but also as a meal. It can range from elaborate versions made of various colors, fragrances, and shapes using nuts, fruits, flowers, and namul (herbs/wild greens), to plain white rice tteok used in home cooking. Some common ingredients for many kinds of tteok are red bean, soybean, mung bean, mugwort, pumpkin, chestnut, pine nut, jujube, dried fruits, sesame seeds and oil, and honey.

Tteok is usually shared. Tteok offered to spirits is called boktteok ("good fortune rice cake") and shared with neighbours and relatives. It is also one of the celebratory foods used in banquets, rites, and various festive events. Tteokguk ("rice cake soup") is shared to celebrate Korean New Year and songpyeon is shared on Chuseok, a harvest festival.

== History ==
The history of Korean rice cakes goes back to Korean primitive agricultural society. It is presumed to have been consumed from around the 7th to 8th centuries B.C., as there are records of sowing seeds, plowing, and farming along with ancient artifacts found throughout the country. Found in the ruins were artifacts such as the galdol (a flat stone used as a tool when grinding fruit against a grind stone) and the dolhwag (a small mortar made of stone) used throughout that period.

The origin of rice cakes began in prehistoric times when the coarse flour obtained from the primitive threshing process of mixed grains was baked or pan-fried without the use of cooking utensils.

== Utensils for making tteok ==
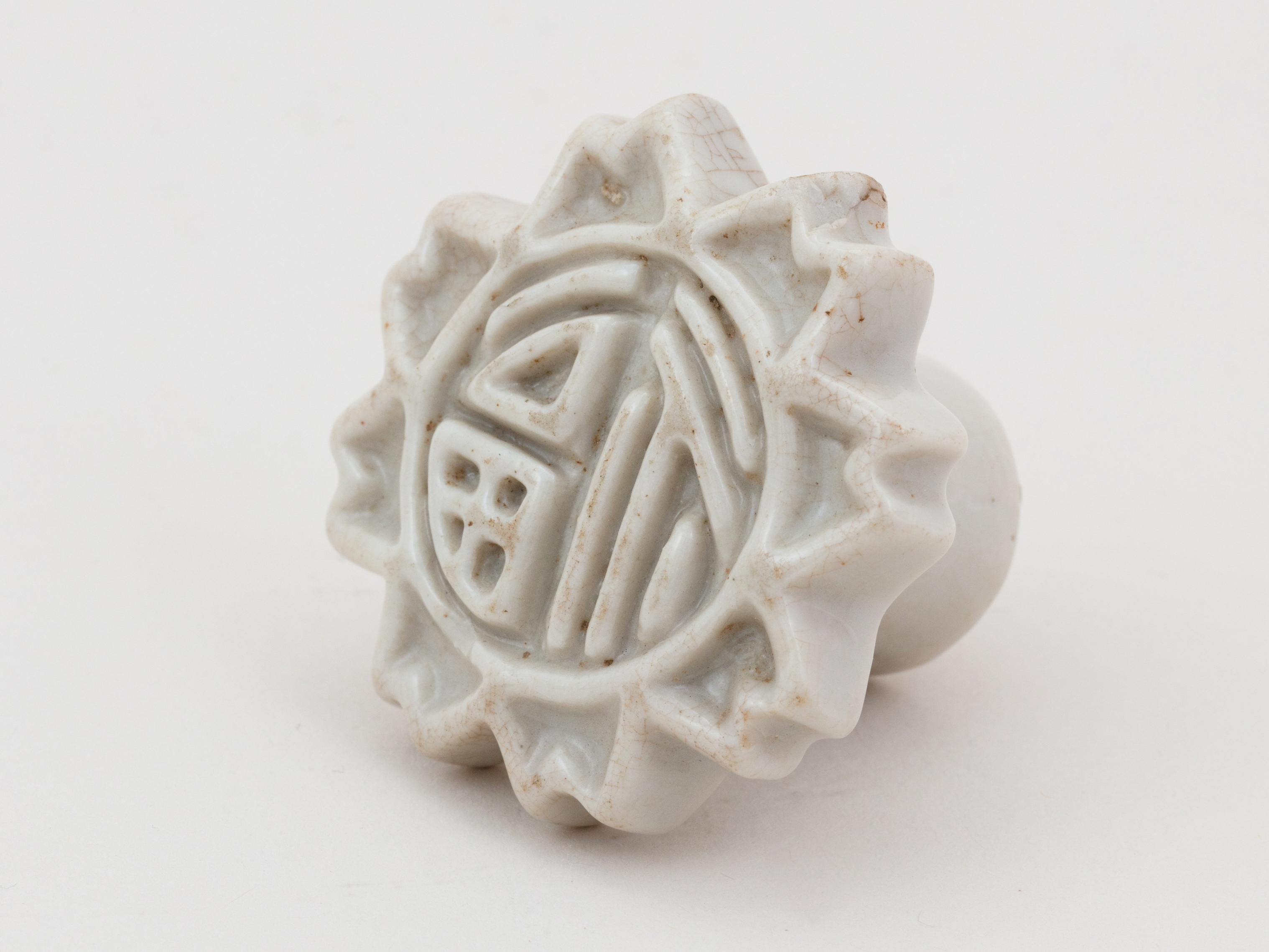
Tteoksal

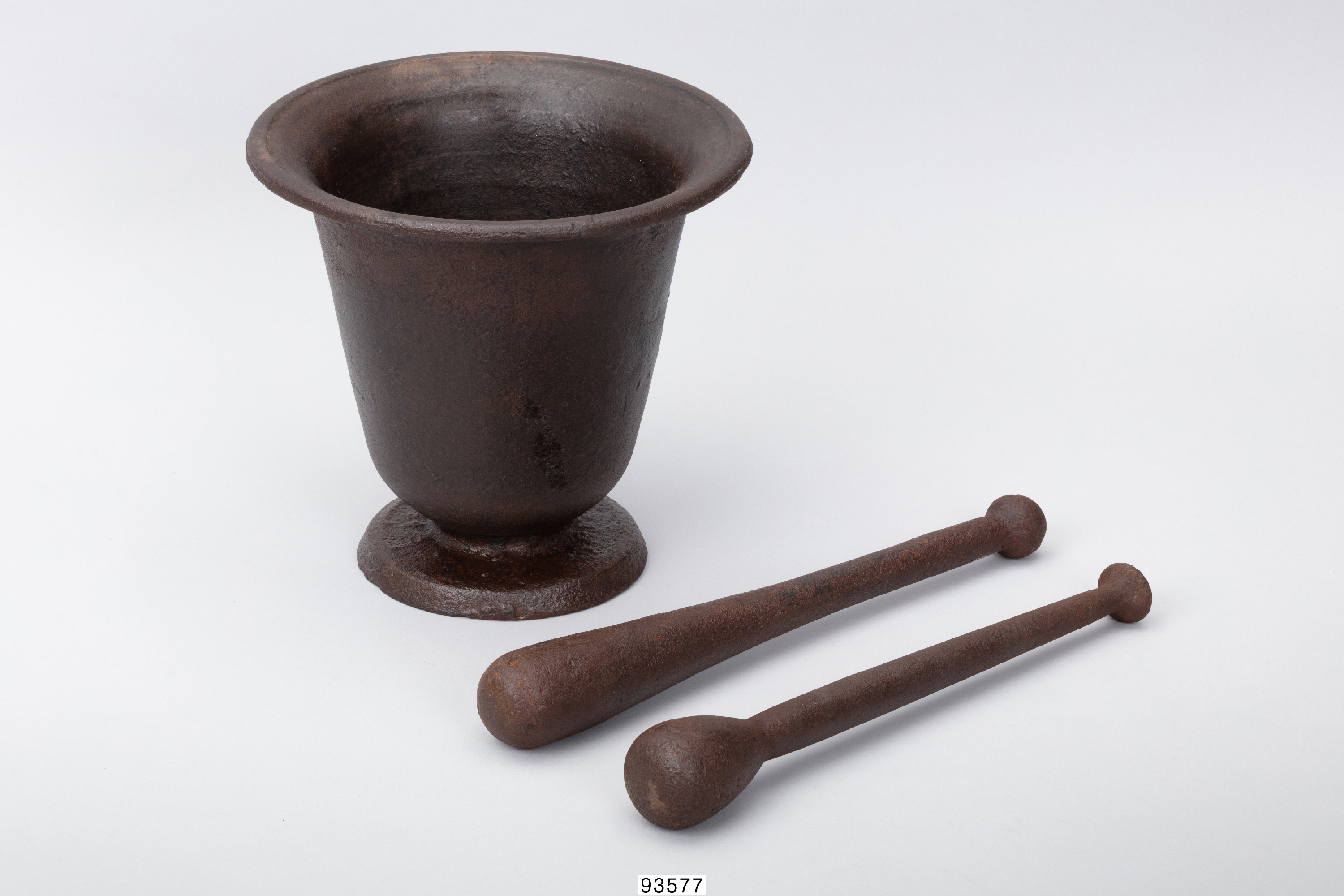
Jeolgu

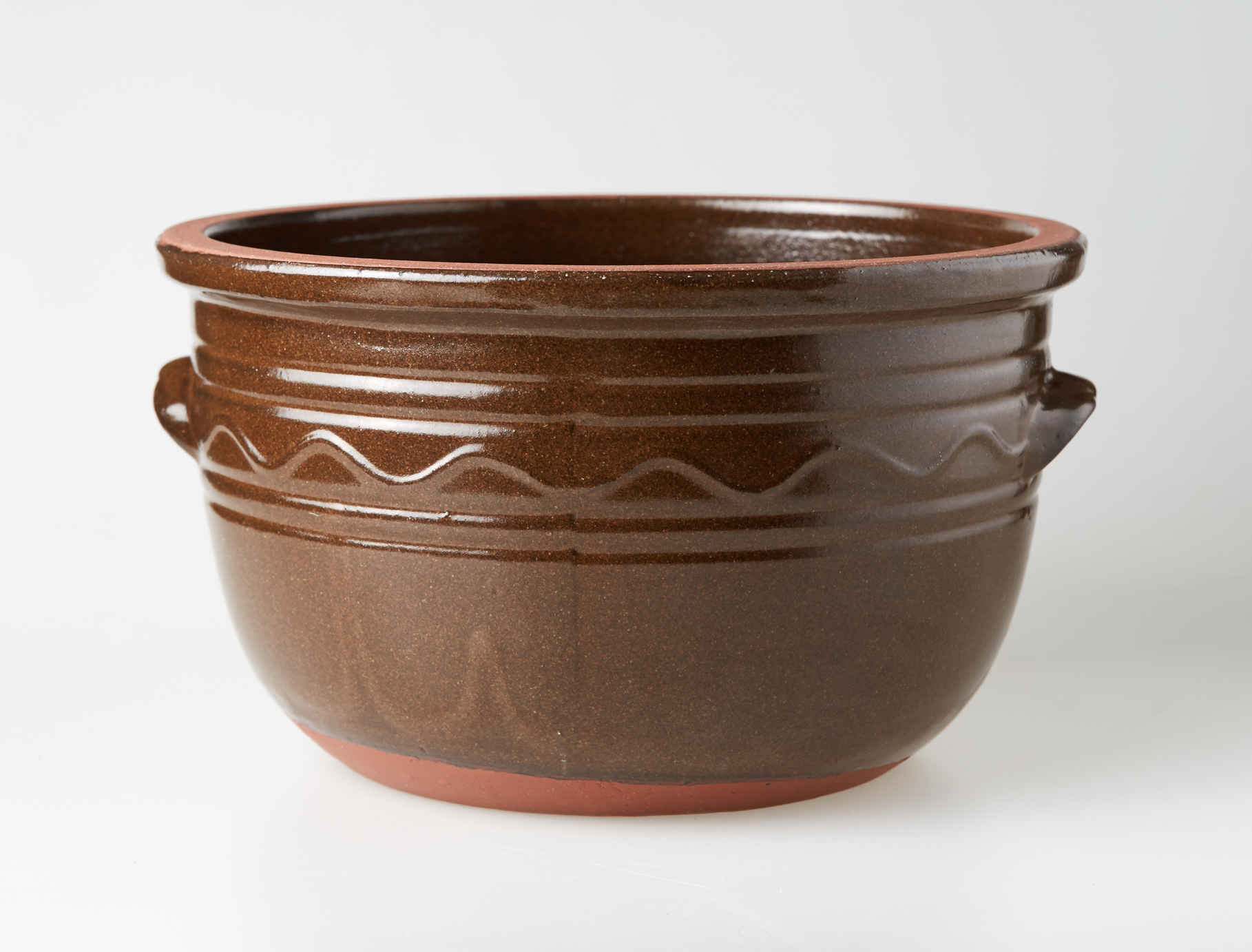
Siru

Below are cooking utensils used to make tteok in the traditional Korean way.

- Ki (키), winnowing basket
- Inambak (이남박), rice-washing bowl
- Bagaji (바가지), gourd-like dipper
- Ongbaegi (옹배기) and jabaegi (자배기), large, round pottery bowls
- Che (체) and chetdari (쳇다리), sieve and sieve-frame legs
- Maetdol (맷돌), grinding stone
- Jeolgu (절구) and jeolgutgongi (절굿공이), mortar and pestle
- Anban (안반) and tteokme (떡메), wooden pounding board and mallet
- Siru (시루) and sirumit (시루밑), earthenware steamer and mat placed in the bottom of it
- Sot (솥) and geonggeure (겅그레), cauldron and steaming rack
- Beoncheol (번철), thick frying pan
- Chaeban (채반), wicker tray
- Tteoksal (떡살), wooden tteok pattern stamp

== Types ==
Tteok is largely divided into four categories: steamed tteok (찌는 떡), pounded tteok (치는 떡), boiled tteok (삶는 떡) and pan-fried tteok (지지는 떡). The steamed tteok is made by steaming rice or glutinous rice flour in a siru (시루), a large earthenware steamer, so it is often called sirutteok (시루떡). It is regarded as the basic and oldest form of tteok. Pounded tteok is made by using a pounding board or mortar after steaming it first. In making pan-fried tteok, the rice dough is flattened like a pancake and pan-fried with vegetable oil. Shaped tteok are made by kneading dough with hot water, then shaping it into balls.

=== Steamed tteok ===
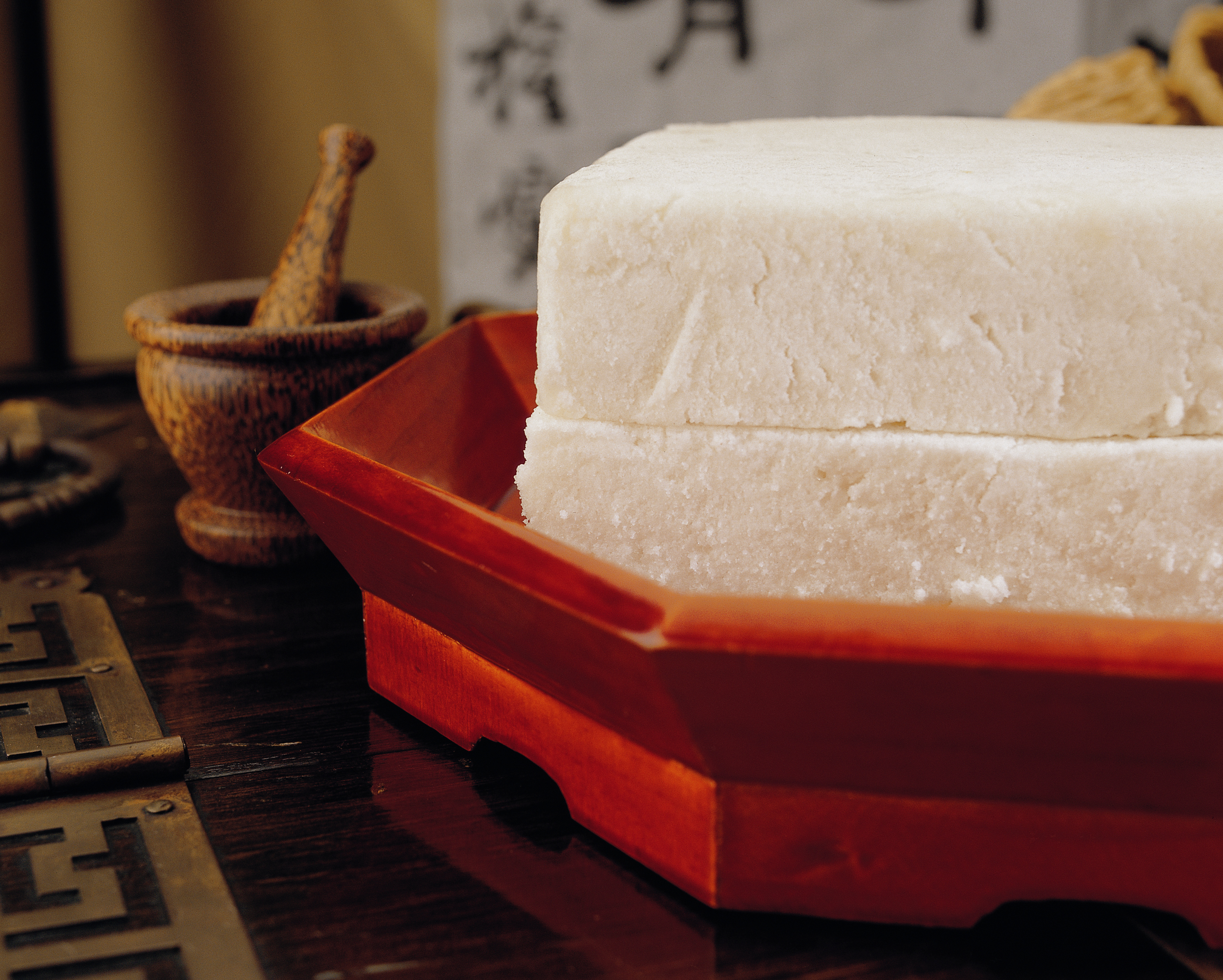
Baekseolgi

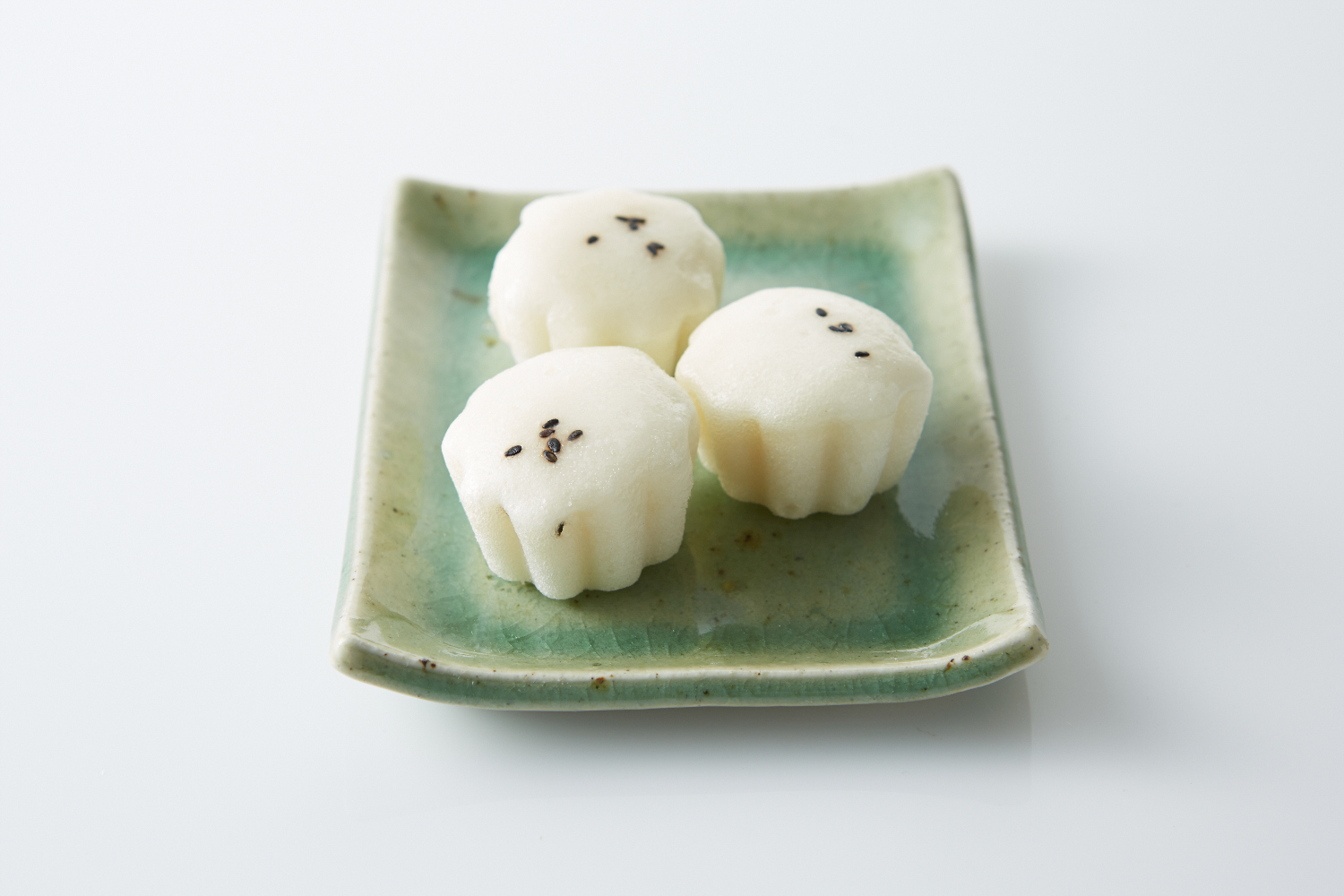
Sultteok

The main ingredients for steamed tteok or sirutteok are rice (멥쌀, mebssal in Korean) or glutinous rice (찹쌀 chapssal), and sometimes they are mixed together. In some cases, other grains, beans (azuki beans or mung beans), sesame seeds, wheat flour, or starch are mixed with the rice. Various fruits and nuts are used as subsidiary ingredients, such as persimmons, peaches or apricots, chestnuts, walnuts, and pine nuts. In addition, marinated vegetables or herbs can be used to flavor the tteok. Danggwi leaves (Ostericum grosseserratum), seogi mushroom (manna lichen), radish, artemisia, pepper, and cheongju are the most common flavorings, and honey and sugar are used as sweeteners.

In order to make steamed tteok or sirutteok, rice or glutinous rice is soaked in water for a while, then ground. The prepared rice flour is put in a siru and steamed. According to steaming method, sirutteok is subdivided into two groups: seolgitteok (설기떡), which is shaped into a single large lump, and kyeotteok (켜떡), which consists of multiple layers with adzuki bean powder or other bean powder. Seolgitteok is also called muritteok (무리떡), which is regarded as the most basic form of sirutteok because it is made only of rice. When making kyeotteok, rice and glutinous rice are mixed. The name kyeotteok derives from the adverb kyeokeyo (켜켜, literally "layered") in Korean because this tteok is made in layers.

- Baekseolgi (백설기) - a variety of sirutteok. It literally means white snow tteok and is made of white rice.
- Kongtteok (콩떡) - tteok made with various kinds of beans
- Jeungpyeon (Korean: 증편) or sultteok (Korean: 설떡) - tteok made with makgeolli (unfiltered rice wine)
- Mujigae tteok (무지개떡) - literally "rainbow tteok"; this variety of tteok has colorful stripes. The tteok is used especially for janchi (잔치), a Korean banquet, party, or feast such as dol (celebrating a baby's first birthday), Hwangap (celebrating a 60th birthday), or gyeolhon janchi (wedding party)

=== Pounded tteok ===
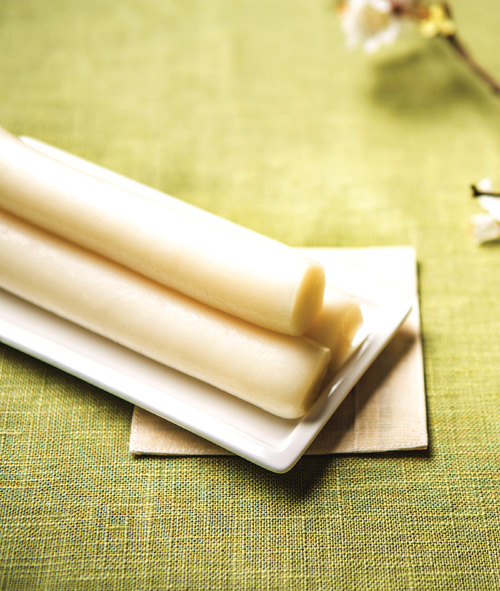
Garae-tteok

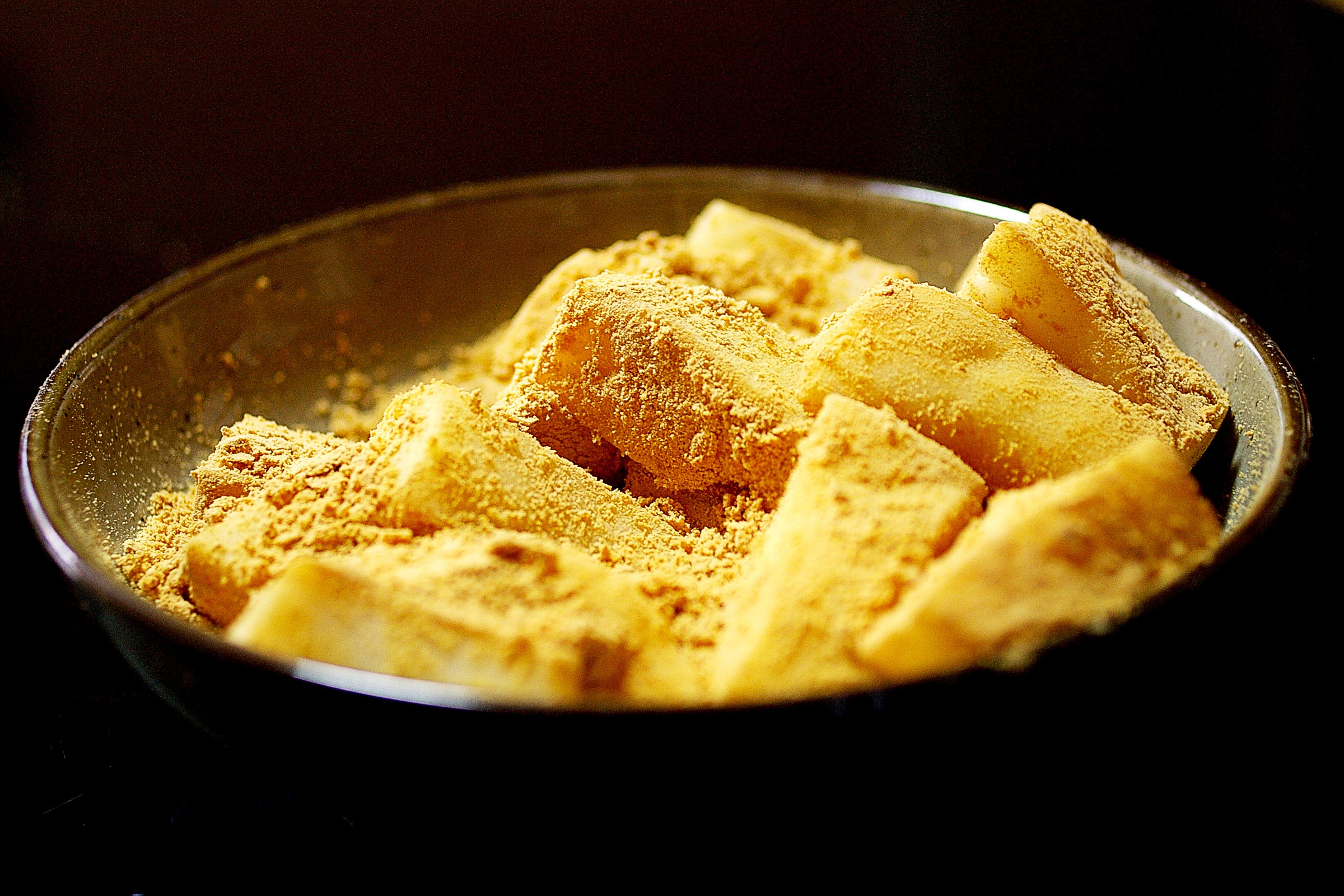
Injeolmi

In traditional preparations, pounded tteok is made by pounding rice or glutinous rice with utensils called jeolgu and jeolgutgongi or tteokme and anban. Injeolmi (tteok coated with adzuki bean powder or roasted soybean powder), garaetteok (가래떡 cylinder-shaped white tteok), jeolpyeon (절편 patterned tteok) and danja (단자 glutinous tteok ball coated with bean paste) are the most commonly eaten pounded tteok.

Rice and glutinous rice are hulled to make grain particles or powder and then steamed in a siru (earthenware steamer) and pounded with utensils. The pounded tteok is divided by rice type into glutinous pounded tteok (찹쌀도병 chapssal dobyeong) and non-glutinous pounded tteok (맵쌀도병 mapssal dobyeong). Injeolmi, a representative of glutinous pounded tteok, varies in accordance with gomul types (고물, coating made with bean powder, sesame seeds, or sliced jujubes) or subsidiary ingredients mixed into the steamed rice while pounding on the anban. Patinjeolmi (팥인절미), and kkaeinjeolmi (깨인절미) are examples for the former, coated with red bean powder and sesame, respectively. In ssuk injeolmi (쑥인절미) and surichwi injeolmi (수리취인절미), ssuk (Artemisia indica) and surichwi (Synurus deltoides (AIT.) NAKAI) are added.

- Garae-tteok (가래떡; also called huin tteok, 흰떡, literally "white tteok") – tteok formed into a long white cylinder. The thinly sliced garae tteok is used for making tteok guk.
- Omegi tteok (오메기떡) – traditional tteok of Jeju Island, the biggest island in Korea

=== Shaped tteok ===
- Ggul tteok (꿀떡) - literally means "tteok with honey" but the tteok is stuffed with Korean syrup. Ggul tteok is similar to songpyeon in shape, but smaller in size
- Songpyeon (송편) - eaten during Chuseok holiday (추석), Korean thanksgiving day
- Gochitteok (고치떡)
- Ssamtteok (쌈떡) - tteok used for ssam (쌈, food wrapped in a leaf)
- Dalgal tteok (닭알떡) - named after dalgal (달걀 or 계란 egg)
- Gyeongdan - Inside these rice balls are usually red bean or sesame paste. The balls are usually dipped and covered in black sesame or other powders.
- Bupyeon, consisting of dough made of glutinous rice flour with a sweet filling and coated in gomul (powdered beans).

=== Pan-fried tteok ===
- Hwajeon - small, sweet pancakes made of flour of glutinous rice and decorated with flower petals of the Korean azalea, chrysanthemum, or rose.
- Bukkumi (부꾸미), pan-fried sweet tteok with various fillings in a crescent shape
- Juak (주악), made of glutinous rice flour and stuffed with fillings such as mushrooms, jujubes, and chestnuts, and pan-fried. Juak are colored with natural coloring and covered with sugar or coated in honey.

=== Other varieties ===
- Ssuk tteok (쑥떡)
- Gaksaek pyeon (각색편)

== Gallery ==
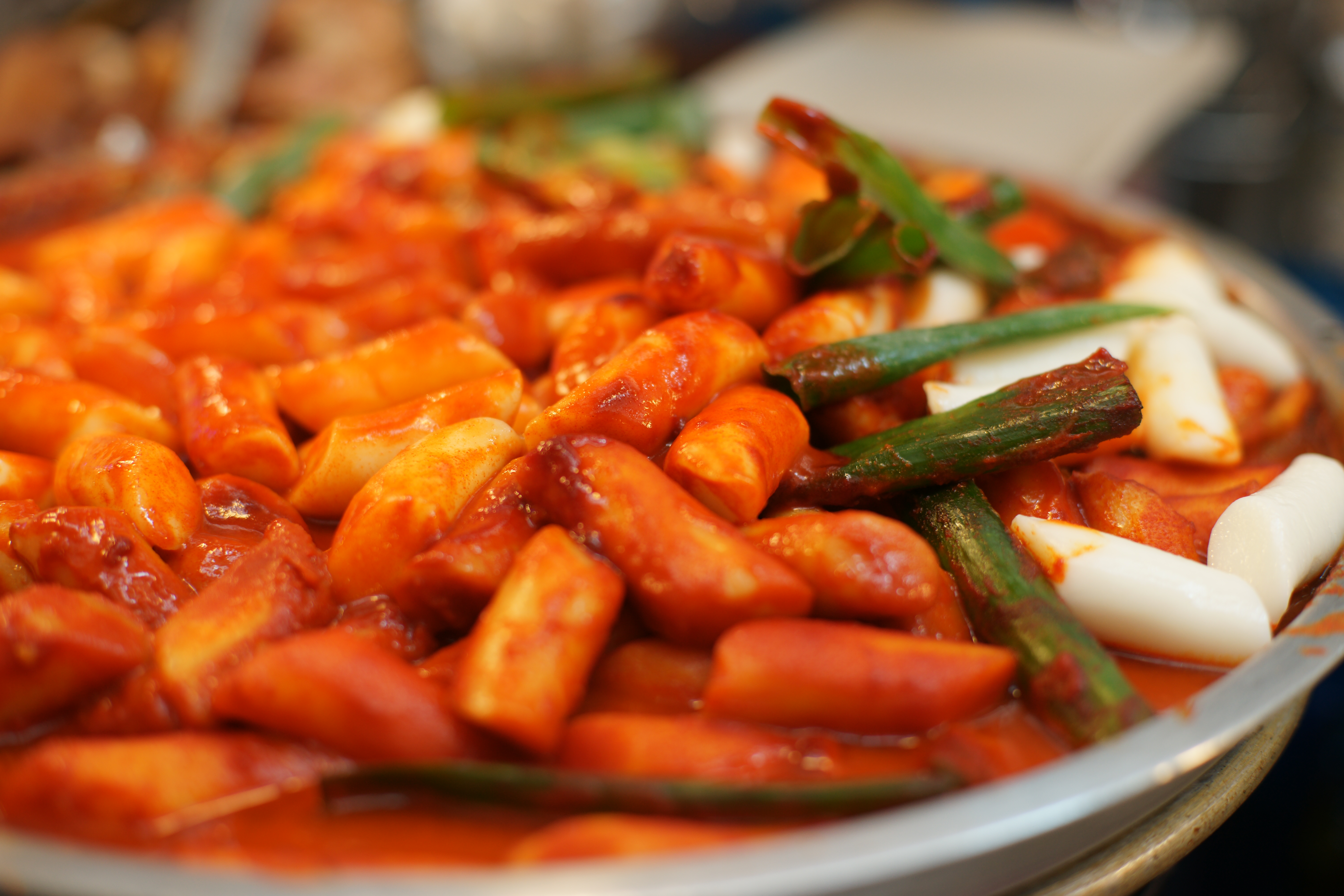
Tteokbokki

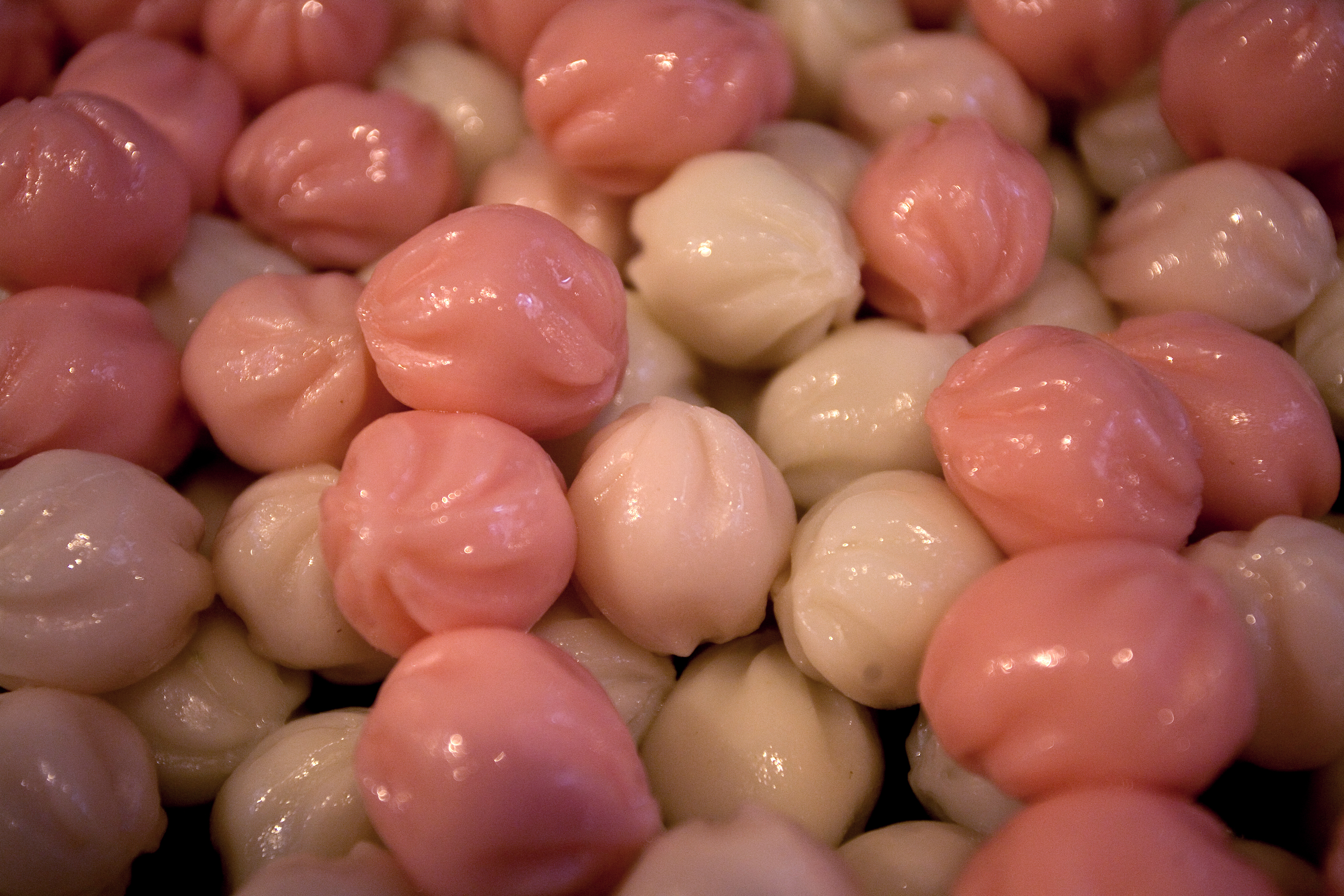
Kkul-tteok

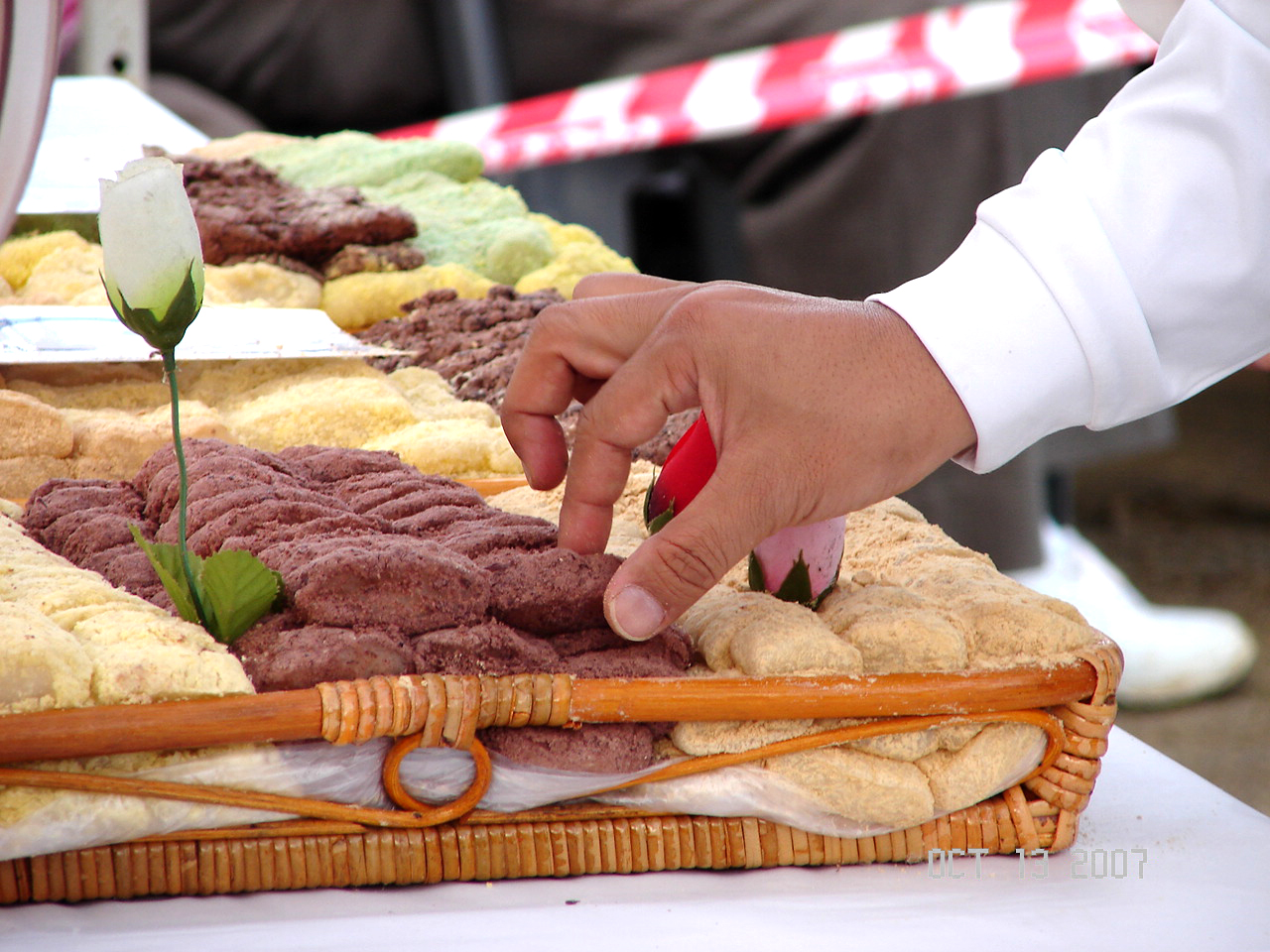
Injeolmi

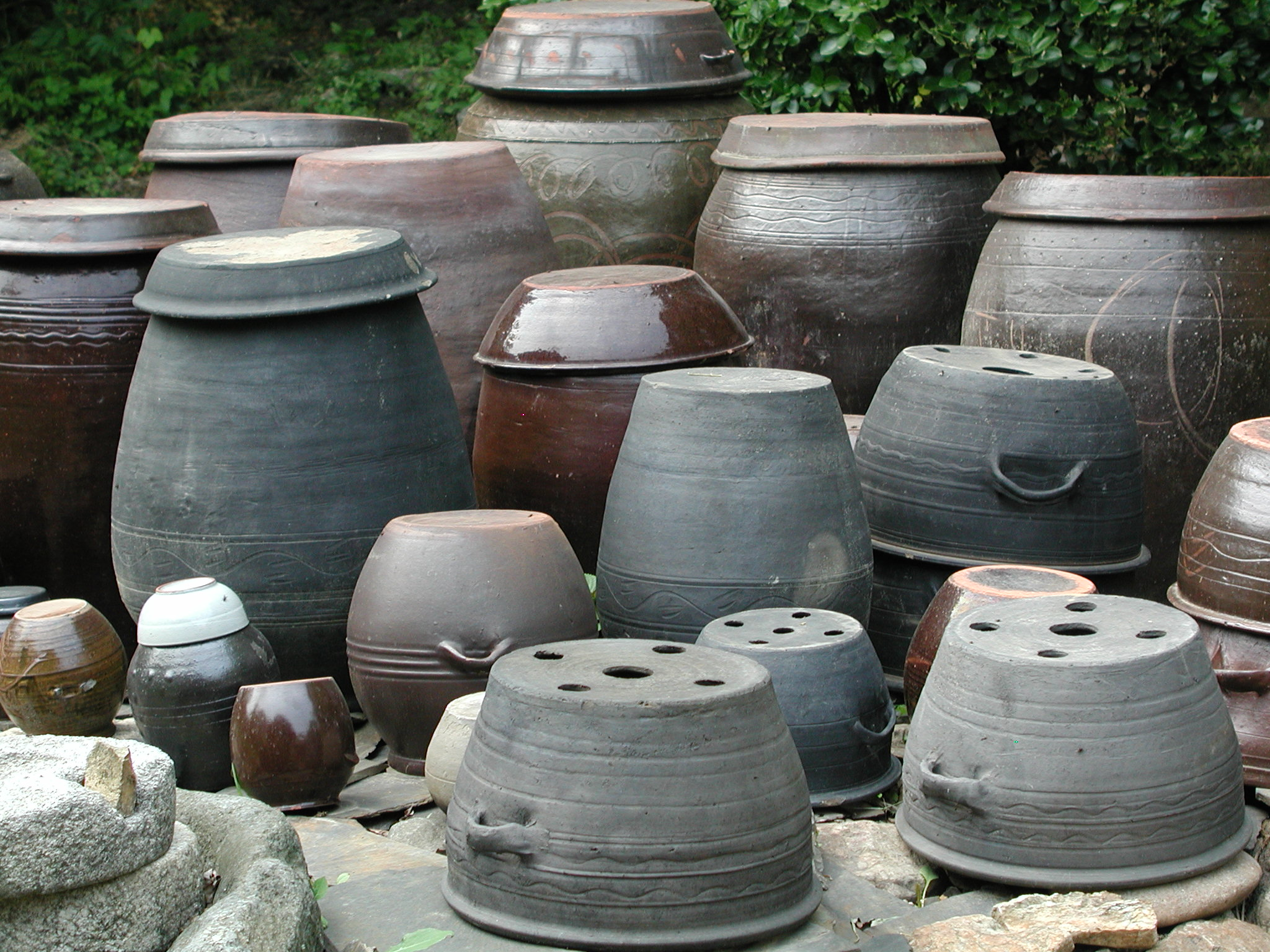
Siru in front and other onggi (generic term for earthenware)

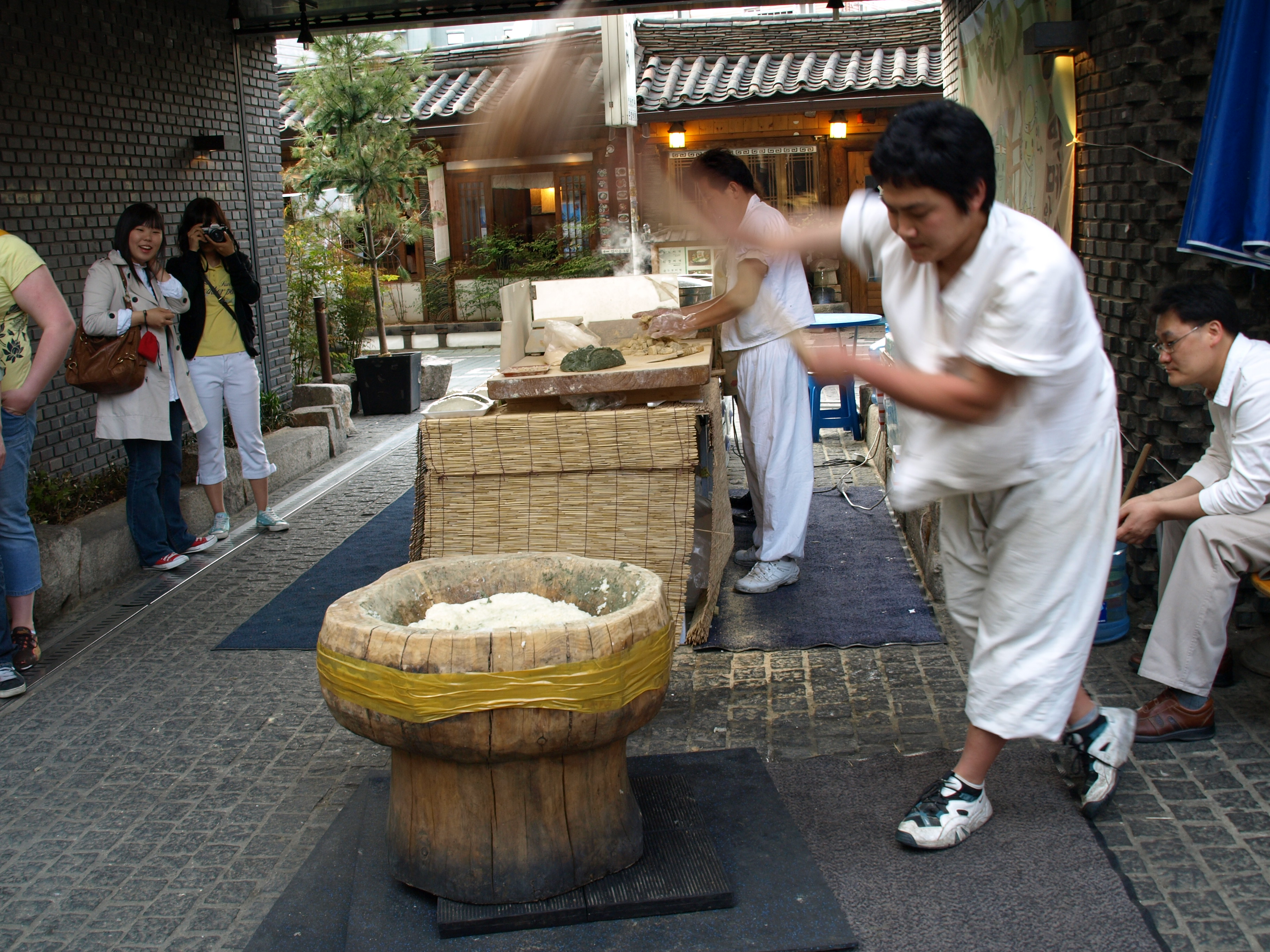
Pounding tteok

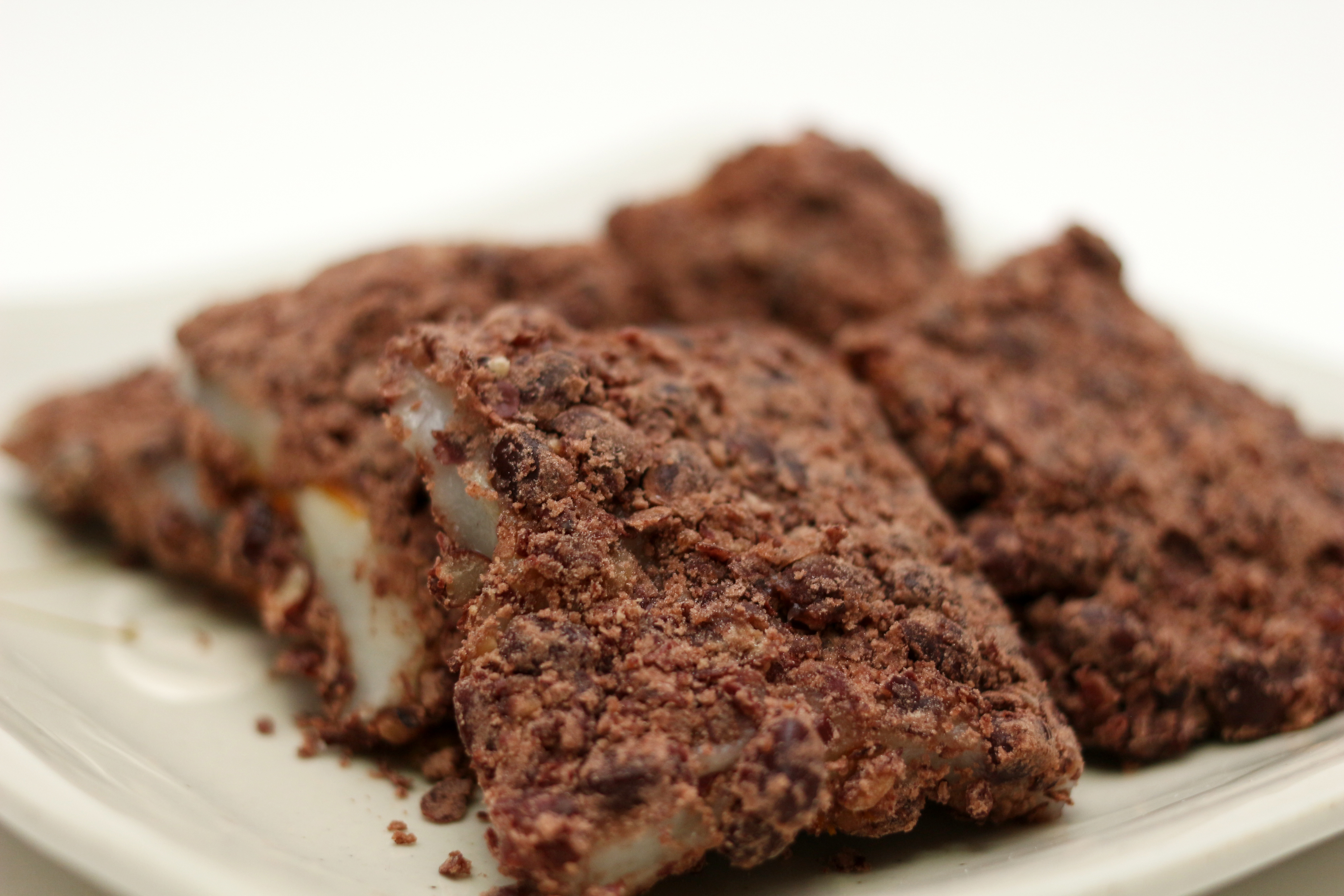
Pat sirutteok, steamed sirutteok topped with red beans

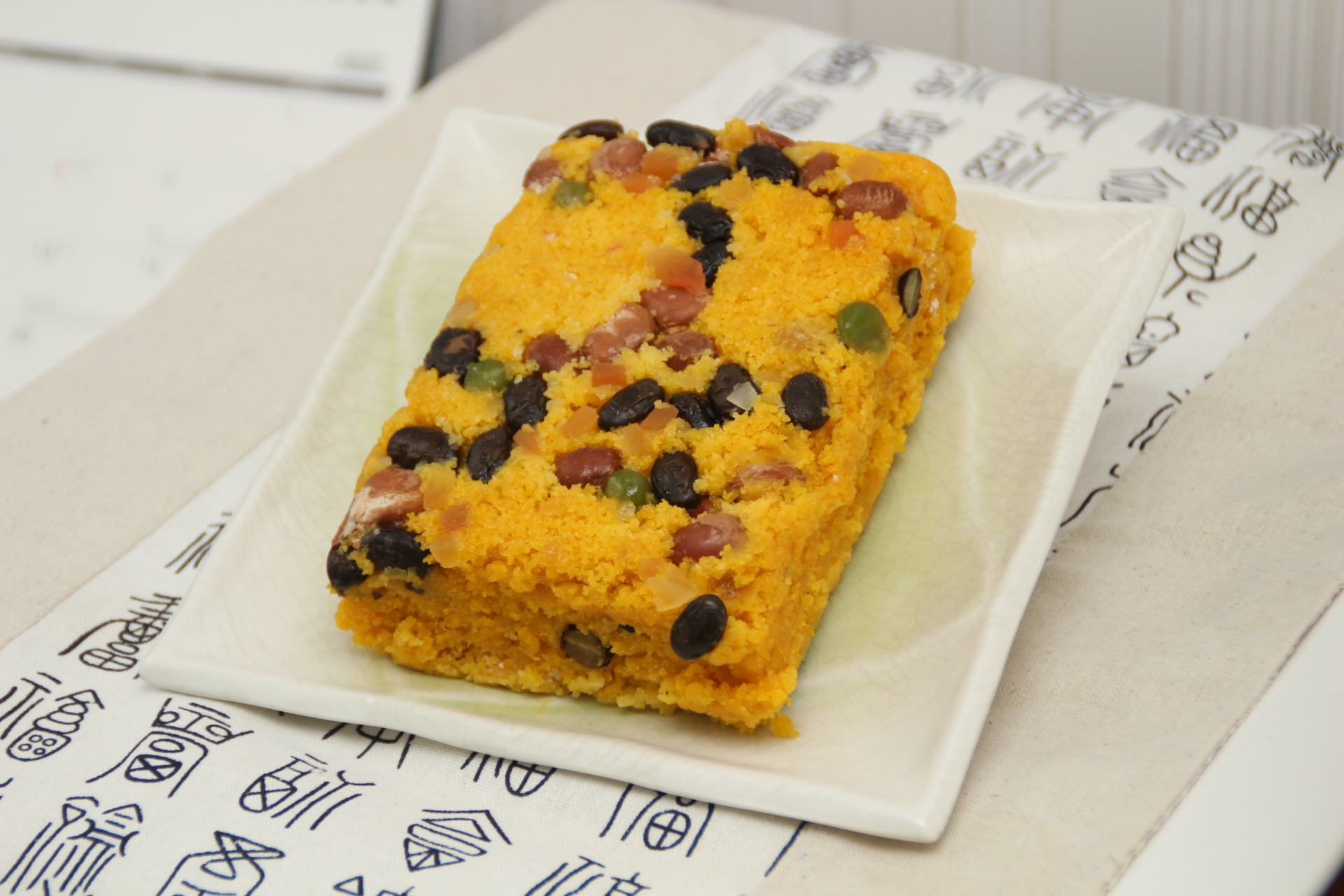
Hobak seolgitteok, steamed seolgitteok made with pumpkins

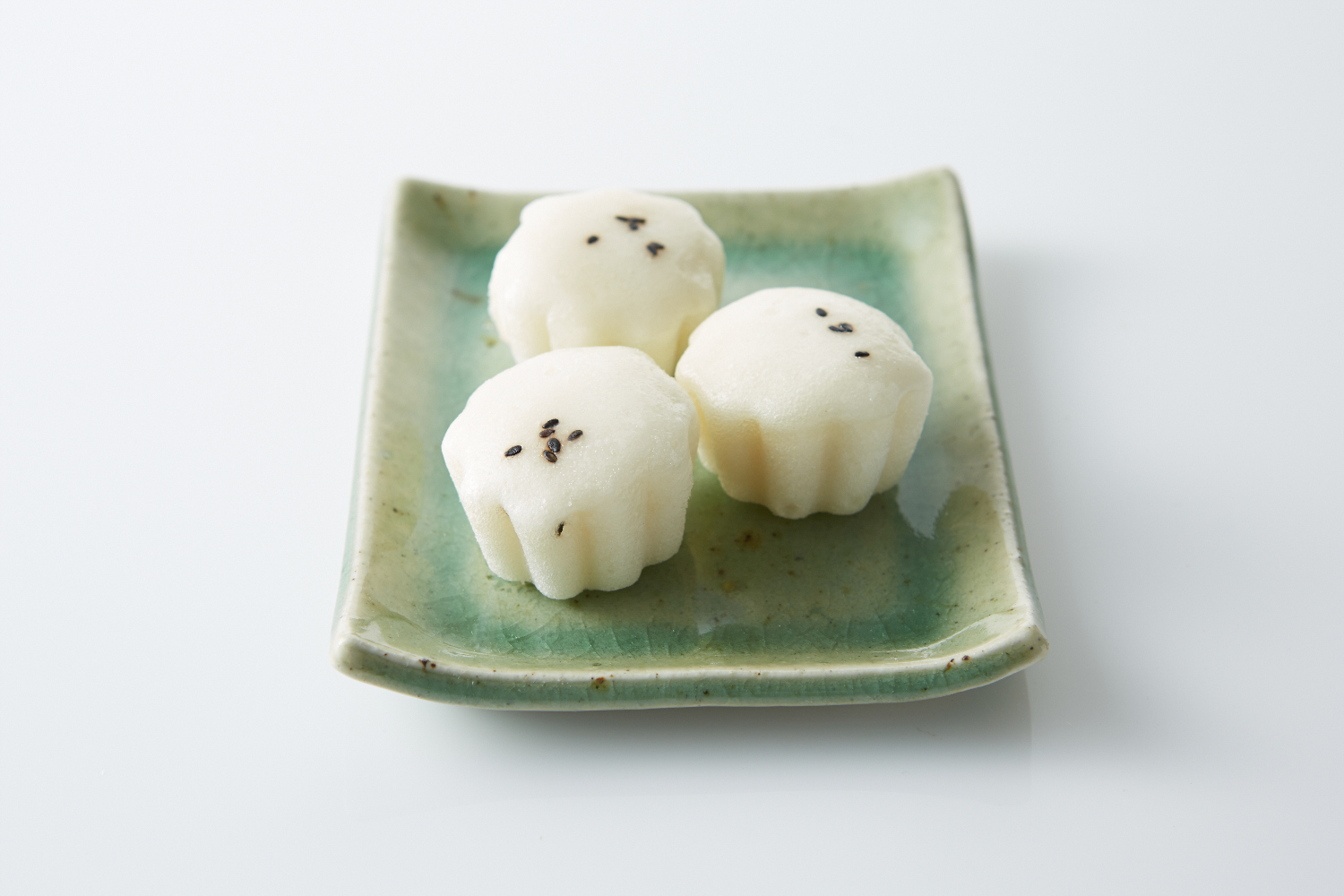
Sultteok

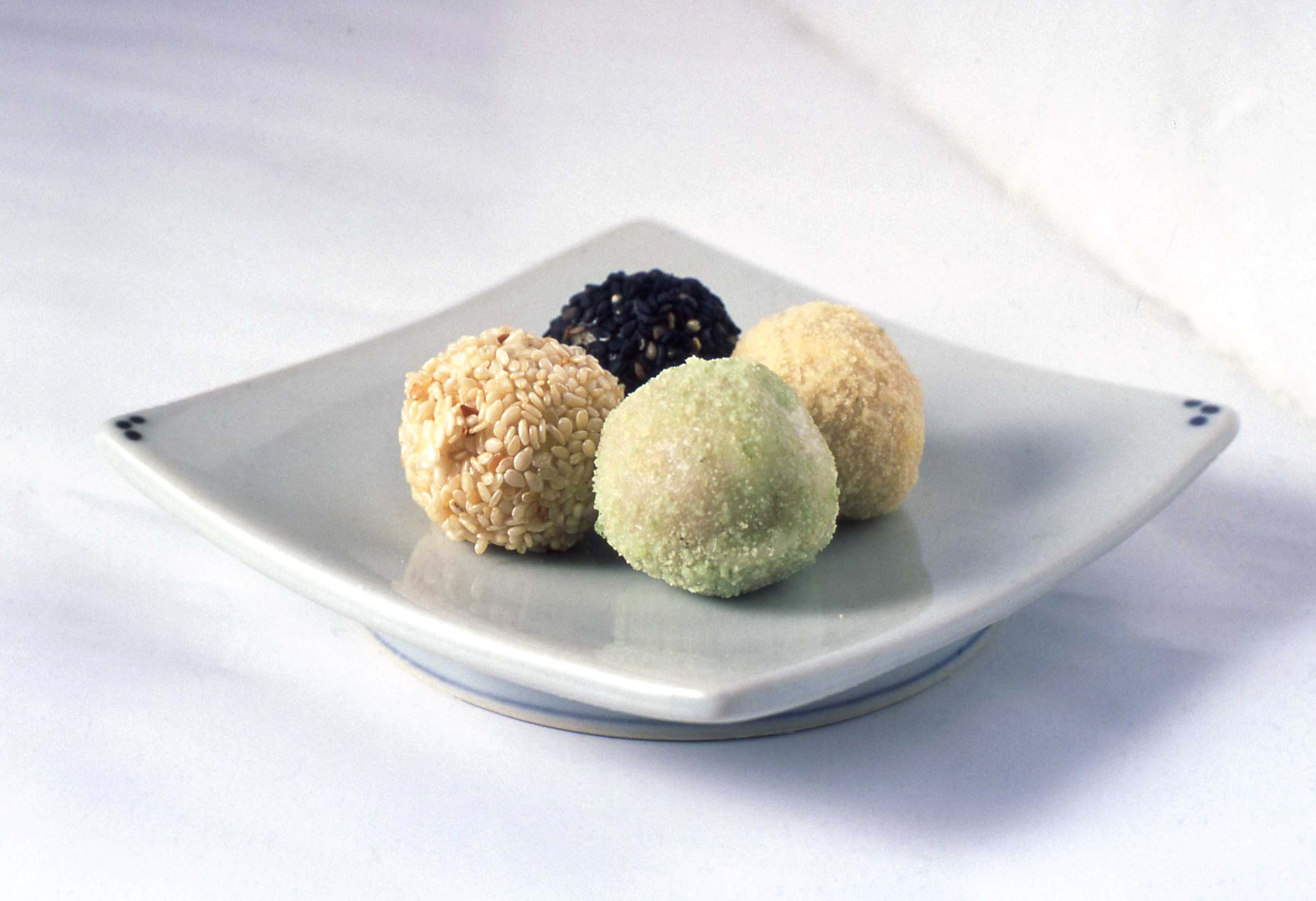
Rice cake ball

== Dishes made with tteok ==
- Tteok guk
- Tteokbokki
- Tteok-kkochi

== See also ==
- Nian gao, similar Chinese category
- Korean cuisine
- List of Korean desserts
- List of steamed foods
