= Omegi-tteok =

Korean rice cake variety

Omegi Tteok
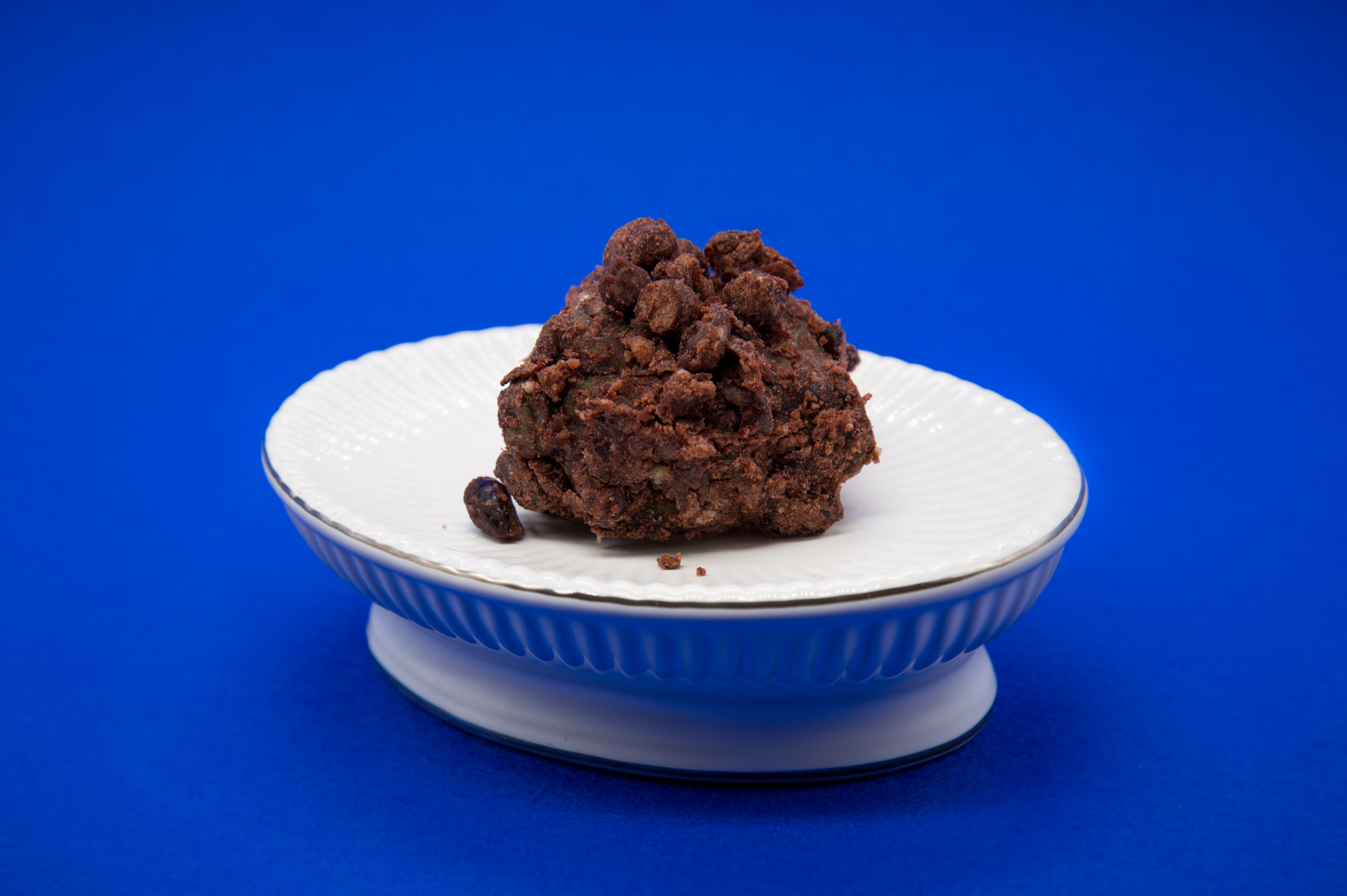
- a frontal view of a typical Omegi Tteok served on a plate
- Type: Tteok
- Place of origin: Korea
- Region or state: Jeju Province
- Main ingredients: Millet, red bean

Korean name
- Hangul: 오메기떡
- RR: omegitteok
- MR: omegittŏk

Omegi-tteok (Korean: 오메기떡) is a type of tteok (Korean rice cakes) particular to the region of Jeju Island, the largest island of the Korean Peninsula. Its traditional form is actually a by-product of the process of making omegi sul (sul is a Korean word for alcoholic beverages). The modern form of omegi tteok uses entirely different ingredients and is packaged and marketed as "traditional" mainly to be sold as a regional specialty snack for visitors. It is now one of the best selling souvenirs among tourists to Jeju Island.

== Development ==
=== Traditional Variety of Omegi Tteok ===
The main ingredient of the traditional variety of both omegi tteok and omegi sul is a particular type of millet once produced in large quantities in Jeju Island known as chajo (차조). Before the 21st century, a traditional Jeju household would use chajo as a replacement for more difficult to find grains, such as rice or wheat, exemplifying how traditional Jeju cuisine differs from that of the rest of Korea. Because the island's cuisine developed with a more limited variety of food ingredients compared to mainland provinces, some of its traditional food items tend to be less flavorful and more rustic like this traditional variety of omegi tteok. In addition, tteok in general was not made for snacking. Instead, the people of Jeju Island mainly used tteok as an item of sacrifice for the spirits during events like gut (굿, shamanistic rituals). Having such purpose, most traditional Jeju tteok do not have a lot of flavor and are not very marketable in their original form.

The process of making traditional omegi tteok and omegi sul only requires chajo, yeast, and water, although this is no longer the case for most commercially sold omegi tteok nowadays.

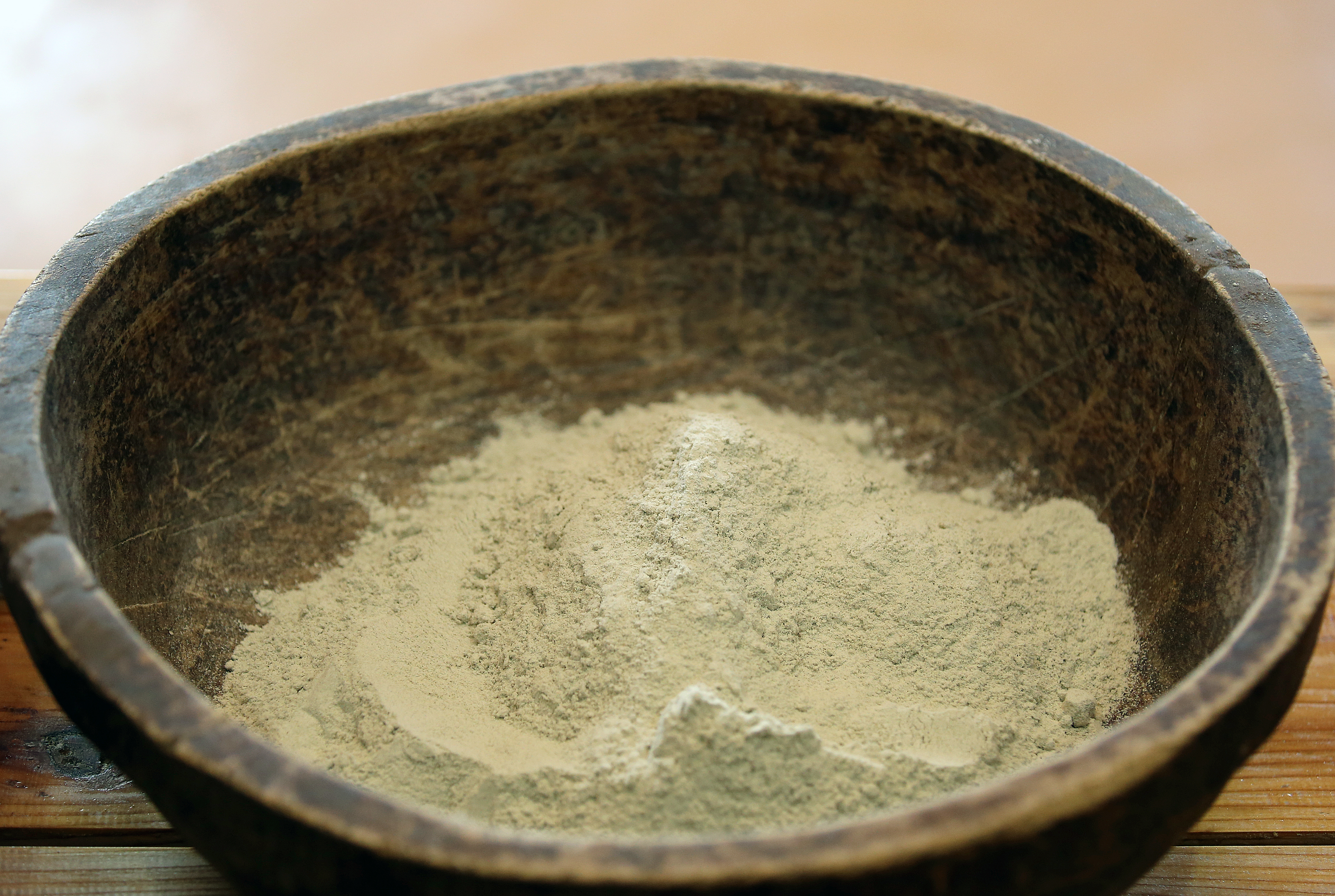
Powdered chajo

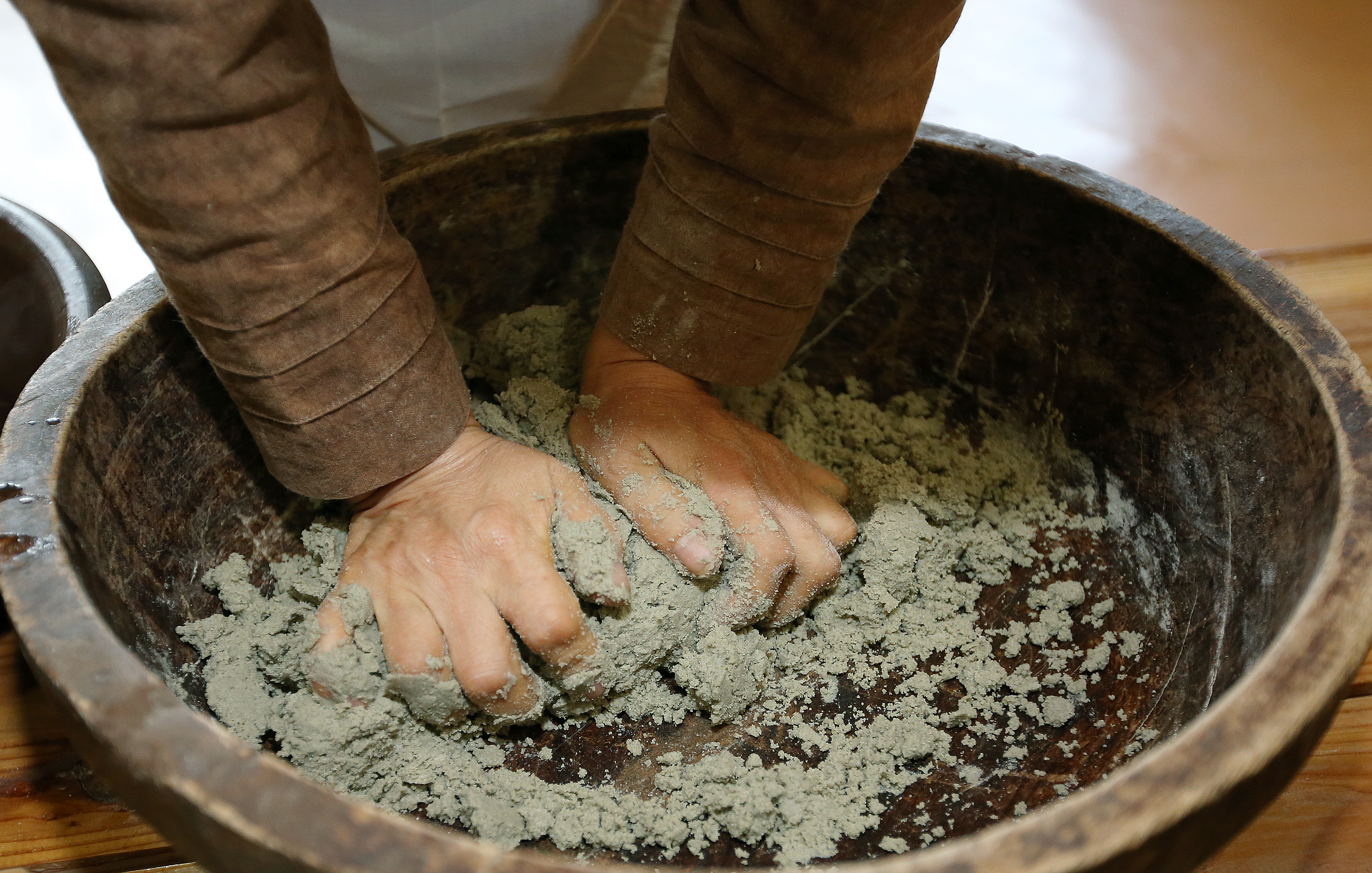
Being kneaded into a dough

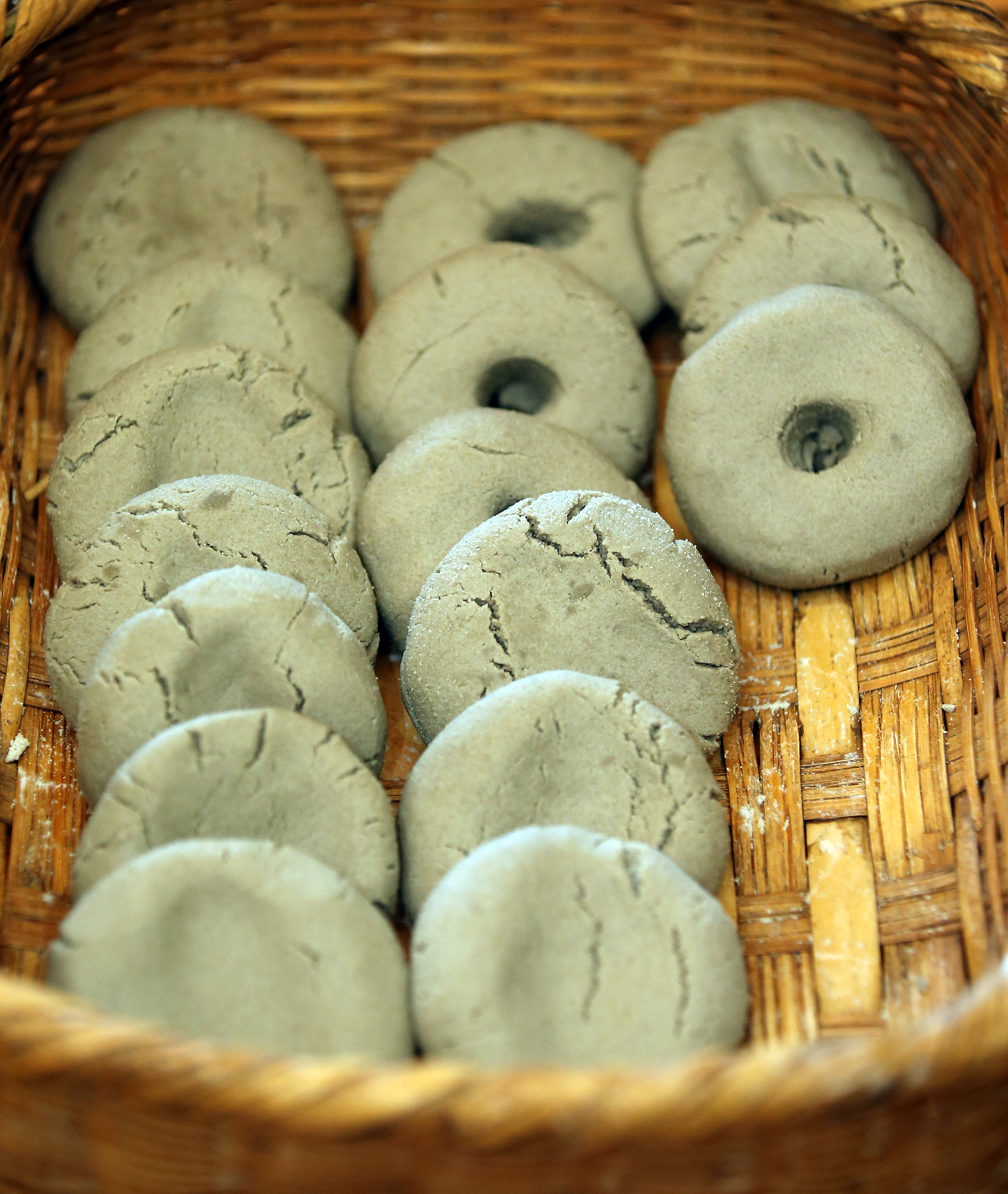
Rolled into small oval shapes with a sunken center

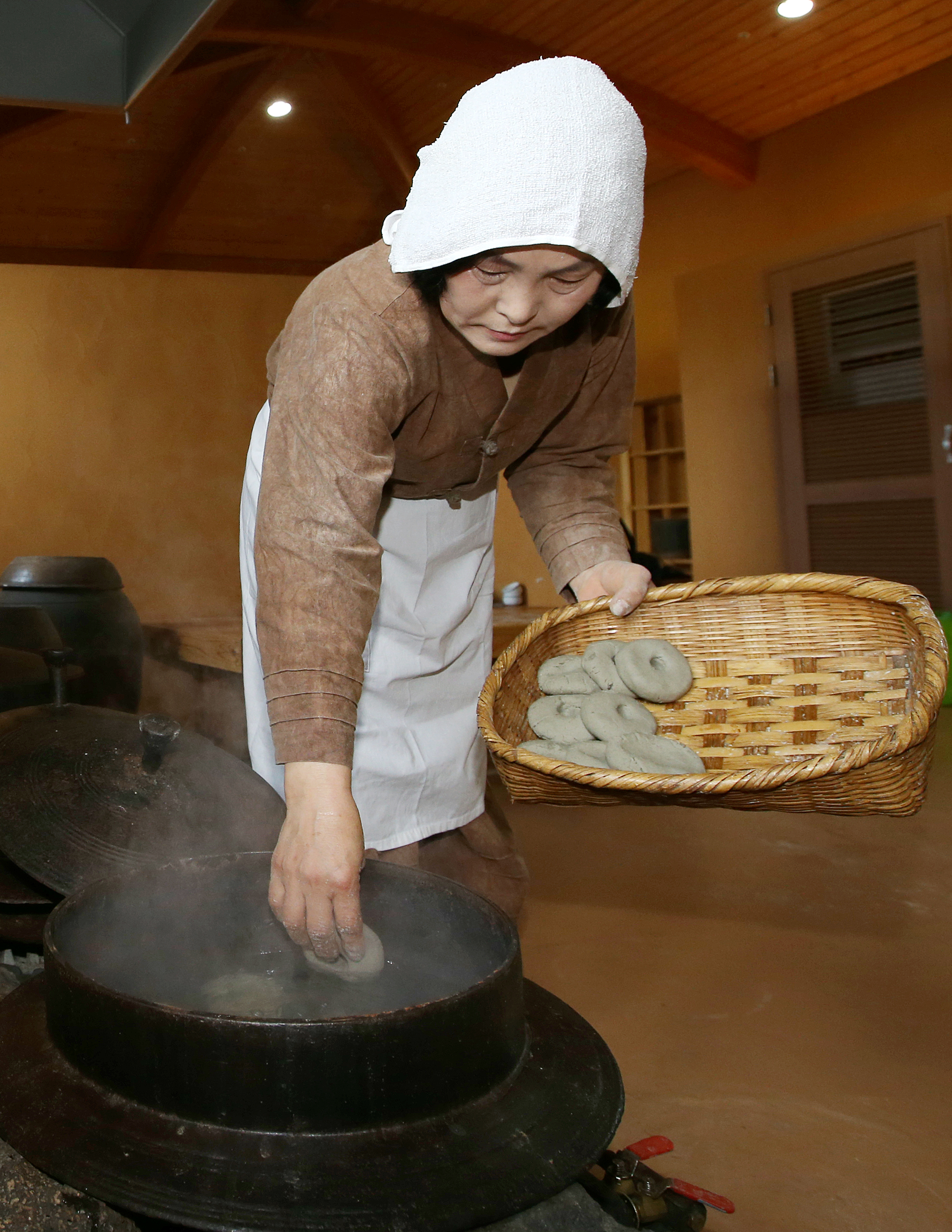
Boiled in water

First, the chajo is soaked in water and ground to produce chajo powder. Then the powder is mixed with water and kneaded into a dough. The dough is then rolled into small oval shapes with a sunken center, much like a small doughnut, to ensure that it cooks thoroughly. Then they are boiled in water. When they rise to the top, the cooked dough is removed from water. It is in this step of the process that some of the cooked dough is set aside to be consumed as omegi tteok. Before giving this cooked chajo dough to children to nibble on as a snack, the parent or the grandparent would roll some of this dough in red bean gomul (고물, ground grain used mostly as topping) in order to prevent the children from burning their tongue. This is the original form of the omegi tteok.

The rest of the cooked dough is kneaded again into a paste-like consistency and mixed with yeast to ferment into omegi sul. The cooked chajo dough is difficult to preserve and becomes hard and inedible quickly. Hence, the modern variety of omegi tteok has changed significantly in both form and taste.

=== Modern Variety of Omegi Tteok ===
The sudden rise of popularity of omegi tteok within the South Korean tourism industry started in the early 2010s. As a result, the look, taste, and makeup of the omegi tteok has changed significantly in recent years, almost to the point of becoming an entirely different variety of tteok. Due to the fact that chajo is no longer produced in large quantity, most store bought omegi tteok do not contain chajo at all. Instead, this new branding of omegi tteok borrows the look, the name and the "traditional branding" of its original counterpart.

In order to cater to changing tastes, the recipe for the modern omegi tteok now uses glutinous rice powder mixed with mugwort and sugar. The rice powder makes the tteok more chewy while the addition of mugwort helps to simulate the green color of the original omegi tteok. The sugar makes it sweeter, allowing omegi tteok to be marketed as a dessert product. The modern mix of ingredients also makes it easier to store and preserve the omegi tteok, so that it can be sold and shipped all over the country. Several vendors are even experimenting with different gomul, such as nuts in place of the ground red bean, or adding foreign flavors like banana into the dough.

== See also ==
- Tteok
- Korean cuisine
- List of Korean desserts
- Korean regional cuisine
