= Usu (mortar) =

Japanese mortar used to pound rice or millet

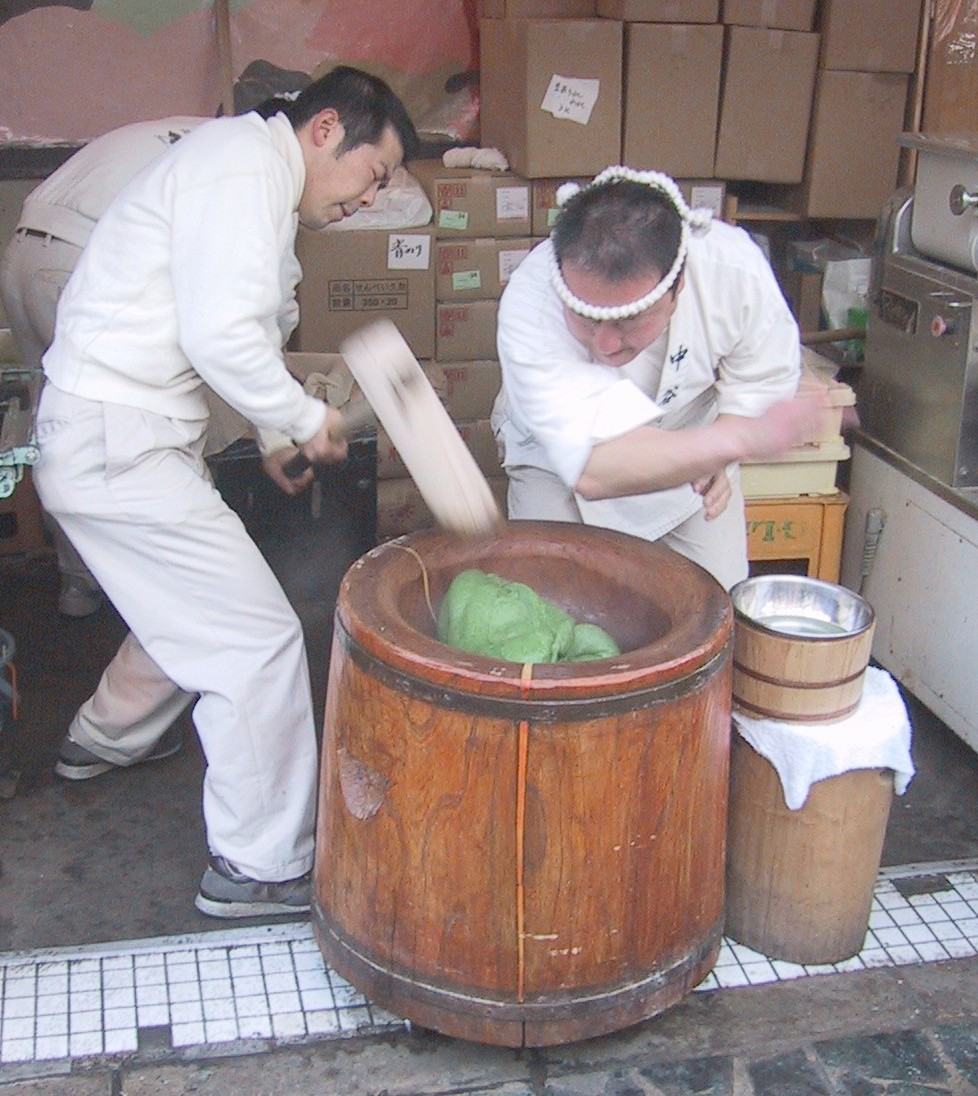
Making mochi in an usu. The timing is important to avoid injury.

An usu (Japanese: [ɯꜜsɯ], Japanese: 臼) is a large Japanese stamp mill with a pestle called kine ([kiꜜne], Japanese: 杵), used to pound rice or millet.

While the function of an usu is similar to the smaller suribachi and surikogi mortars, the shape is very different, as the usu usually lacks the rough pattern in the bowl, and has a differently shaped pestle which is used in a different manner.

== Appearance ==
The usu is usually about one meter high (including pedestal) and has a diameter of about 30 cm (12 in). The usu is usually made of wood or stone. The kine is a long wooden mallet with a length exceeding one meter. The usu is usually operated by two people at the same time. One person swings the kine to pound the rice in a similar motion to chopping wood. It is physically demanding work and is usually done by men who often chant to keep time. Between each swing, another person puts his hand in the bowl to turn the rice. Timing is critical for safe operation of the usu.

== Use ==
The most common use of an usu is to pound steamed glutinous rice into a very sticky mass in order to produce mochi. It is still frequently used in Japan in traditional restaurants and also sometimes in traditional, rural, or wealthier private households. Especially around New Year they are used by companies and organizations to make mochi together and distribute it to the employees to strengthen the group spirit.

== See also ==
- Jeolgu, Korean equivalent of usu
- List of Japanese cooking utensils
