= Jeolgu =

Traditional Korean mortar and pestle set

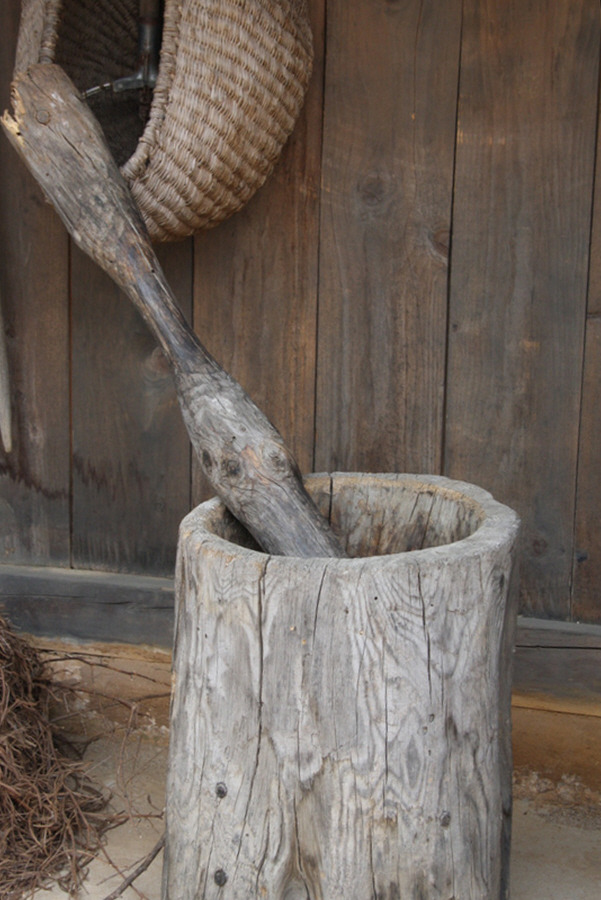
- Wooden jeolgu (mortar) and gongi (pestle)

Korean name
- Hangul: 절구
- RR: jeolgu
- MR: chŏlgu
- IPA: [tɕʌl.ɡu]

Gongi
- Hangul: 공이
- RR: gongi
- MR: kongi
- IPA: [koŋ.i]

Jeolgu (Korean: 절구) and gongi (공이) are a type of traditional Korean mortar and pestle set, used for pounding grains or tteok (rice cake). They can be made with timber, stone, or iron. Jeolgu is a bowl-shaped vessel in which grains or tteok can be pounded, and gongi refers to either a pestle for a mortar or a stamper for a stamp mill.

== Gallery ==
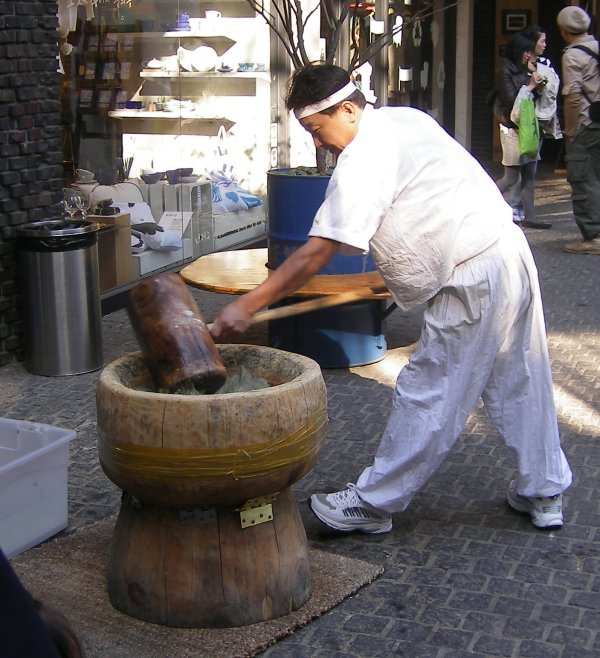
Pounding tteok (rice cake) in jeolgu (mortar) with tteokme (mallet)

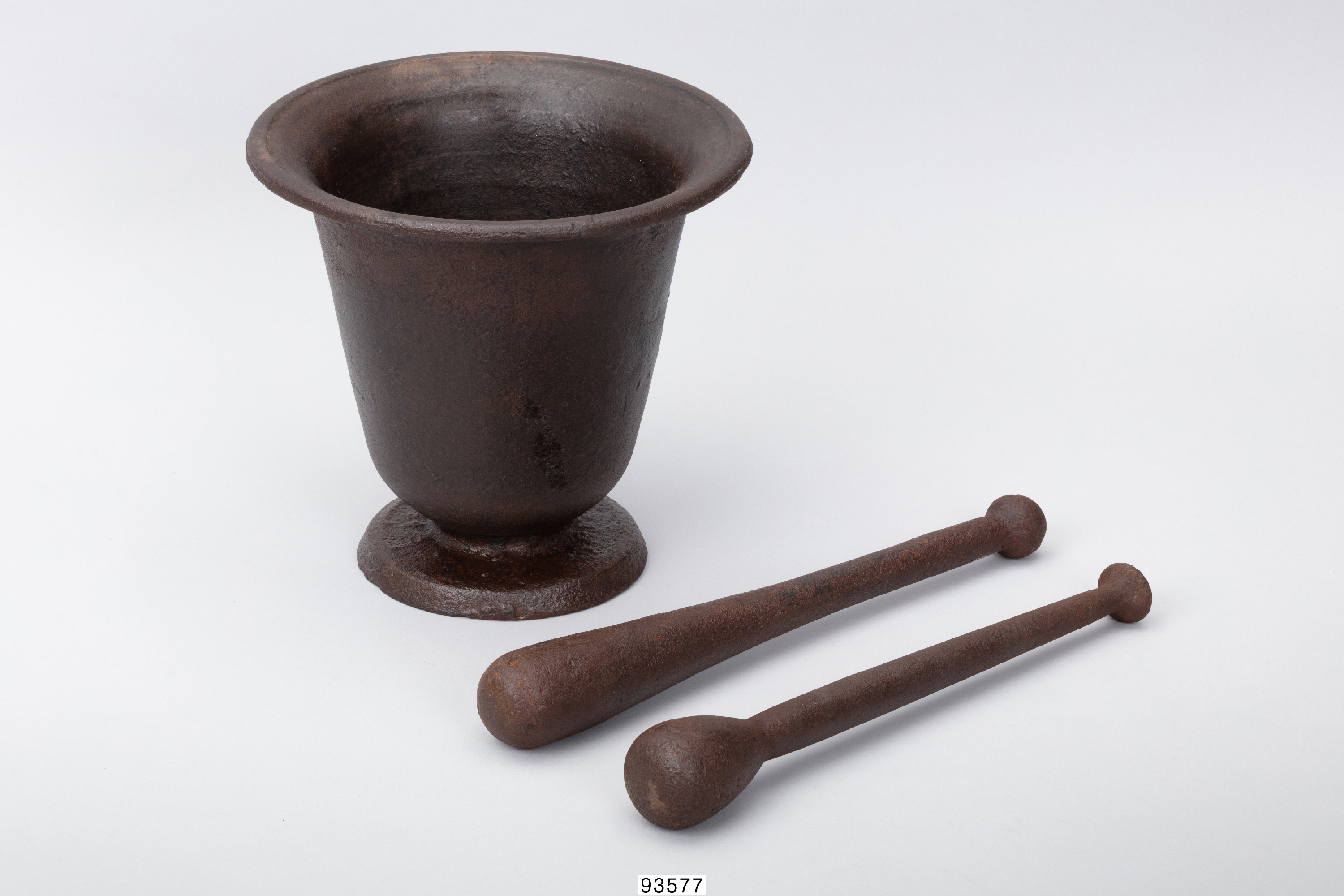

== See also ==
- Usu, Japanese equivalent of jeolgu
- Tteok
- Maetdol
