= Jeungpyeon =

Korean rice cake variety

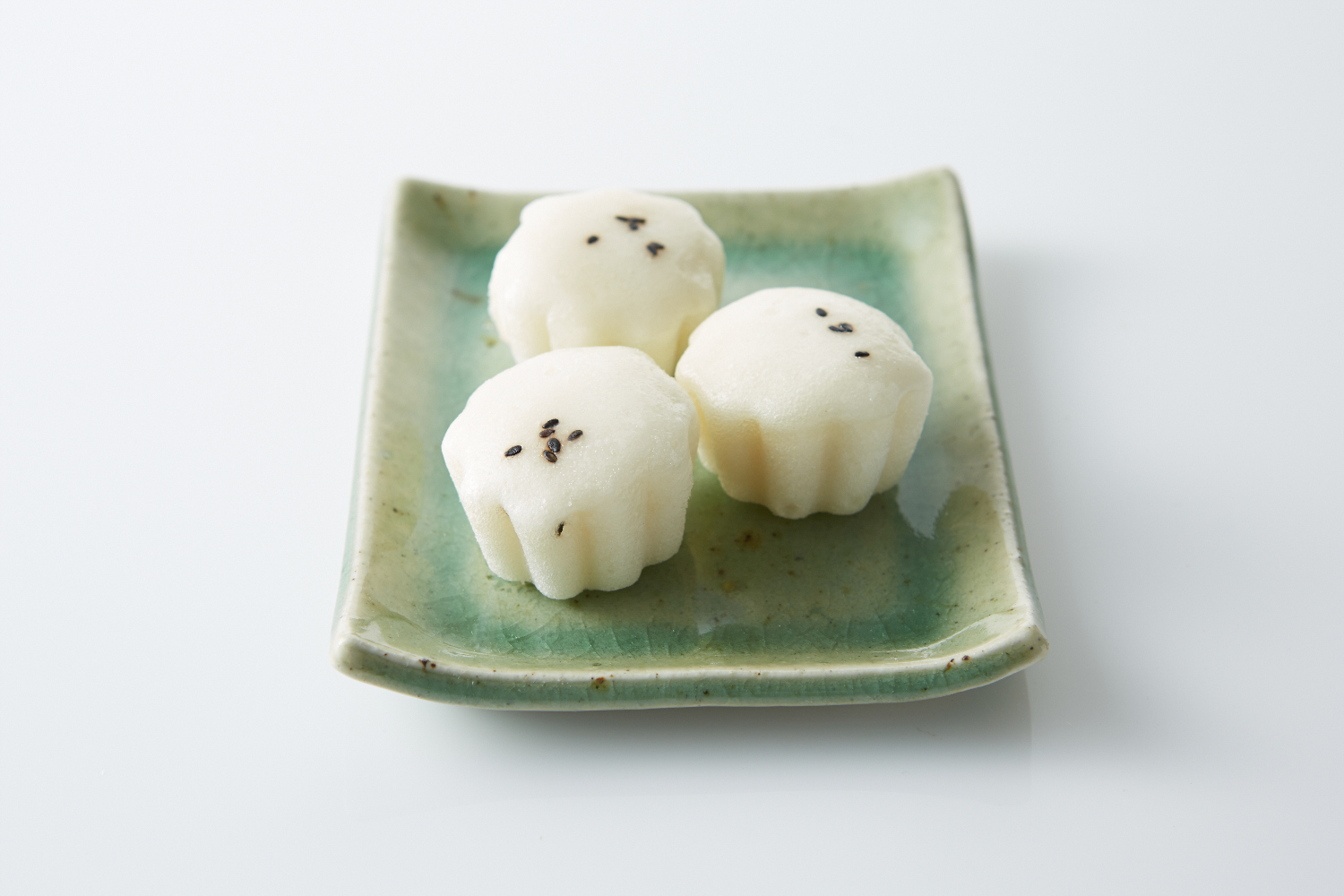
- Jeungpyeon topped with black sesame seeds
- Alternative names: Sultteok
- Type: Tteok
- Place of origin: Korea
- Associated cuisine: Korean cuisine
- Serving temperature: 15–25 °C (59–77 °F)
- Main ingredients: Rice flour, makgeolli
- Food energy (per 4 serving): 200 kcal (840 kJ)

Korean name
- Hangul: 증편
- Hanja: 蒸편
- RR: jeungpyeon
- MR: chŭngp'yŏn
- IPA: [tɕɯŋ.pʰjʌn]

Alternate name
- Hangul: 술떡
- RR: sultteok
- MR: sulttŏk
- IPA: [sul.t͈ʌk̚]

Jeungpyeon (Korean: 증편), also called sultteok (술떡), is a variety of tteok (rice cake) made by steaming rice flour dough prepared with makgeolli (rice wine).

== Preparation ==
Sieved non-glutinous rice flour is mixed with hot makgeolli (rice wine), covered, and left to swell up in a warm room. Risen dough is mixed again to draw out the air bubbles, covered, and let rise once more. It is then steamed in jeungpyeon mold, with toppings such as pine nuts, black sesame, julienned jujubes, julienned rock tripe, chrysanthemum petals, and cockscomb petals.

== History ==
Jeungpyeon is called by various names such as gijeungtteog, gijitteog, sultteog, beong-geojitteog.
