= Anban (utensil) =

Korean cooking utensil

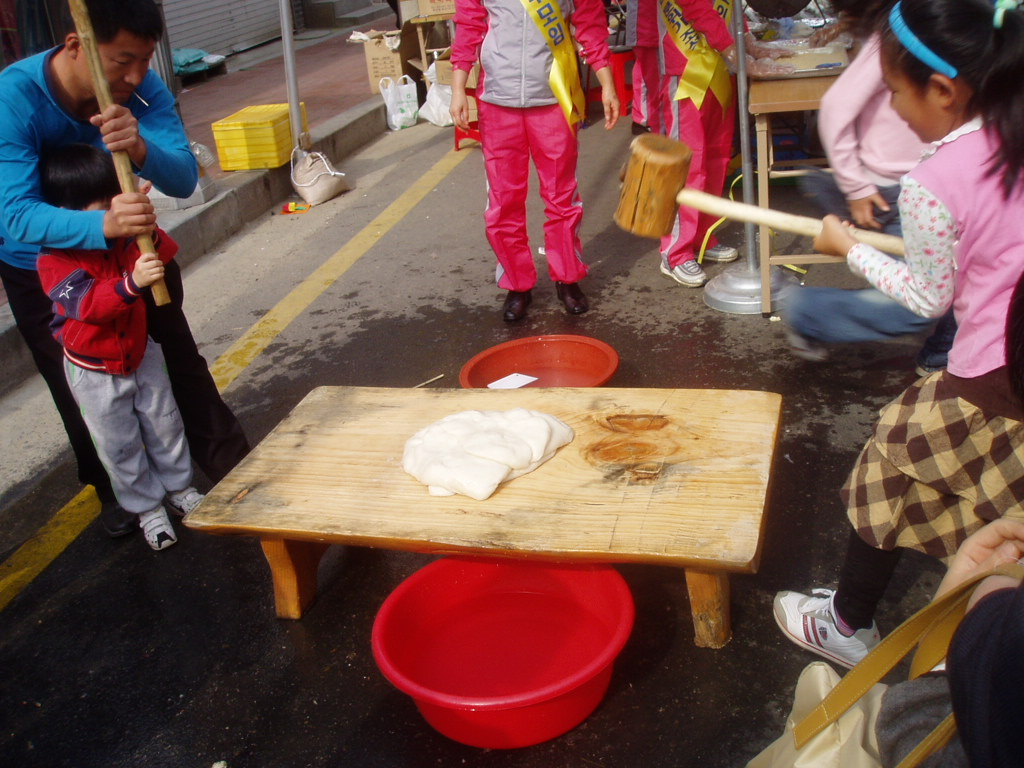
Korean children making tteok using anban and tteokme.

Anban (Korean: 안반; Hanja: 案盤) is a traditional Korean cooking utensil used to make rice cakes known as tteok. It consists of a wooden board usually measuring 1m wide, 1.5m long, and 15–20 cm thick, with short legs attached on its corners for support. It is accompanied by a tteokme (떡메), a wooden pounding mallet made from a thick, short log with a handle attached. When making tteok, the rice cake is placed on the anban and pounded with a tteokme.

Depending on the region, anban is also known as byeongan (병안; 餠案) or tteokban (떡반; 떡盤). A variant of anban consists of a long, narrow wooden board measuring 2m wide and 50 cm long, with one side left flat and another side hollowed out, the latter of which the rice cake is to be placed.

During the Joseon period, anban and tteokme are common household items, but in modern times it is much less widespread in the advent of mechanical rice mills. Anban is still used to make tteok the traditional way, and also in Korean Chinese restaurants to knead dough and stretch noodles. Anban made with zelkova wood is regarded as having the highest quality, as with tteokme made with Hwangyang wood (황양목; 黃楊木), a variant of Buxus sinica found in Korea. (Note: Hwangyang wood is also known as Hoeyang wood (회양목; 淮陽木).) However, anban made with pine wood is also widely used because it rarely splits or cracks.

== Proverb ==
The Korean proverb 숙수가 안반만 나무란다 (suksuga anbanman namuranda) literally translates to "the cook-in-charge criticizes the anban", which means that someone who lacks of skill does not blame his inability for the failure; he blames the tool instead. Similar sayings include:

- "쟁기질 못하는 놈이 소를 탓한다", meaning "he who cannot plow blames the ox";
- "굿 못하는 무당 장구만 타박한다", meaning "the shaman who cannot do good hits the janggu".
