= Baekseolgi =

Korean rice cake variety

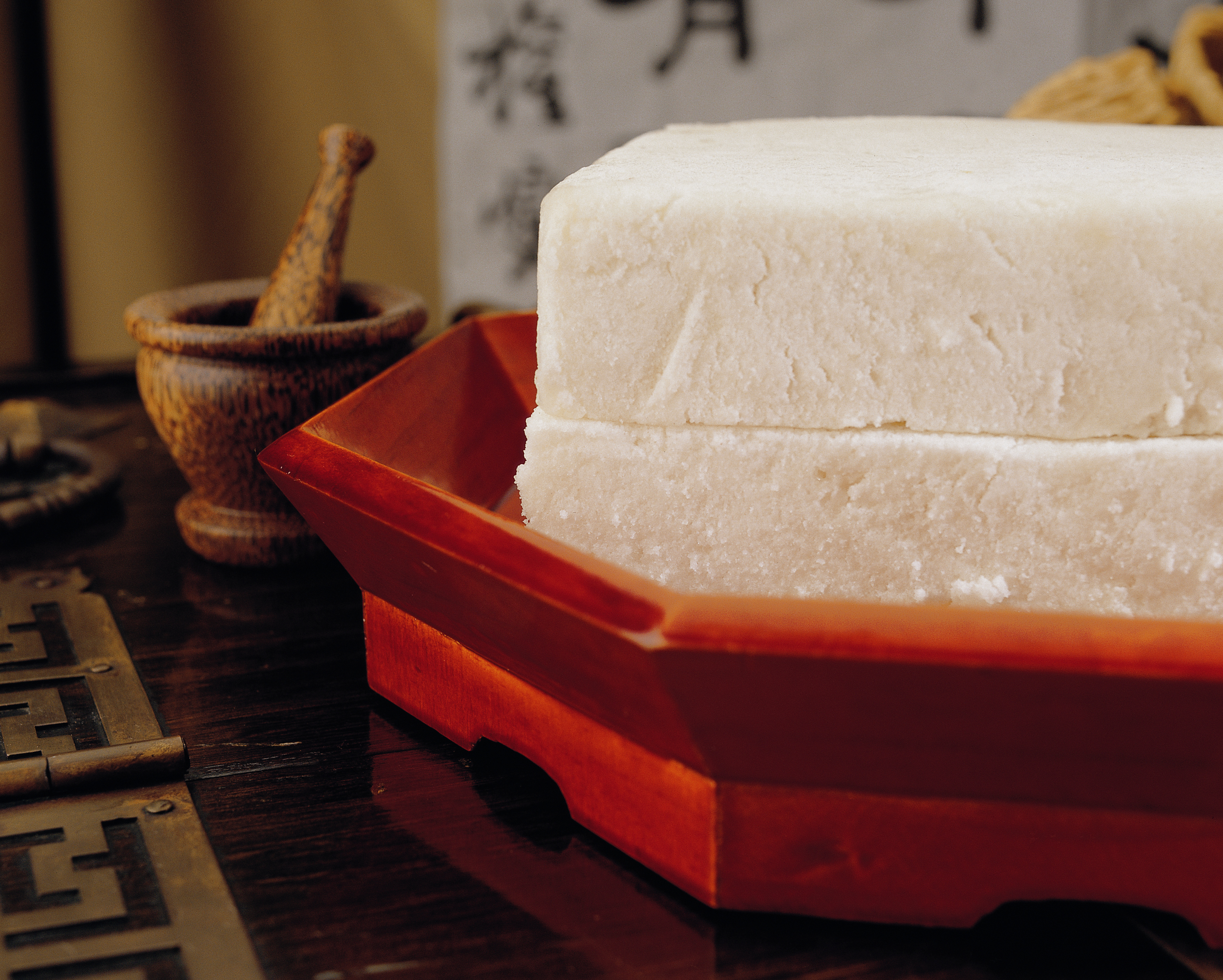
- Type: Tteok
- Place of origin: Korea
- Main ingredients: Rice flour, sugar, salt

Baekseolgi (Korean: 백설기) is a kind of rice cake (tteok) made of rice flour dough. It originated in Korea and is a prime part of Korean culture. A Baekseolgi contains rice flour, sugar, and salt. It is usually eaten on the special occasions among Korean people, such as the 100th day of an infant after birth. The cakes are colored white, a color that symbolizes purity and holiness. The cakes are shared with neighbors or friends on the 100th day (baegil), but not on samchiril (the 21st day).

== See also ==
- Korean cuisine
- Tteok
- Sirutteok
