= Siru =

Earthenware steamer in Korean cuisine

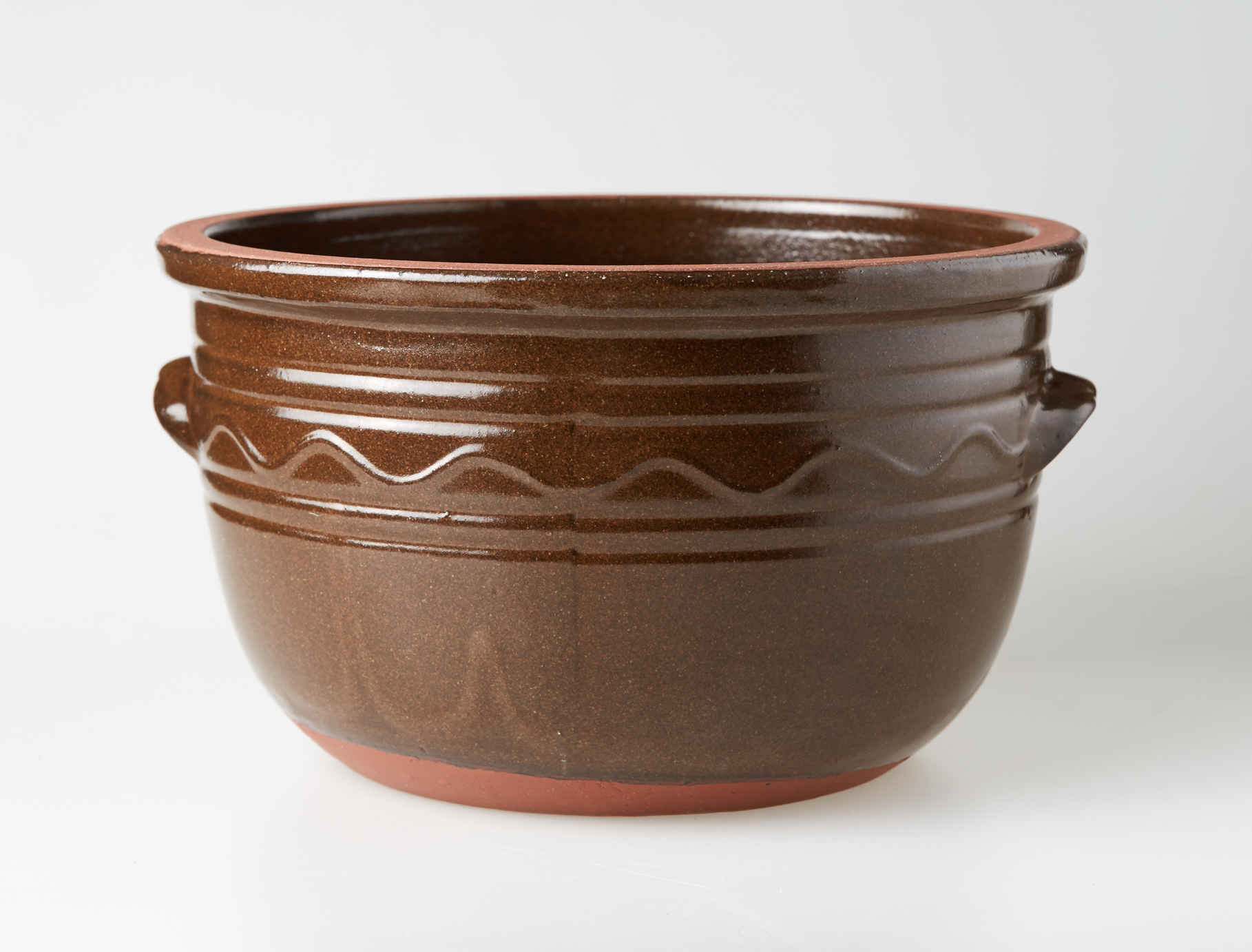
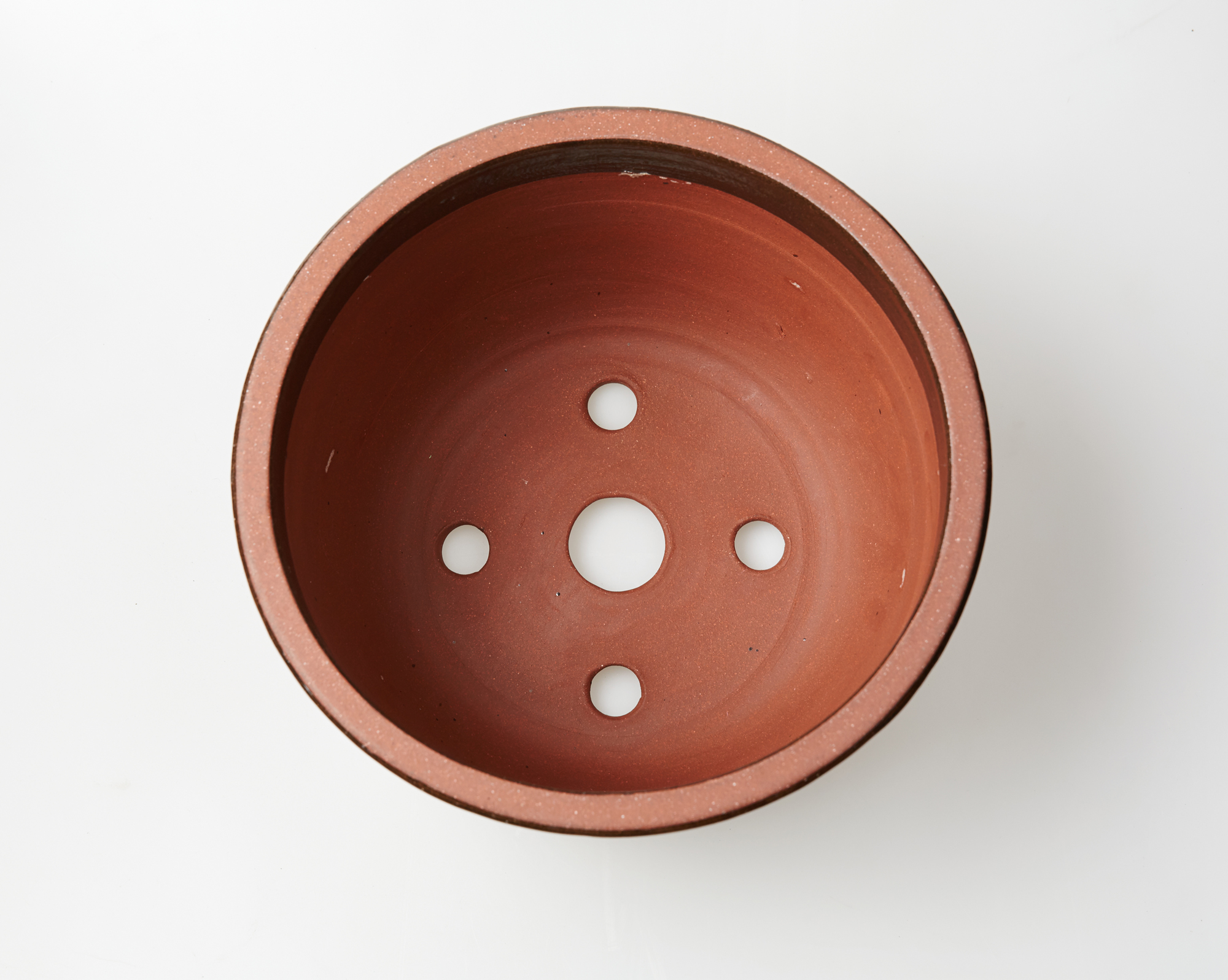

Korean name
- Hangul: 시루
- RR: siru
- MR: siru
- IPA: [ɕi.ɾu]

Siru (Korean: 시루) is an earthenware steamer used to steam grain or grain flour dishes such as tteok (rice cakes), most notably siru-tteok. The siru is an earthenware steaming vessel that dates back to the late bronze age of the Korean northern peninsula and the use of the utensil spread to the entire peninsula by the time of the Three Kingdoms in which the popularity of siru-tteok grew. The siru is also used during shamanic rituals and is even offered on the tables for daegamsin (대감신; 大監神, state official God). The siru is not an everyday utensil but is one for preparing and serving the sacrificial dishes during rituals.

A siru consists of a handle, a body, and a bottom with holes, so that when placed above a fire, steam can easily reach the contents inside. The size of the bottom and the diameter of the siru is generally the same, and the size of the siru each have significance: large siru are for worshipping seongju (성주; 城主), the deity that protects the household, medium siru are for worshipping teoju (터주; ─主), the deity that oversees the peace of the household, and small siru are used to steam white rice.

Besides earthenware, siru can be made with porcelain or bronze; earthenware is commonly used in the central region while ceramic siru is common in the south.

== Gallery ==
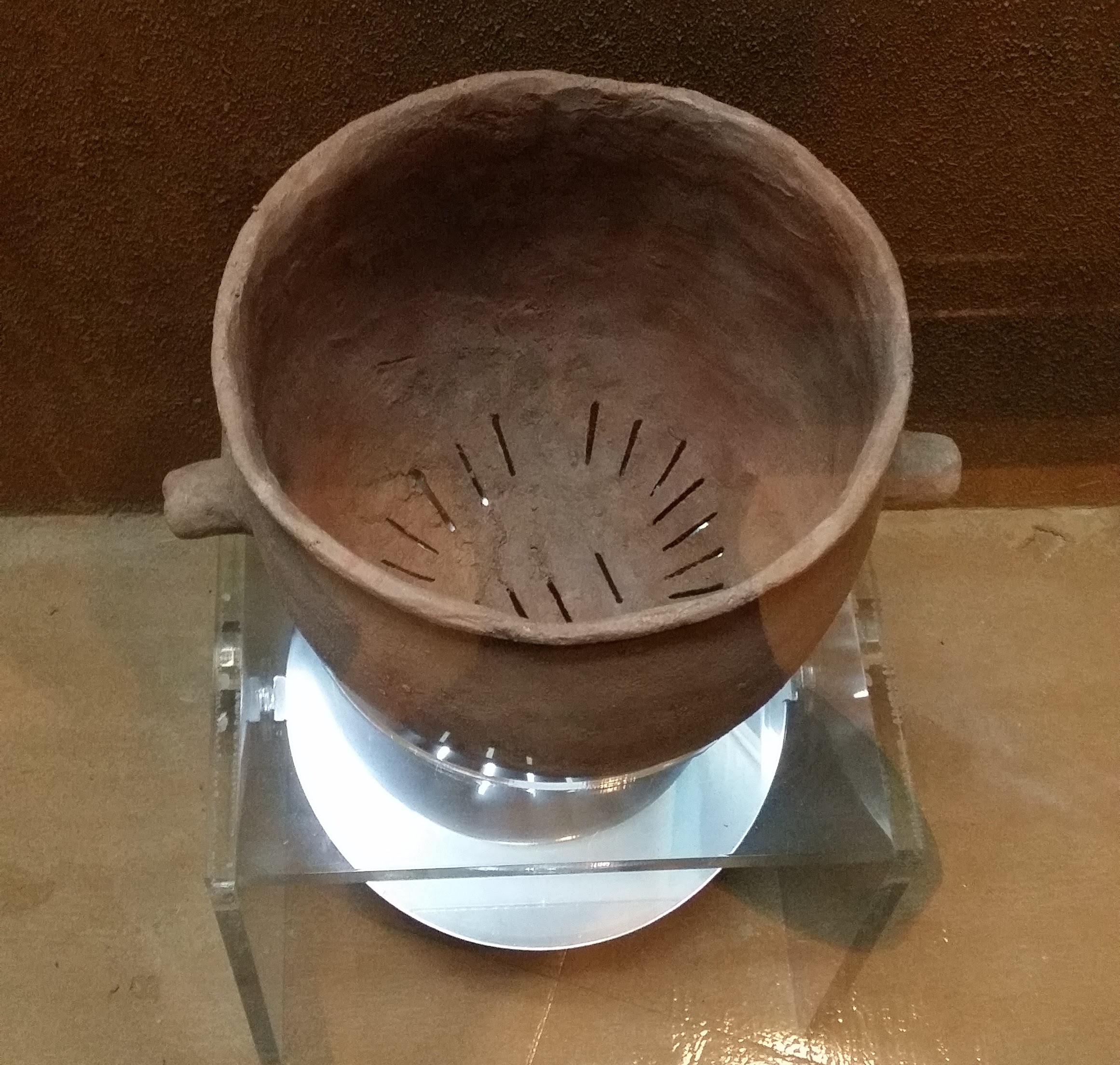
A Bronze Age siru

== See also ==
- List of cooking vessels
- Bamboo steamer
- Siru-tteok
