= Bupyeon =

Korean rice cake variety

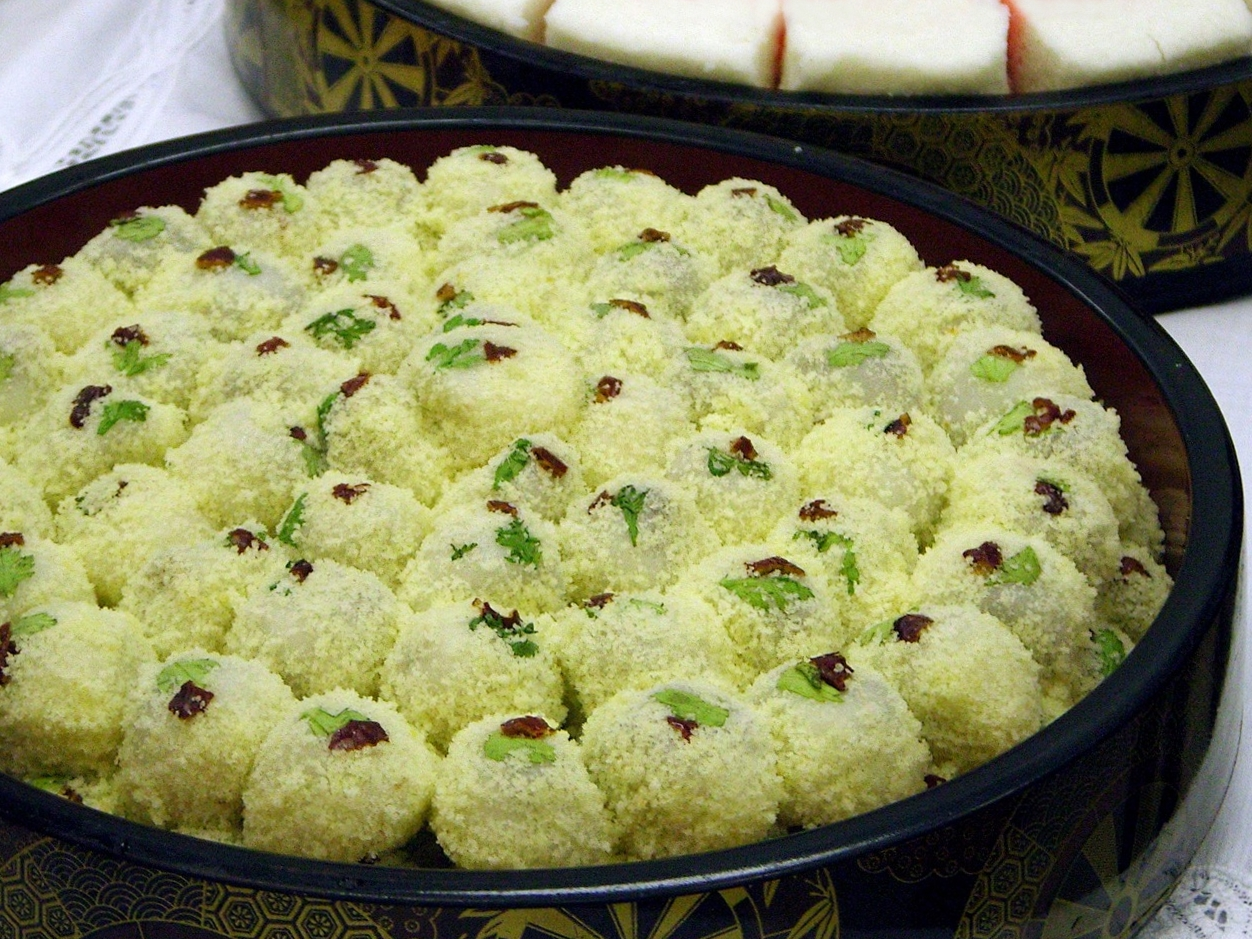
- Bupyeon at a doljanchi (first-birthday party)
- Type: Tteok
- Place of origin: Korea
- Region or state: Gyeongsang Province
- Associated cuisine: Korean cuisine
- Main ingredients: Glutinous rice flour

Korean name
- Hangul: 부편
- RR: bupyeon
- MR: pup'yŏn
- IPA: pu.pʰjʌn

Bupyeon (Korean: 부편) is a type of steamed tteok (rice cake) used in traditional Korean weddings. It is a local specialty of Miryang, South Gyeongsang Province.

== Preparation ==
Glutinous rice flour is kneaded with boiling water and rolled into small round cakes with fillings made of toasted soybean powder, cinnamon powder, and honey. The cakes are then coated with white gomul (dressing powder) made with geopi-pat (husked adzuki beans, often the black variety), garnished with thin strips of jujube or gotgam (dried persimmon), and steamed in siru (steamer).

== See also ==
- Danja
- Gyeongdan
