= List of Gyeongsang dishes =

This is a list of typical Gyeongsang Province dishes found in Korean cuisine.

== Main dishes ==
- Heotjesabap (헛제사밥), literally "fake jesa food"
- Jinju bibimbap (진주비빔밥), literally "mixed rice of Jinju"
- Tongyeong bibimbap (통영비빔밥), literally "mixed rice of Tongyeong"
- Mubap (무밥), made with rice and radish
- Gaengsik (갱식)
- Aehobokjuk (애호박죽) zucchini porridge
- Tteokguk (떡국), rice cake made with garaetteok

=== Noodles ===
- Milmyeon (밀면, 밀국수냉면), cold noodle soup made with wheat flour
- Dak kalguksu (닭칼국수), hot noodle soup made with chicken
- Geonjin guksu (건진국수)
- Jogae guksu (조개국수), hot noodle soup made with clams

== Challyu ==
=== Soups and stews ===
- Jaecheopguk (재첩국)
- Gyesamtang (계삼탕)
- Godongguk (고동국)
- Chueotang (추어탕)
- Seonjitguk (선짓국)
- Dongtae gomyeong jijim (동태고명지짐)
  - Bugeo miyeokguk (북어미역국)
  - Deulkkae chamkkae miyeokguk (들깨참깨미역국)
  - Mareunhonghap miyeokguk (마른홍합미역국)

=== Steamed dishes ===
- Andong jjimdak (찜닭)
- Ureong jjim (우렁찜)
- Dadatge jjim (바닷게찜)
- Mideodeok jjim (미더덕찜)
- Agujjim (아구찜)
- Hobakseon (호박선)

=== Braised and stir-fried dishes ===
- Jangeo jorim (장어조림)
- Haemul japchae (해물잡채)

=== Gui ===
- Ojingeo bulgogi (오징어불고기)
- Sangeo dombaegi gui (상어돔배기구이)
- Galchi gui (갈치구이)
- Cheongeo gui (청어구이)
- Gaetjangeo gui (갯장어구이)
- Yugwak (유곽)

=== Pancakes ===
- Sangeo dombaegi jeon (상어돔배기전)
- Baechujeok (배추적)
- Gimbuchigae (김부치개)
- Pajeon (파전)

=== Hoe ===
- Haepari hoe (해파리회)
- Pijogae hoe (피조개회)
- Gwangeo hoe (광어회)
- Meongge hoe (멍게회)
- Jangeo hoe (장어회)
- Ureong hoe (우렁회)
- Saengmyeolchi hoe (생멸치회)
- Ingeo hoe (잉어회)

=== Dried fish ===
- Salted Mackerel (간고등어)
- Yakdaegupo (약대구포)
- Bungeopo (붕어포)

=== Vegetables ===
- Mareun muneossam (마른문어쌈
- Siraegi doenjang muchim (시래기된장무침)
- Sangchu geotjeori (상추겉절이)
- Kkoltugi musaengchae (꼴뚜기무생채)
- Totnamul (톳나물)
- Dubu saengchae (두부생채)
- Cheonggak muchim (청각무침)
- Dotnamul muchim (돋나물무침)

=== Kimchi ===
- Putmaneul geotjeori (풋마늘겉절이)
- Sokkeumbaechu geotjeori (솎음배추겉절이)
- Baechu ssam (배추쌈)
- Jeonbok kimchi (전복김치)
- Sokse kimchi (속세 김치)
- Kongnip kimchi (콩잎김치)
- Ueong kimchi (우엉김치)
- Buchu kimchi (부추김치)
- Ueongnip jaban (우엉잎자반)

=== Fried dishes ===
- Gochu bugak (고추부각)
- Gamja bugak (감자부각)
- Kkolttugi twigim (꼴뚜기튀김)
- Memilmuk (메밀묵)

== Rice cakes ==
- Mosiip songpyeon (모시잎송편)
- Mitbiji (밀비지)
- Mangyeong tteok (만경떡)
- Ssukgullae (쑥굴래)
- Japgwapyeon (잡과편)
- Jatguri (잣구리)
- Bupyeon (부편)
- Gamja songpyeon (감자송편)
- Chiktteok (칡떡)
- Seolgi tteok (설기떡)
- Pyeon tteok (편떡)
- Gyeongdan (경단)

== Dessert ==
=== Hangwa ===
- Yugwa (유과)
- Jujugangban (준주강반)
- Daechu jingjo (대추징조)
- Gangnaengi yeot (강냉이엿)
- Ueong jeonggwa (우엉정과)
- Dasima jeonggwa (다시마정과)
- Gaksaek jeonggwa (각색정과)

=== Non-alcoholic beverages ===
- Dansul (단술)
- Sujeonggwa (수정과)
- Yuja-hwachae (유자화채)
- Yuja-cha (유자차)
- Eureum-subak (얼음수박)
- Japgok-misutgaru (잡곡미숫가루)
- Mul-sikhye (물식혜)
- Chapssal-sikhye (찹쌀식혜)
- Andong-sikhye (안동식혜)

== See also ==
- Korean cuisine
- Korean royal court cuisine
- Korean temple cuisine
- List of Korean dishes
