= Gomul =

Edible powders in Korean cuisine

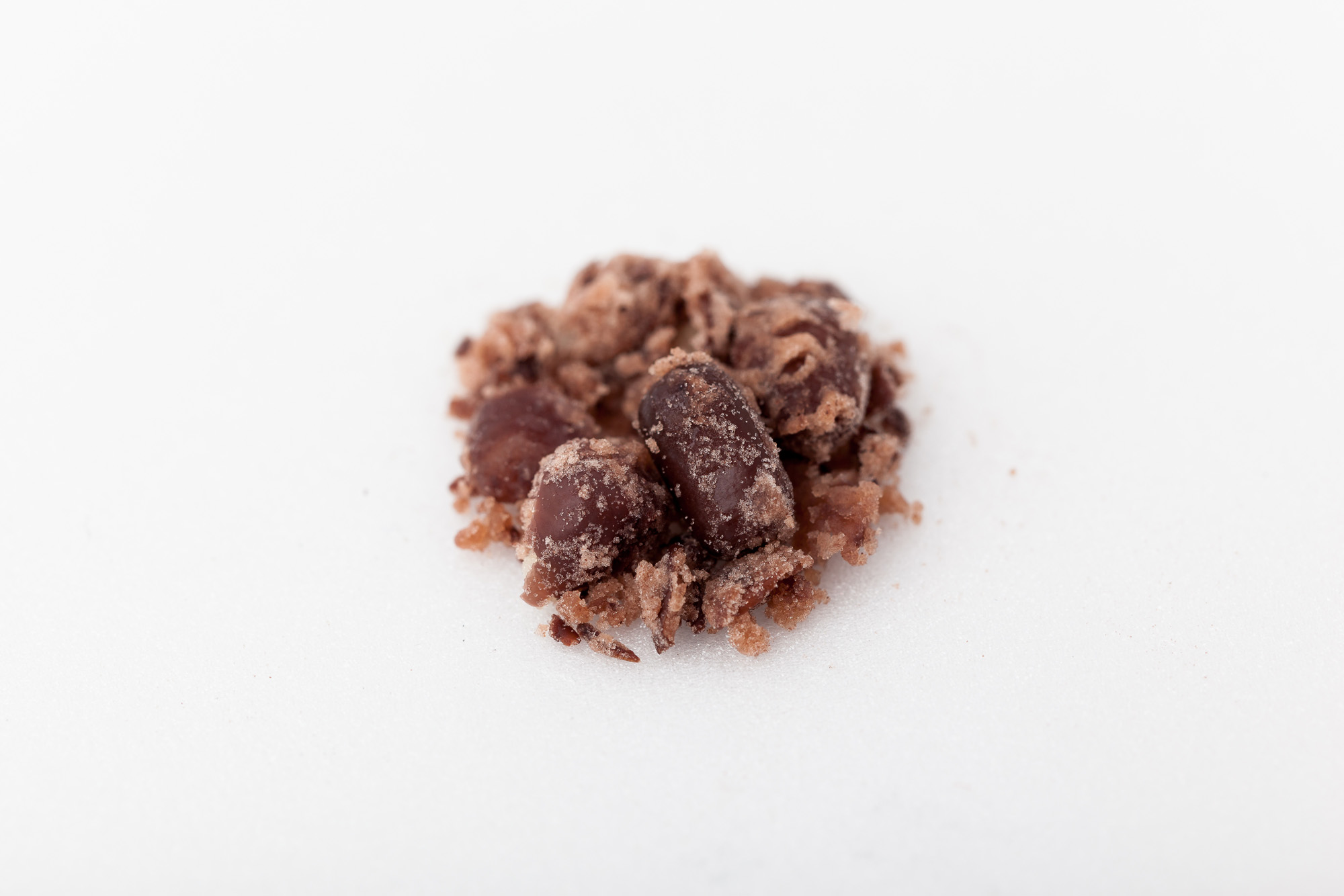
- Pat-gomul (adzuki bean powder)
- Alternative names: Dressing powder
- Place of origin: Korea
- Associated cuisine: Korean cuisine

Korean name
- Hangul: 고물
- RR: gomul
- MR: komul
- IPA: [ko.mul]

Gomul (Korean: 고물) refers to a number of powdered coatings, toppings, fillings, or dips in Korean cuisine.

== Uses ==
Gomul is used to improve the appearance and taste of tteok (rice cake), including injeolmi, danja, and gyeongdan, as well as between-layer fillings for siru-tteok (steamed rice cake). It helps with even cooking of steamed rice cakes, being the less dense layer (compared to the rice flour layer, that tend to turn stickier as it steams) through which steam passes more easily.

Gomul is also used for topping bingsu (shaved ice). Soybean gomul is sometimes served with grilled samgyeopsal (pork belly), with meat dipped in the soybean powder when eaten.

== Varieties and preparation ==
Red bean or mung bean gomul is used in winter, while soybean or sesame gomul, which do not spoil as fast, are preferred in summer.

Common varieties and their preparation are:

- Bam-gomul (밤고물; "chestnut strands/flakes or powder") – chestnuts are shelled and sliced into thin strands or flakes. Alternatively, they can be cooked, shelled, mashed, and sieved through a coarse strainer into powder.
- Daechu-gomul (대추고물; "jujube strands/flakes") – jujubes are peeled, and the skin part is sliced into thin strands or flakes.
- Dongbu-gomul (동부고물; "cowpea powder") – the white gomul is made with cowpeas.
  - Geopipat-gomul (거피팥고물; "hulled red bean powder") – to make the white gomul, red beans (often the black cultivar) are ground in a millstone, soaked in tepid water for five to six hours, husked, and steamed in siru. When properly cooked, the beans are salted, mashed, sieved, and pan-fried without oil over a low heat.
- Kkae-gomul (깨고물; "sesame powder") – sesame is washed, husked, pan-fried without oil, and used whole or coarsely ground with mortar and pestle.
  - Heugimja-gomul (흑임자고물; "black sesame powder") – black sesame is prepared in the same way as for sesame.
- Kong-gomul (콩고물; "soybean powder") – the yellow gomul is made by washing, draining, and roasting soybeans, then mashing them with ginger, garlic, and salt. It is then sieved to desired fineness: coarse kong-gomul typically used to coat injeolmi, and coarse kong-gomul to fill and top siru-tteok.
- Nokdu-gomul (녹두고물; "mung bean powder") – the pale yellow gomul is made with mung beans in the same way that geopipat-gomul is made.
- Pat-gomul (팥고물; "red bean powder") – to make the dark red gomul, unhusked red beans are boiled in three parts water, drained when 80% cooked, and left to steam for a long time. When properly cooked without excess moisture, it is salted and mashed.
- Seogi-gomul (석이고물; "rock tripe strands/flakes") – rock tripe is sliced into thin strands or flakes.

== Gallery ==
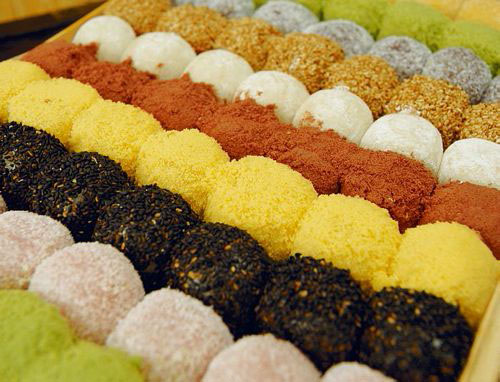
Gyeongdan coated with various gomul

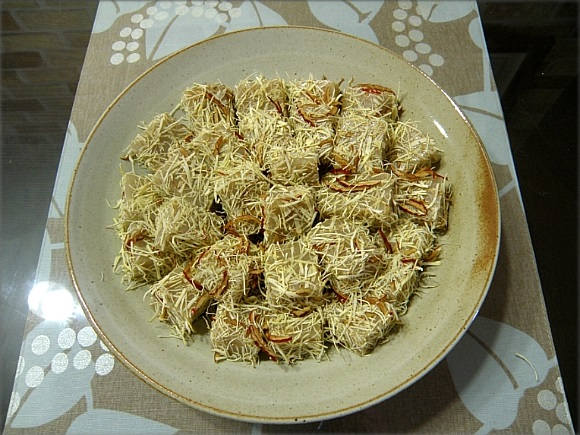
Danja coated with bam-daechu-gomul (chestnut and jujube strands)

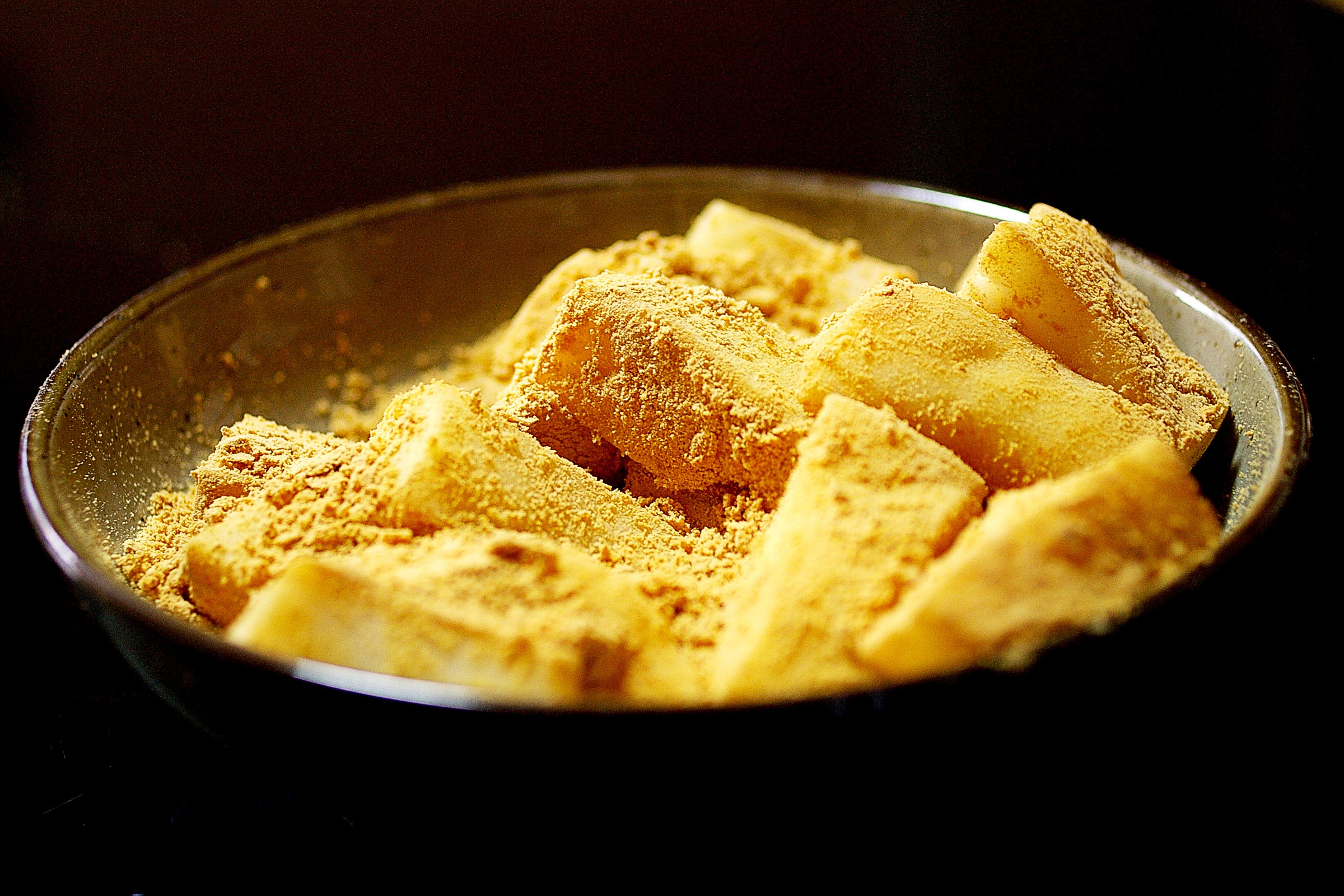
Injeolmi coated with kong-gomul (soybean powder)

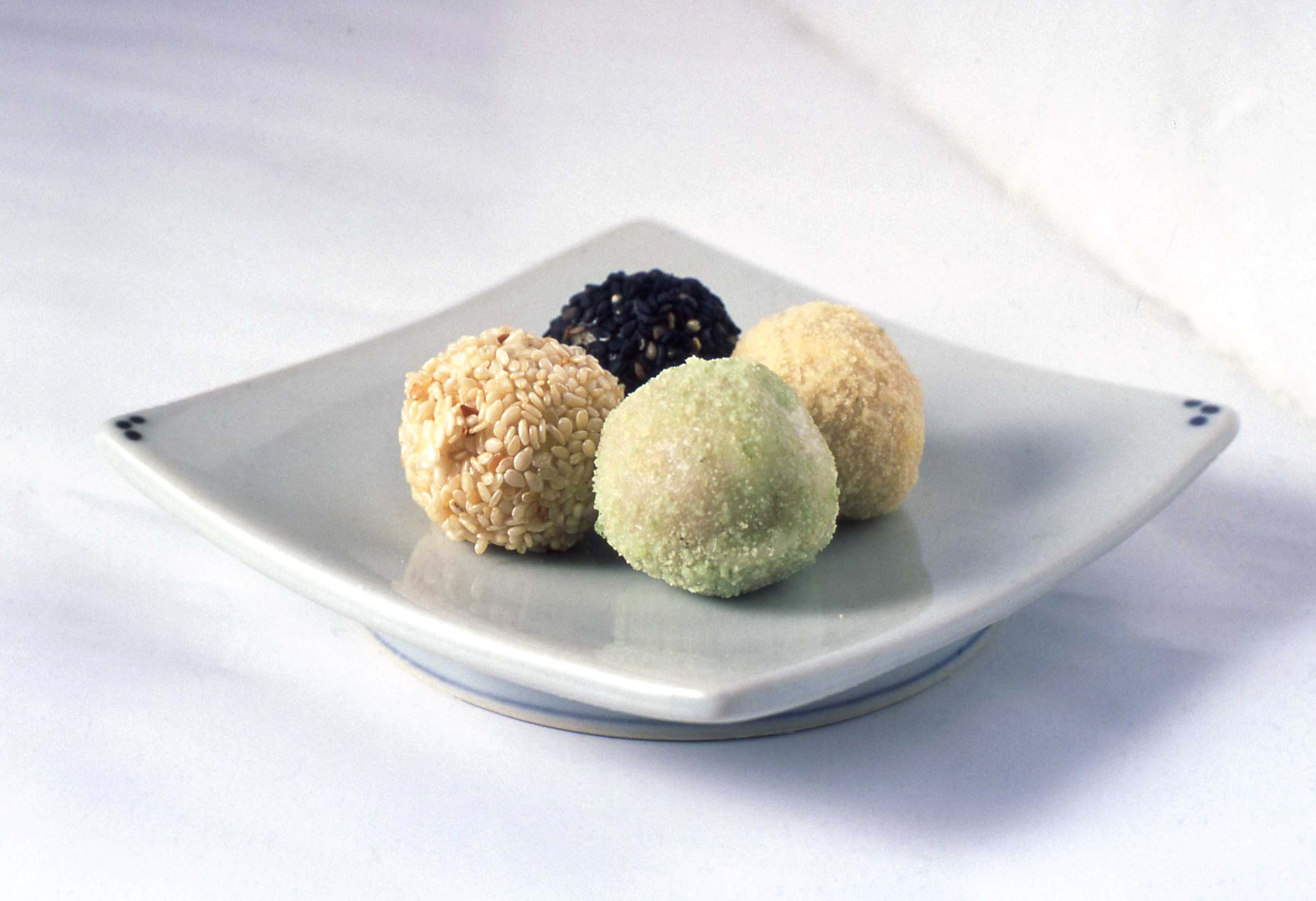
Gyeongdan coated with gomul

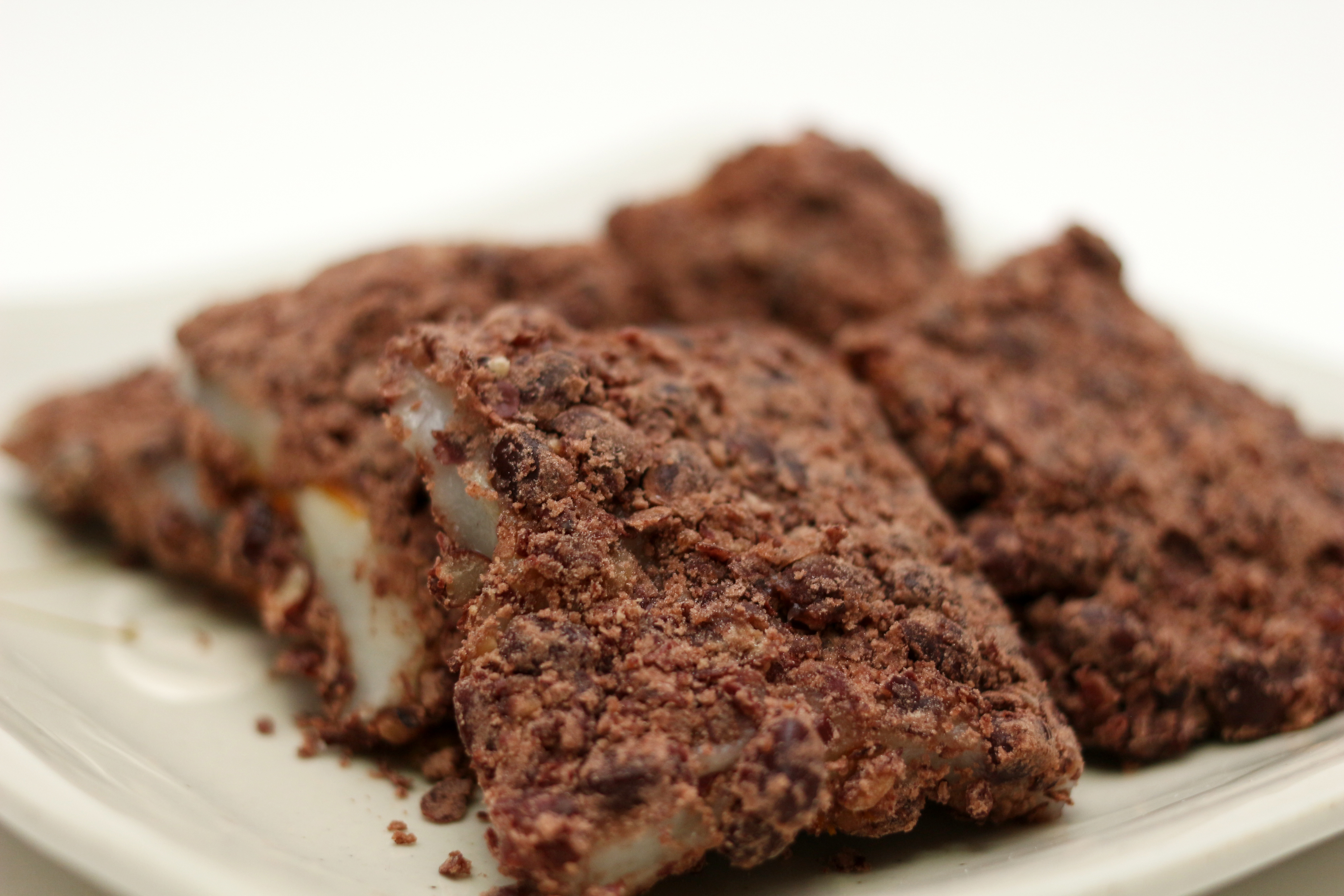
Siru-tteok filled with pat-gomul (red bean powder)

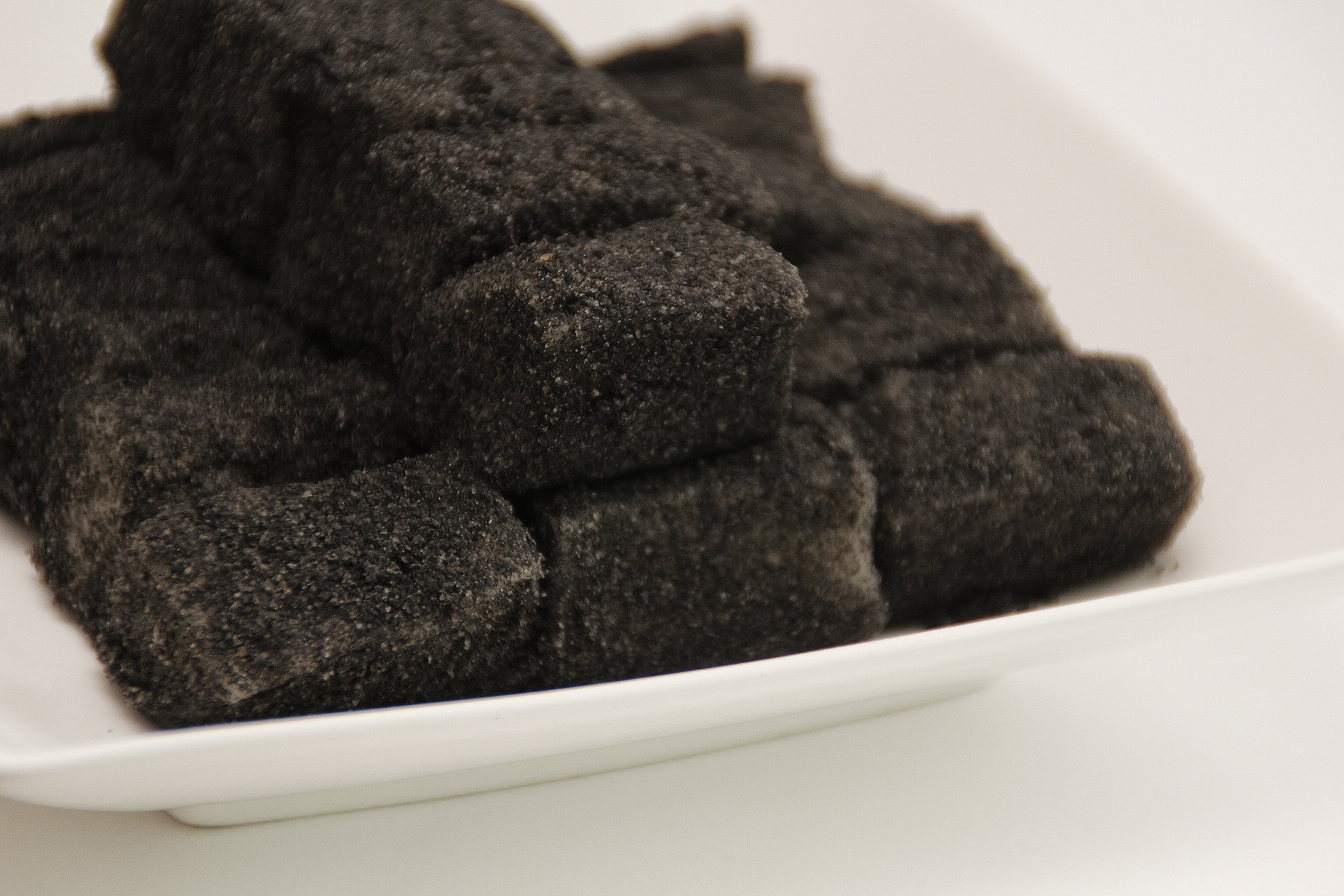
Injeolmi coated with heugimja-gomul (black sesame powder)

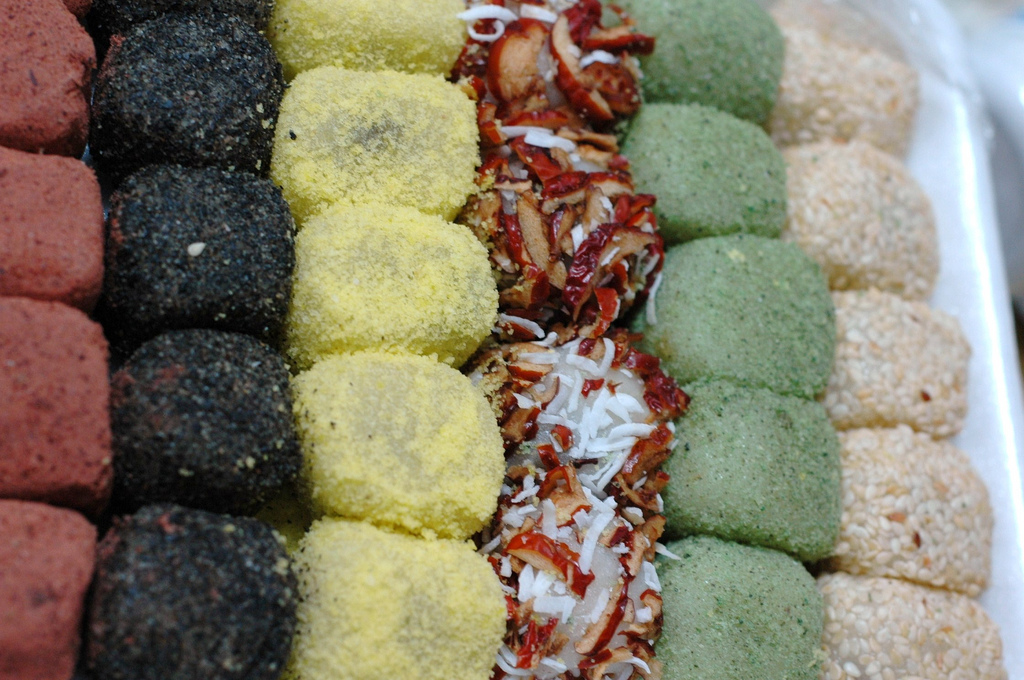
Gyeongdan coated with various gomul

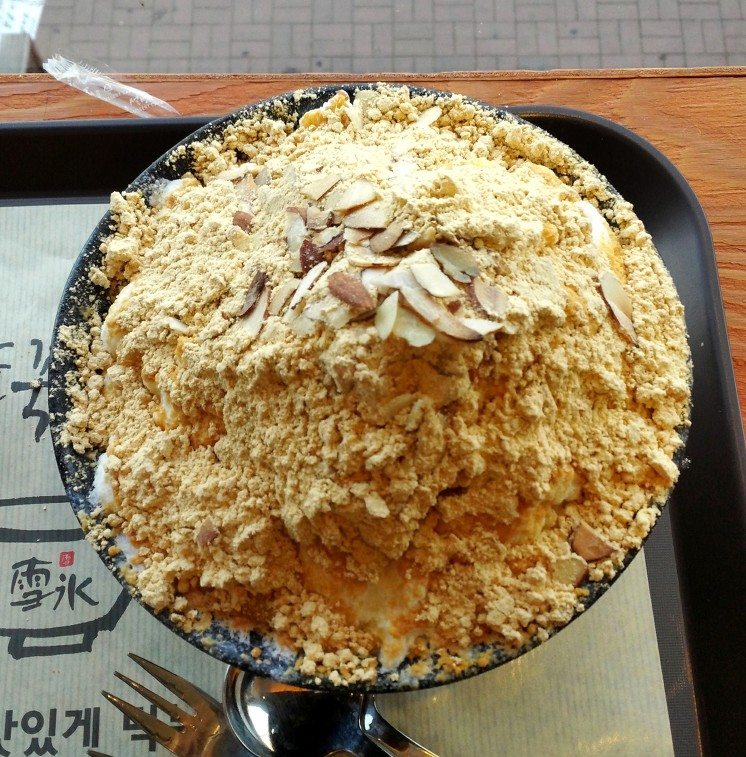
Bingsu topped with kong-gomul (soybean powder)

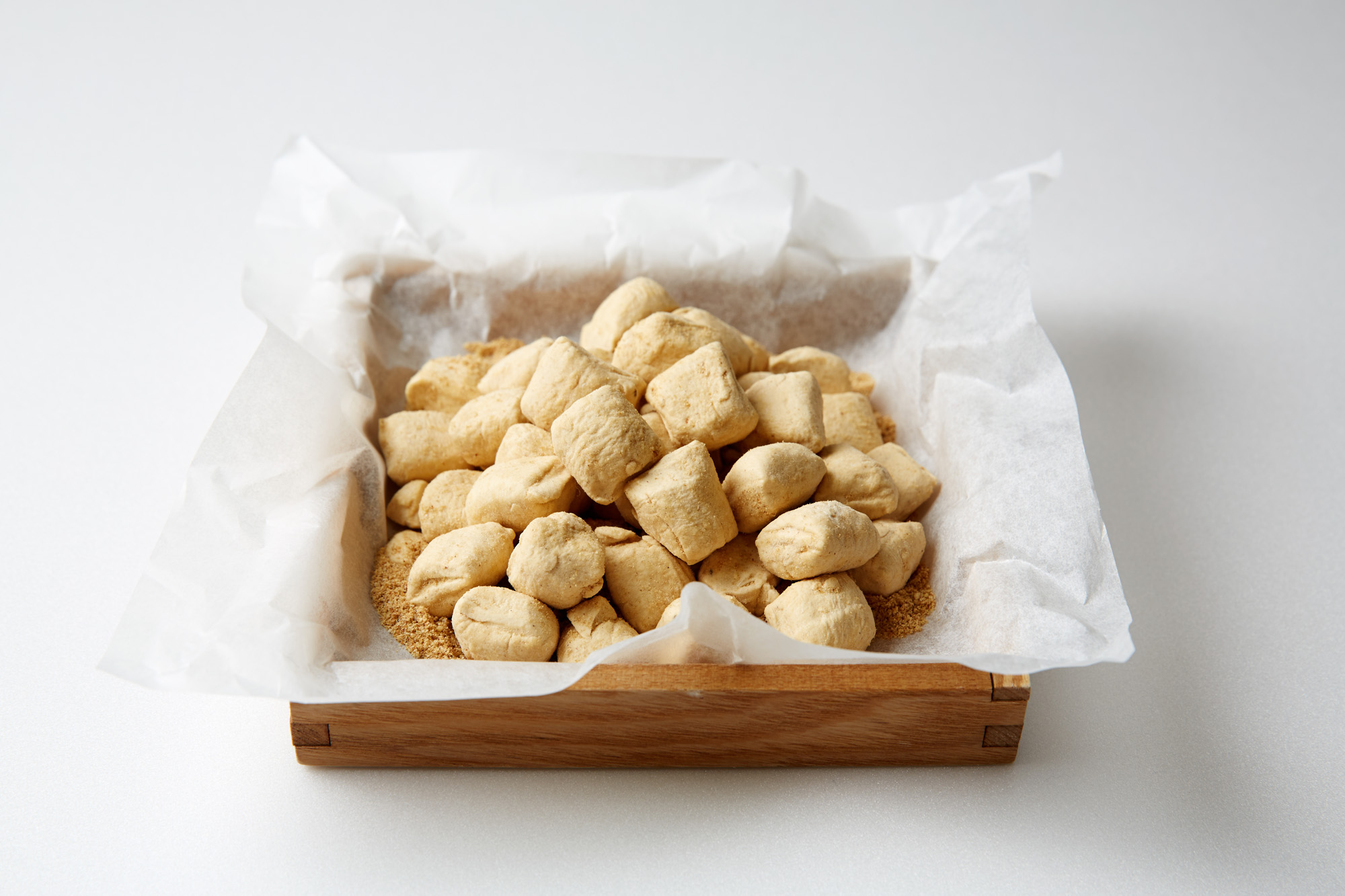
Yeot coated with kong-gomul (soybean powder)
