= Bingsu =

Korean shaved ice dessert with sweet toppings

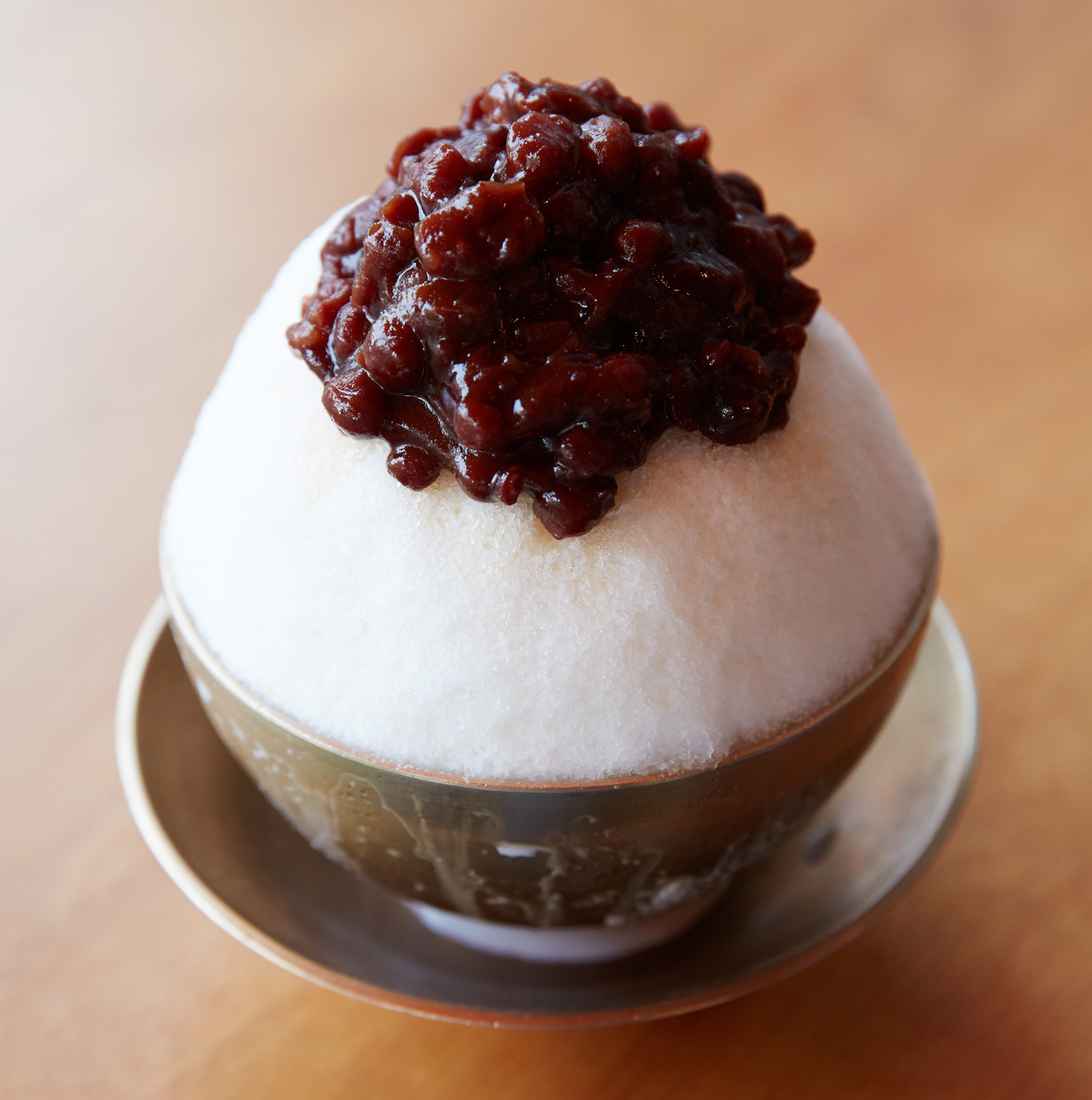
- The basic form of Pat-bingsu (red bean bingsu)
- Alternative names: Bingsoo
- Type: Shaved ice
- Course: Dessert
- Place of origin: Korea
- Serving temperature: Cold
- Main ingredients: Ice, toppings
- Variations: Pat-bingsu (red bean bingsu), nokcha-bingsu (green tea bingsu), ttalgi-bingsu (strawberry bingsu), choko-bingsu (chocolate bingsu), etc

Korean name
- Hangul: 빙수
- Hanja: 氷水
- RR: bingsu
- MR: pingsu
- IPA: piŋ.su

Red bean shaved ice
- Hangul: 팥빙수
- Hanja: 팥氷水
- RR: patbingsu
- MR: p'atpingsu
- IPA: pʰat̚.p͈iŋ.su

Bingsu (Korean: 빙수; lit. 'ice water'), sometimes written as bingsoo, is a milk-based Korean shaved ice dessert with sweet toppings that may include chopped fruit, condensed milk, fruit syrup, tteok, and red beans.

The most common variety is patbingsu (Korean: 팥빙수, lit. 'red bean frozen water'), topped with sweet red beans. The main ingredient of bingsu was natural ice in the past, but later, artificial ice was produced, and high-quality sweeteners were developed. Many modern bingsu varieties use frozen milk rather than water-based ice. Historically, the ice-cutting machine was a simple tool in the shape of a plane, but now, most shaved ice is created by electric ice shavers.

== History ==
Bingsu has similar origins to sorbet, with fruit- and milk-flavored ice-based confectionary documented as far back as 400 BCE. The earliest known documentation of ice-based desserts within Korea existed during the Joseon period (1392–1897) which employed the use of crushed ice with various fruits, and were distributed from the ancient Korean ice storage called Gyeongju Seokbinggo (Korean: 석빙고).

After the Korean War, with the introduction of condensed milk, syrup, and chocolate from the United States, together with the mass migration of Korean immigrants who brought their culinary cuisine to the US, Korean bingsu began to be more diverse. Western ingredients brought into the country after the Korean War, along with the influence of Korean American immigrants have brought further variation to the ingredients used in the dish, with foods such as cereal, ice cream, and whipped cream being added to bingsu.

== Varieties ==
Patbingsu (팥빙수; 팥氷水; sometimes anglicized as patbingsoo, literally "red bean shaved ice") is a popular Korean shaved ice dessert with sweet toppings that may include chopped fruit, condensed milk, fruit syrup, and red beans.

The food began as ice shavings with red beans (known as pat, 팥). Many varieties of patbingsu exist in contemporary culture.

There are a variety of bingsu types and flavors. Some popular flavors are green tea, coffee, and yogurt.

In addition to the existing patbingsu, several Korean franchises have made shaved ice from various ingredients such as Injeolmi, melon, coffee, and green tea. Now, bingsu can be found at almost every dessert shop in Korea.

== Gallery ==
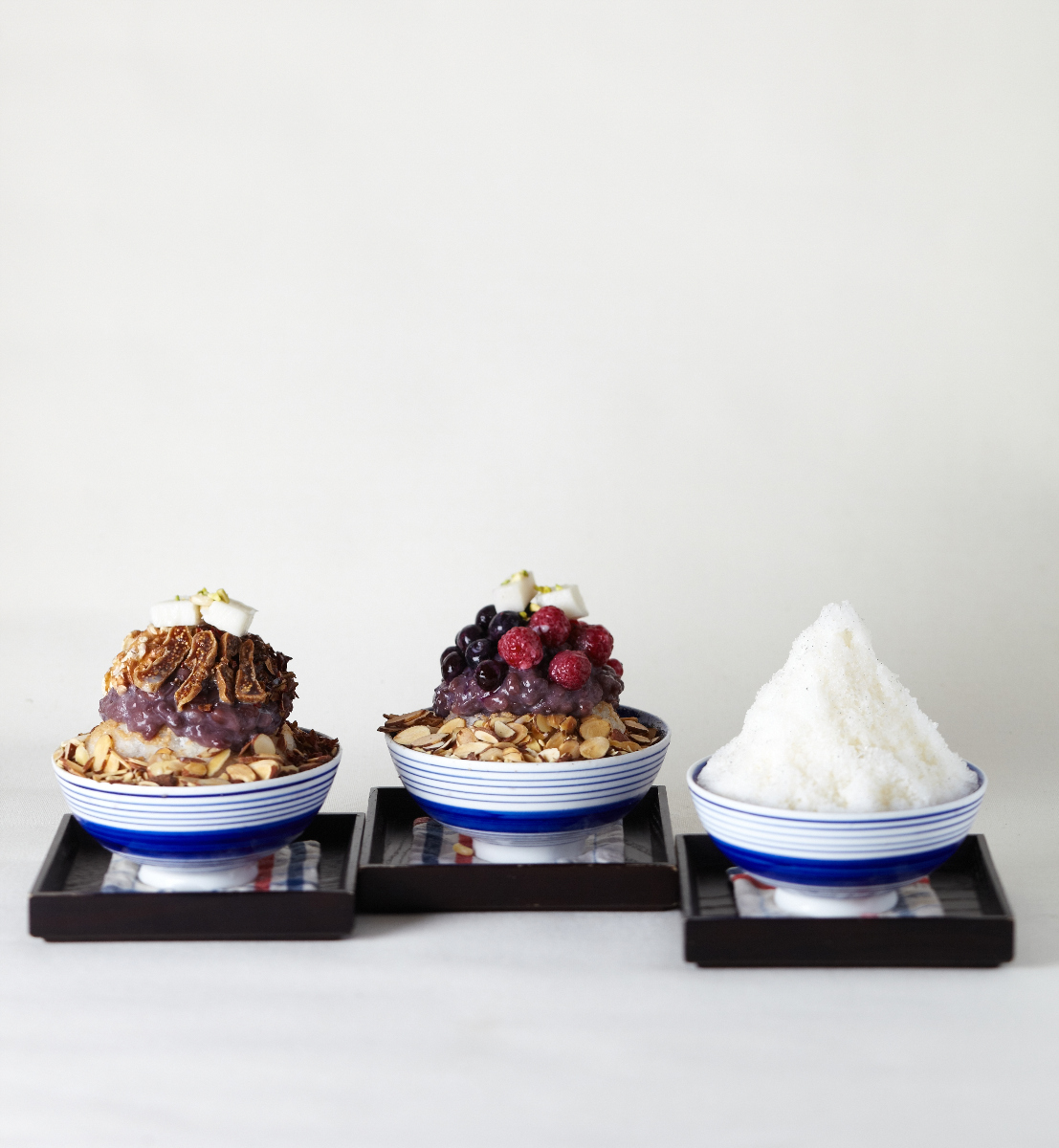
Various bingsu

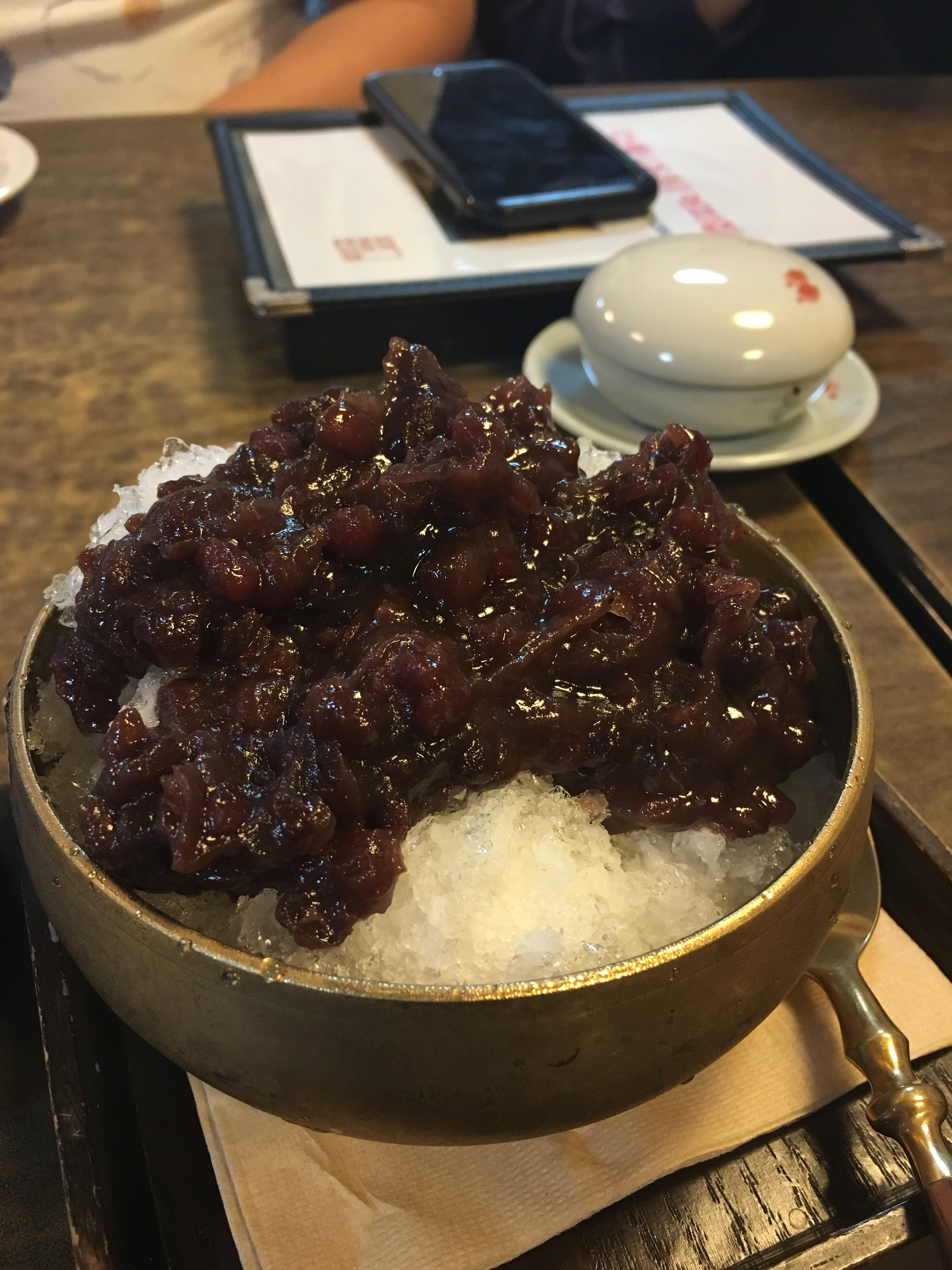
Patbingsu

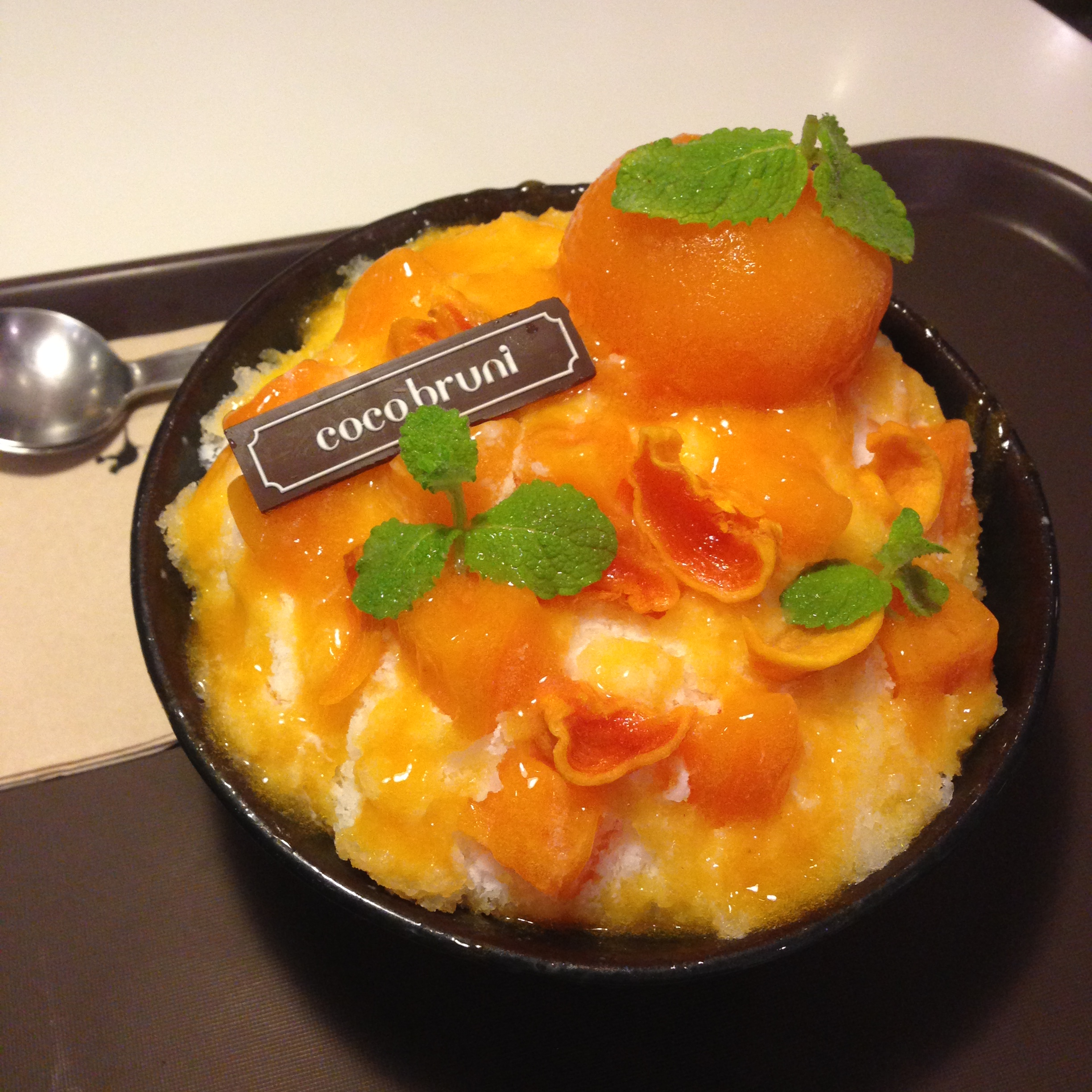
Persimmon bingsu

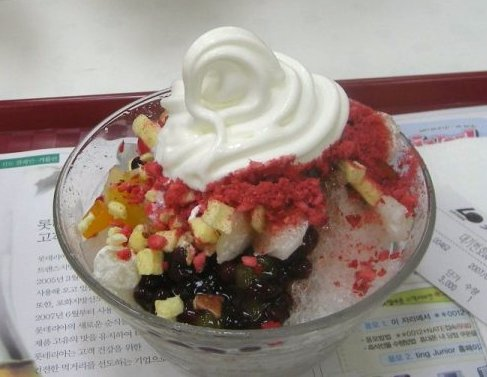
Bingsu with ice cream

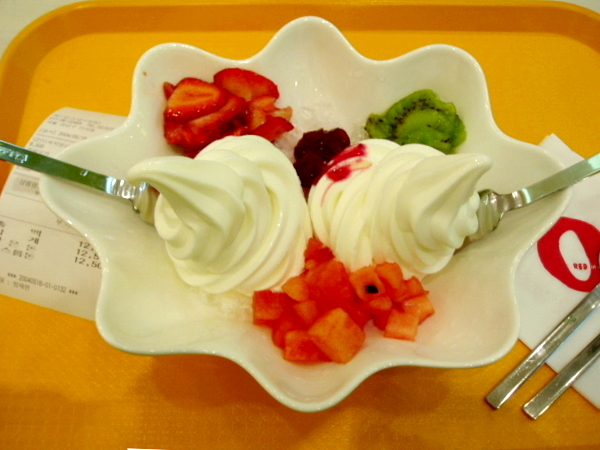
A yogurt bingsu

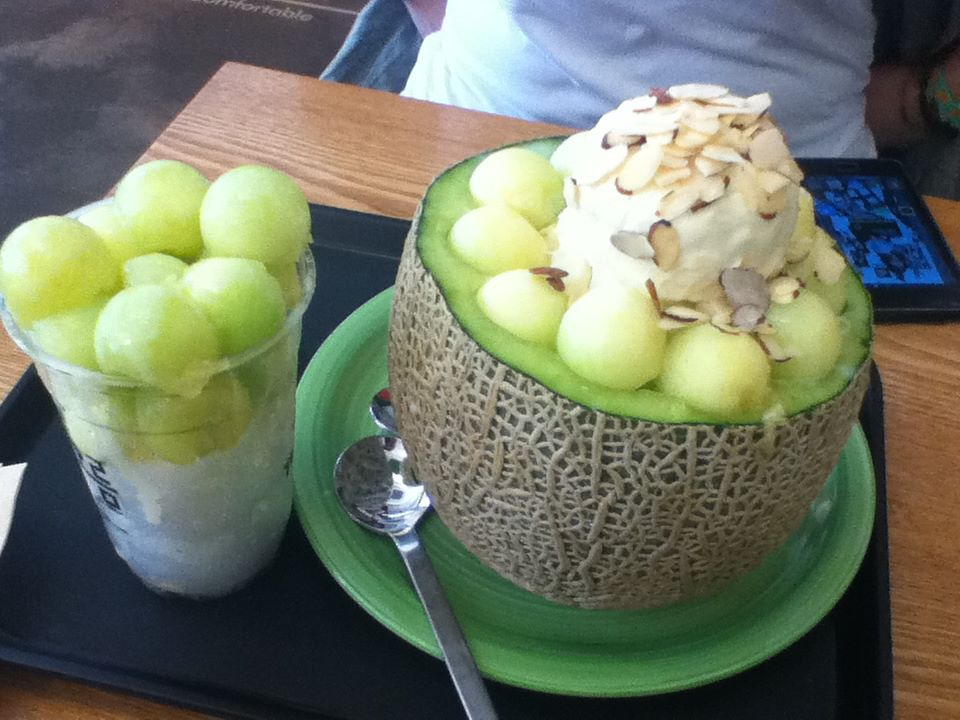
Melon bingsu

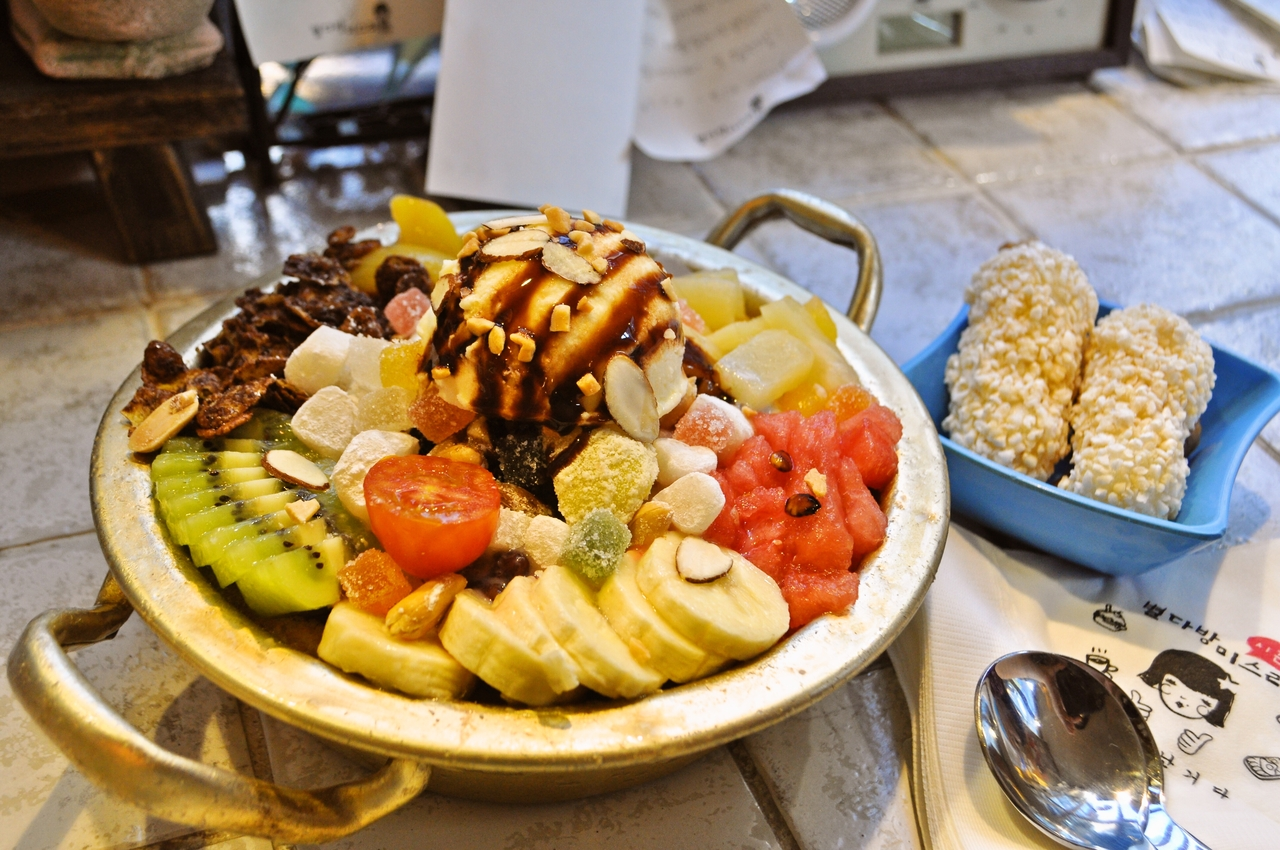
Patbingsu topped with fruits

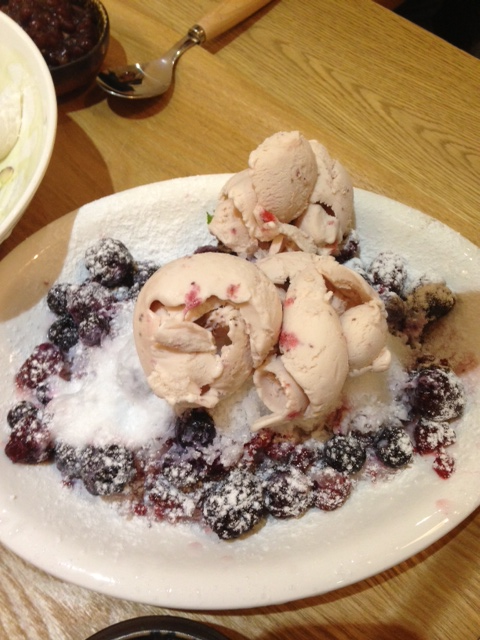
Berry bingsu

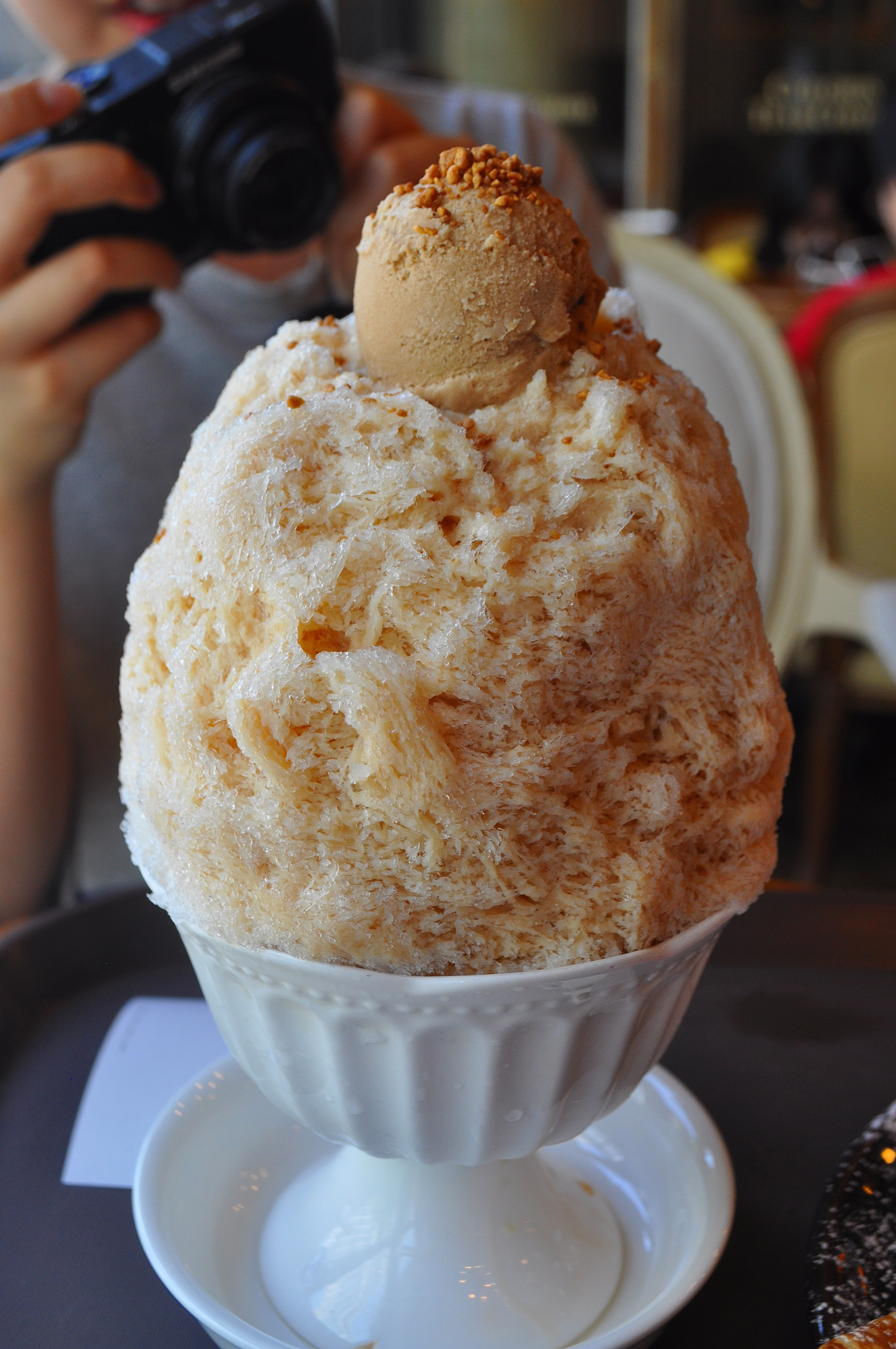
Milk tea bingsu

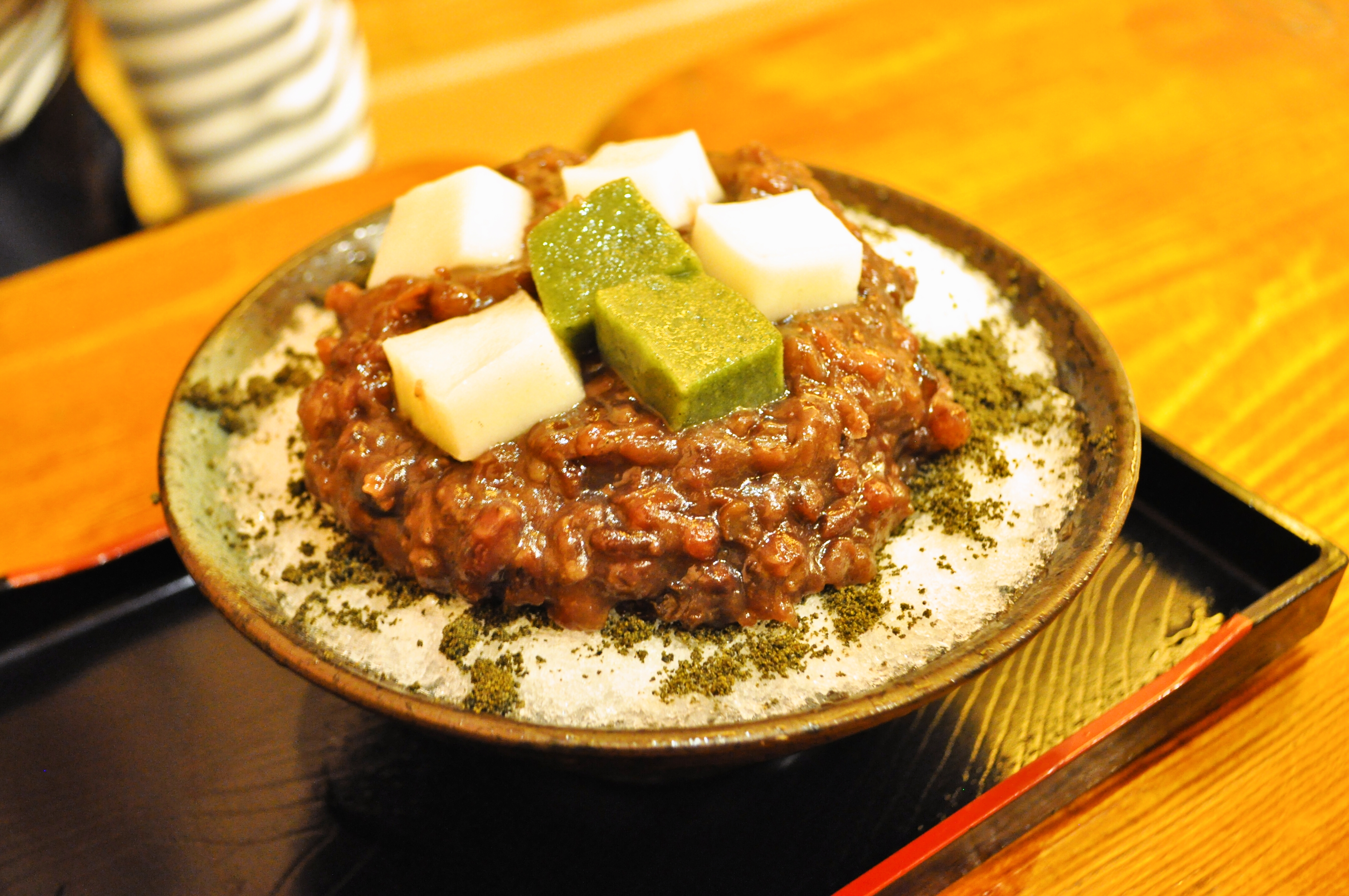
Black sesame bingsu

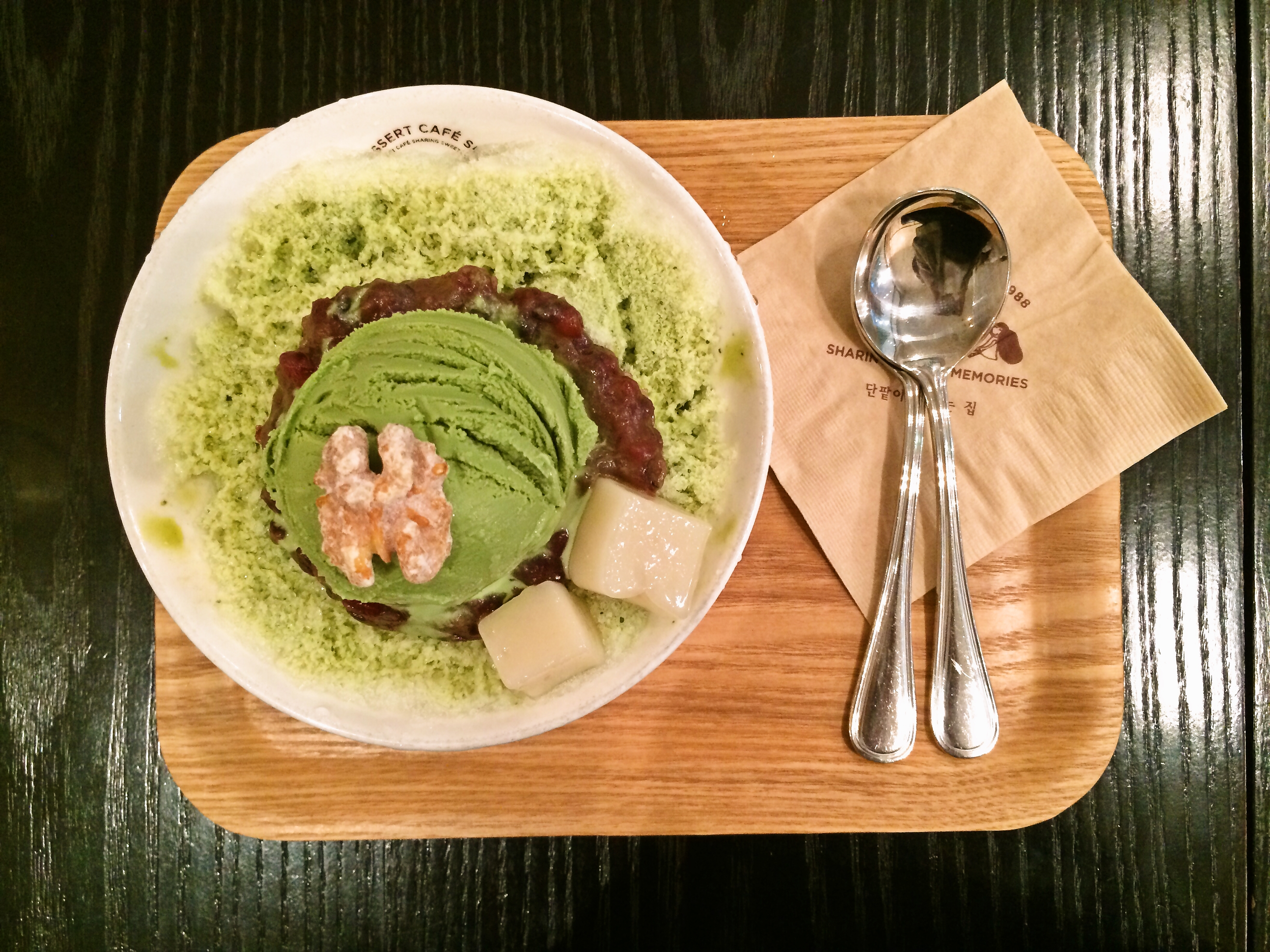
Green tea bingsu

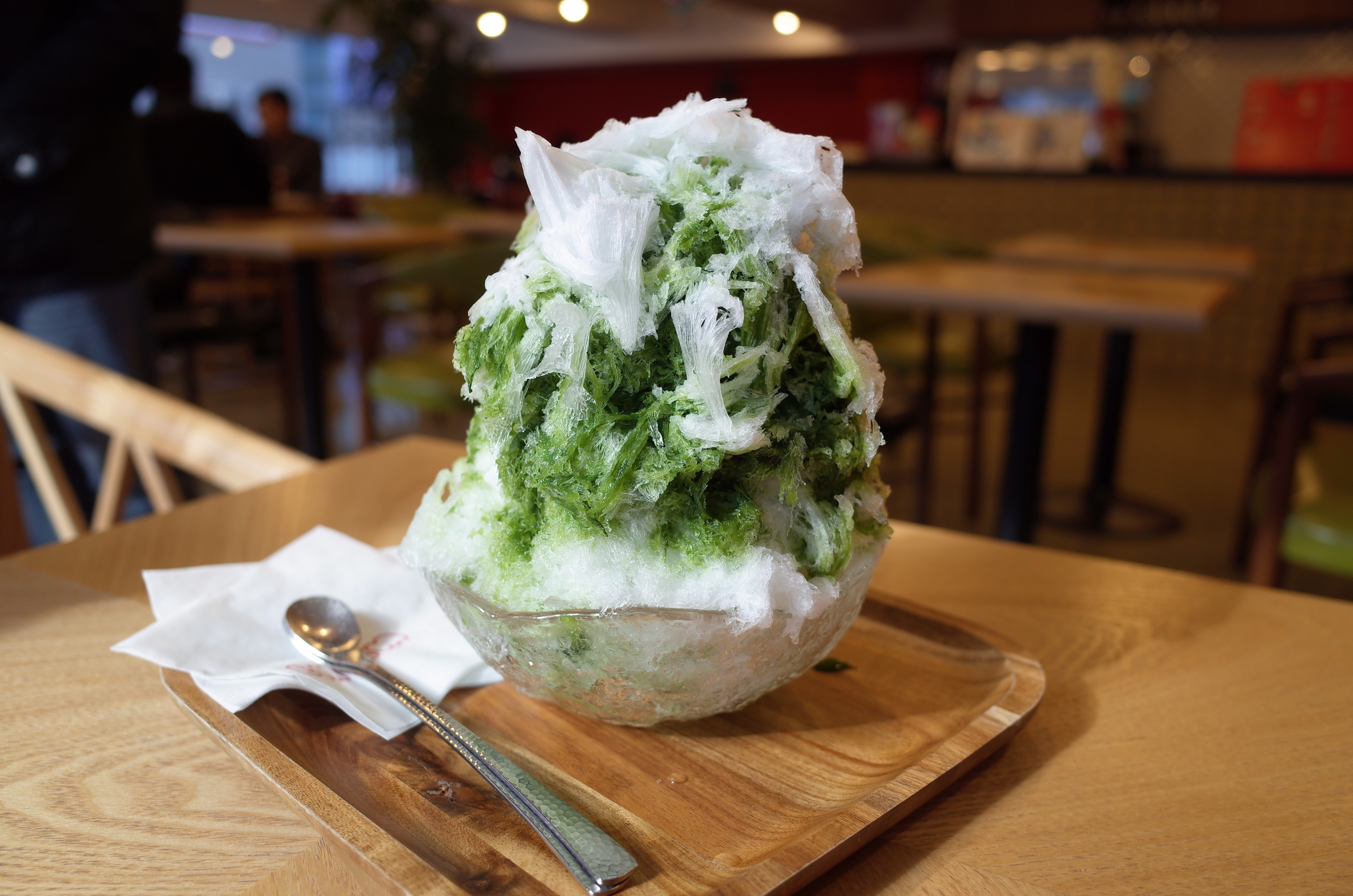
Green tea bingsu

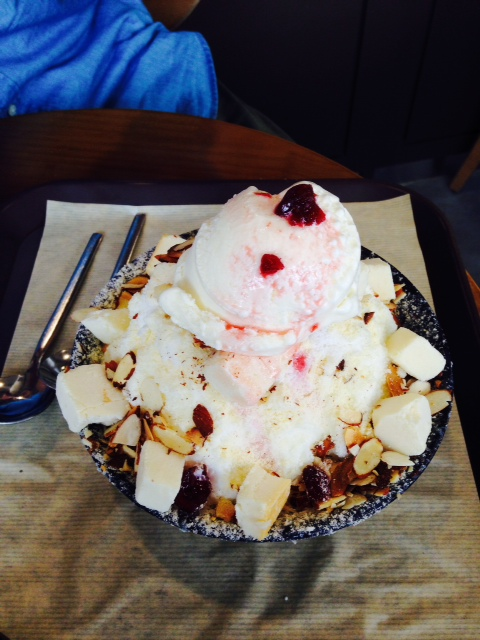
Cheese bingsu

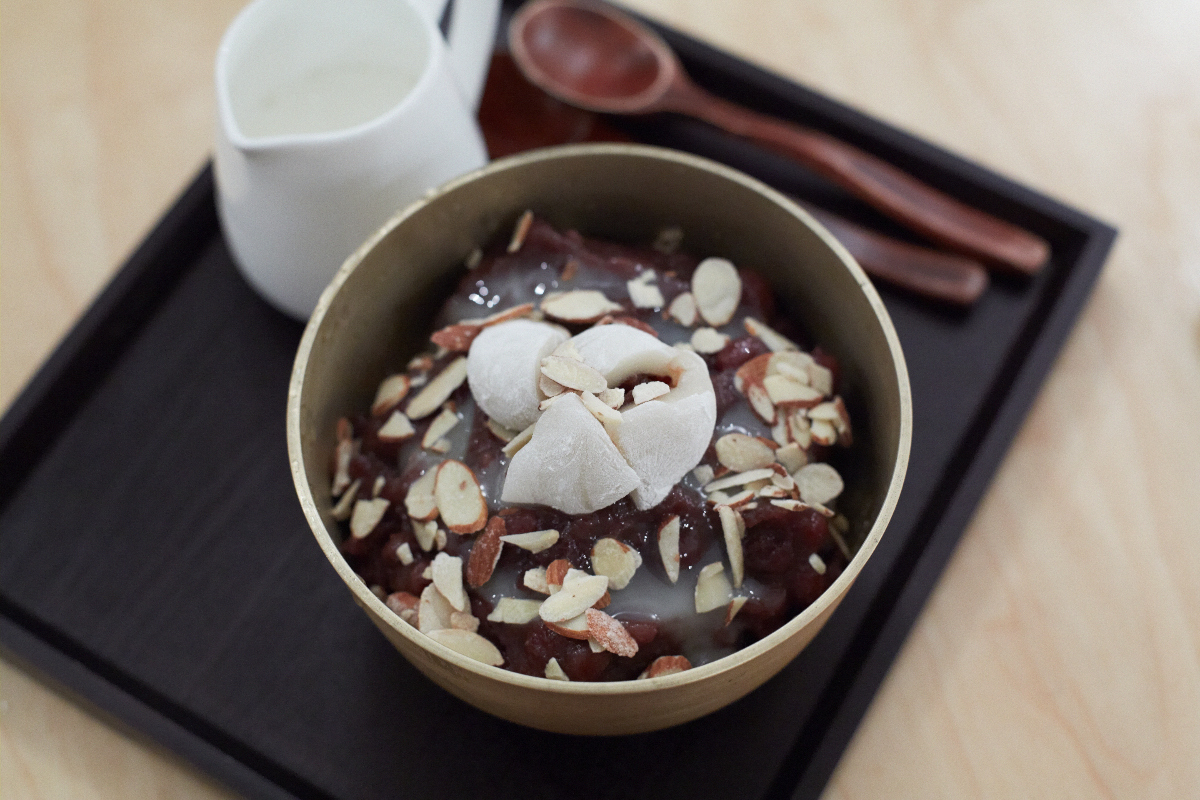
Patbingsu

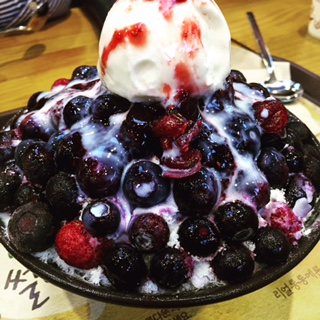
Mixed-berry bingsu

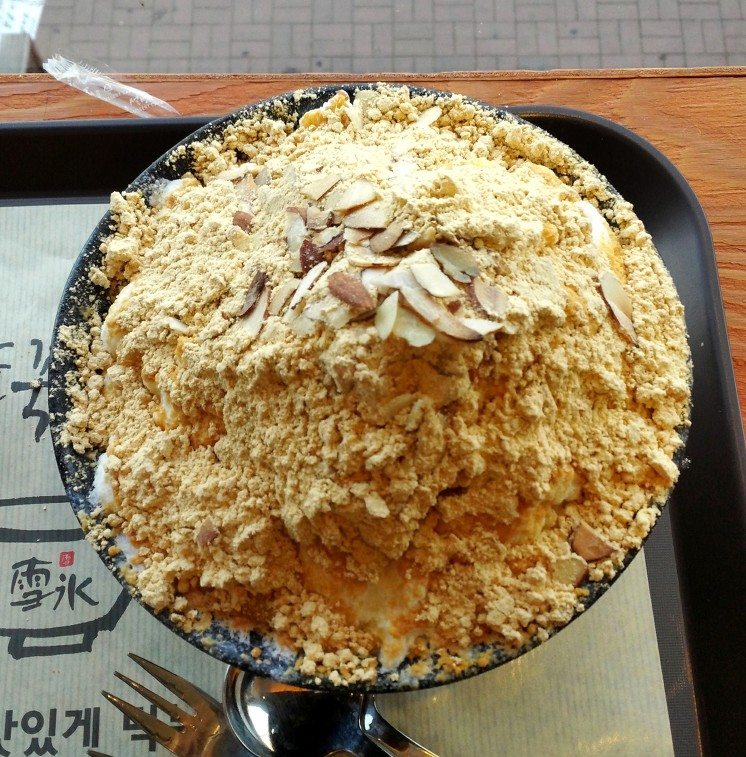
Injeolmi-bingsu topped with kong-gomul (soybean powder)

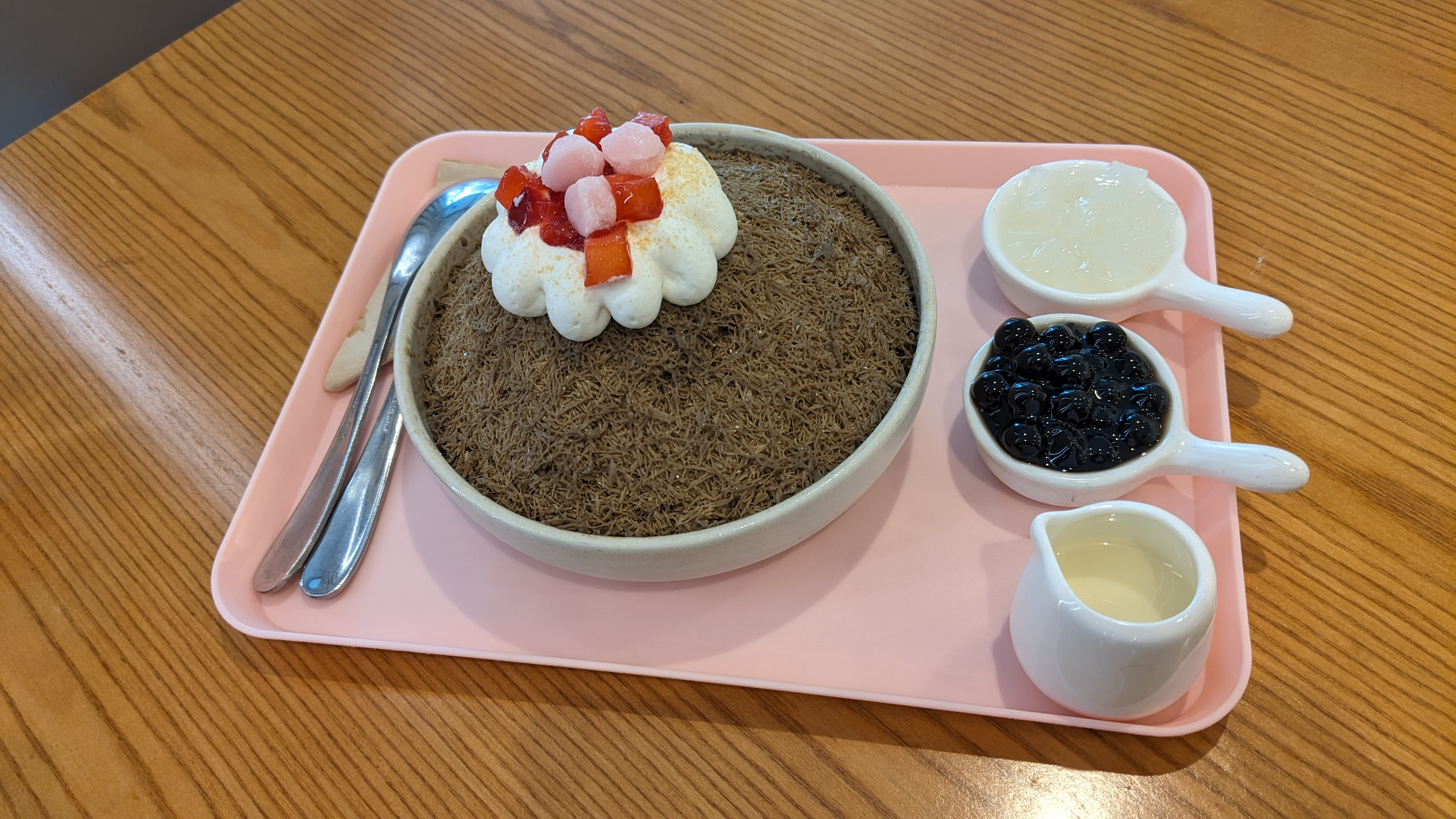
Hojicha bingsu served with tapioca pearls, condensed milk and coconut.

== See also ==
- Korean cuisine
- Shaved ice § Regions, for similar shaved ice variations around the world.
- Kakigōri: Japanese shaved ice
- Tshuah-ping: Taiwanese shaved ice
- Halo-halo: Filipino shaved ice
- Es campur and Es teler: Indonesian shaved ice
- Namkhaeng sai and O-aew: Thai shaved ice
- Ais Kacang (ABC, Ice Kacang): Malaysian/Singaporean shaved ice
- Grattachecca: Italian shaved ice popular in Rome.
- Hawaiian shave ice: Hawaiian shaved ice
