= Danja (food) =

Korean rice cake variety

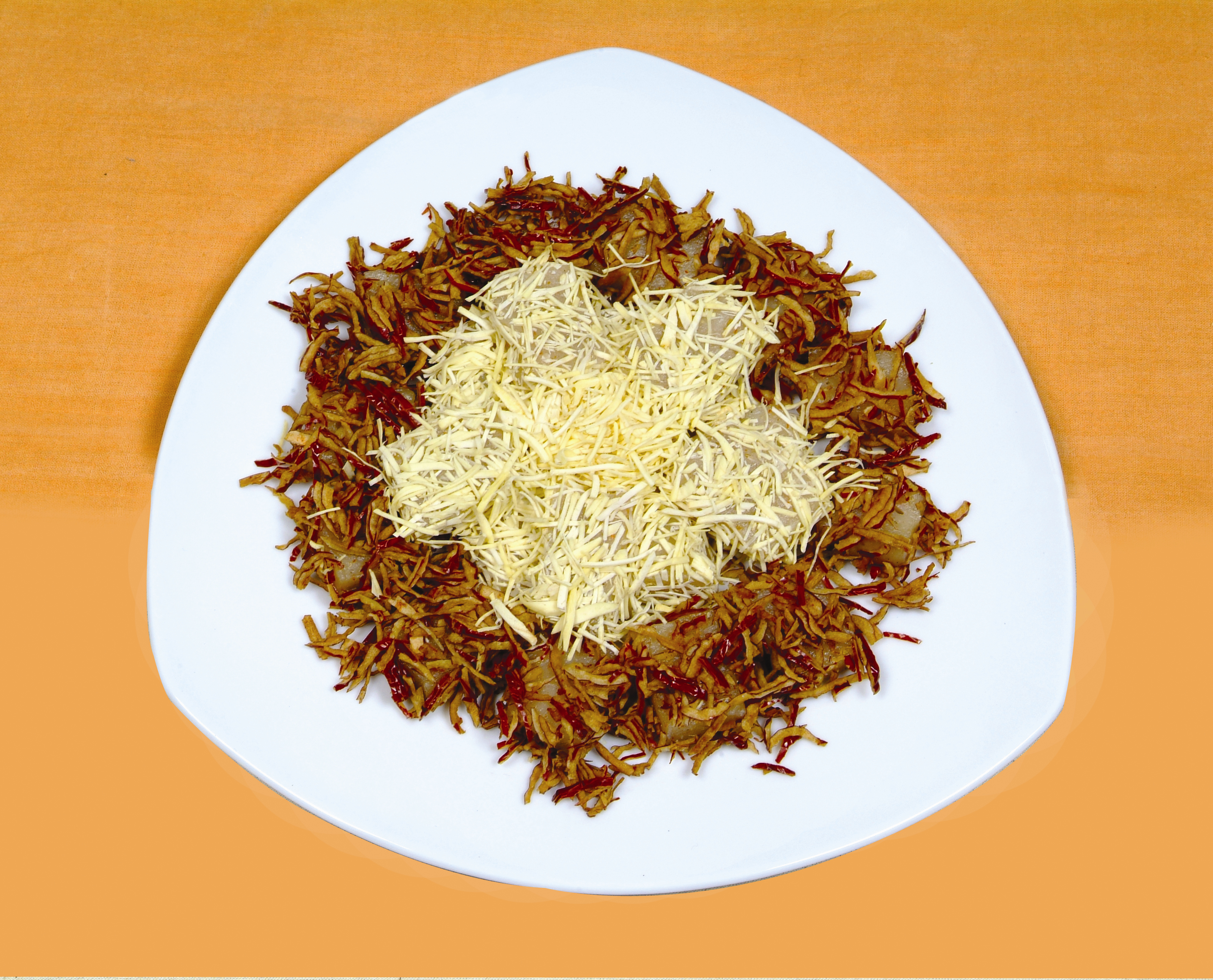
- Bam-danja (chestnut danja) and daechu-danja (jujube danja)
- Type: Tteok
- Place of origin: Korea
- Associated cuisine: Korean cuisine

Korean name
- Hangul: 단자
- Hanja: 團餈
- RR: danja
- MR: tanja
- IPA: tan.dʑa

Danja (Korean: 단자; Hanja: 團餈) is a variety of steamed tteok (rice cake) made with glutinous rice flour, sweet fillings, and sweet coatings.

== Etymology and related rice cakes ==
Dan (단; 團) means "round", and ja (자; 餈) means injeolmi (steamed and pounded tteok).Danja differs from injeolmi in that steamed glutinous rice flour, not steamed rice, is pounded. Danja is also smaller than injeolmi and tends to be globular rather than angulate.

Another similar rice cake, gyeongdan, shares the letter dan (단; 團). Gyeongdan, unlike danja, is usually boiled before it is coated. Typical coatings also differ. Japanese dango, which also shares the letter dan, can be either boiled or steamed, and is not necessarily coated.

== Preparation and varieties ==
Danja is made by steaming glutinous rice flour in a siru (steamer), pounding the steamed tteok, shaping it into chestnut-sized balls with various coatings that are sweetened with honey, and coating the balls with honey followed by powdered or shredded ingredients. Common fillings are finely chopped gyulbyeong (Mandarin orange boiled in honey), cooked and sieved chestnuts mixed with cinnamon powder and honey, and geopipat-so (white, dehulled red bean paste) mixed with cinnamon powder and honey. Common coatings are cooked with sieved chestnuts, shredded jujubes, chopped pine nuts, cinnamon powder, and toasted sesame seeds.

Common varieties include:

- bam-danja (밤단자) is filled with a mixture of steamed and sieved chestnuts and finely chopped gyulbyeong (mandarin orange boiled in honey), and coated with honey followed by steamed and sieved chestnuts.
- daechu-danja (대추단자) is made from glutinous rice flour steamed with shredded jujubes and coated with honey followed by shredded jujubes and shredded chestnuts.
- eunhaeng-danja (은행단자) is made from glutinous rice flour steamed with ginkgo powder, and coated with honey followed by chopped pine nuts.
- geonsi-danja (건시단자) is made by wrapping a mixture of powdered chestnuts, cinnamon powder, and honey with thinly sliced gotgam (dried persimmon) preserved in honey, and coating it with chopped pine nuts.
- pat-danja (팥단자) is filled with red bean paste sweetened with honey, and coated with honey followed by steamed and powdered red beans.
- seogi-danja (석이단자) is made from glutinous rice flour steamed with soaked and minced rock tripe mixed with honey, and coated with honey followed by chopped pine nuts.
- seunggeomcho-danja (승검초단자) is made from glutinous rice flour steamed with angelica powder, filled with red bean paste and coated with honey followed by steamed and powdered red beans.
- ssuk-danja (쑥단자) is made from steamed glutinous rice flour pounded with minced mugwort, filled with honey and chestnuts or yuja-cheong (yuja marmalade) with jujubes, and coated with honey followed by steamed and powdered geopipat (white, dehulled black adzuki beans).
- yuja-danja (유자단자) is made from glutinous rice flour steamed with yuja zest, filled with sieved chestnuts and covered with honey followed by steamed and powdered geopipat (white, dehulled black adzuki beans).

== See also ==
- Dango
- Gyeongdan
