= Injeolmi =

Variety of tteok (Korean rice cake)

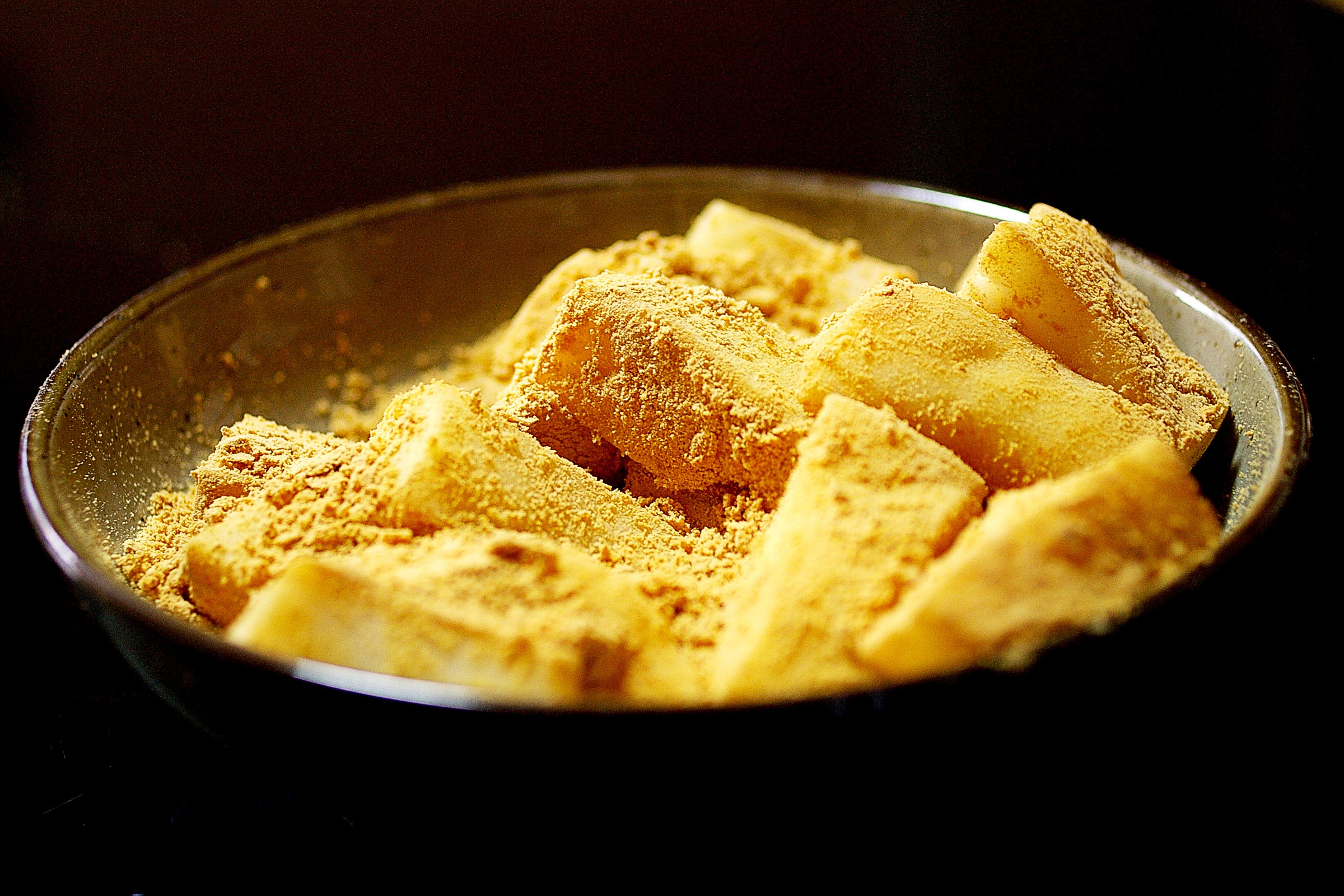
- Injeolmi covered with roasted soybean powder
- Place of origin: Korea
- Region or state: Korean-speaking areas
- Main ingredients: glutinous rice flour, bean powders

Korean name
- Hangul: 인절미
- RR: injeolmi
- MR: injŏlmi

Injeolmi (Korean: 인절미, pronounced [in.dʑʌl.mi]) is a variety of tteok, or Korean rice cake, made by steaming and pounding glutinous rice flour, which is shaped into small pieces and usually covered with steamed powdered dried beans or other ingredients.

It is a representative type of glutinous pounded tteok, and has varieties depending on the type of gomul (고물, something to coat rice cakes) used. Gomul can be made with powdered dried soybeans, azuki beans, sesame seeds, or sliced dried jujube. Subsidiary ingredients are mixed into the steamed rice while pounding it on the anban (안반, wooden pounding board). Patinjeolmi (팥인절미) and kkaeinjeolmi (깨인절미) are two examples, coated with azuki bean powder and sesame respectively. Artemisia is added in ssuk injeolmi (쑥인절미) and Synurus deltoides (Ait.) Nakai is added in surichwi injeolmi (수리취인절미).

Injeolmi is not only a popular snack but also is considered a high quality tteok, used for janchi (잔치; party, feast, or banquet) in Korea. It is easily digested and nutritious. Injeolmi can be stored in a refrigerator and taken out when needed. If the tteok is heated slightly in the microwave, it may taste almost as good as the newly made one. Office workers sometimes eat injeolmi instead of rice or bread because they have no appetite in the morning and injeolmi are easily digested when pressed for time.

It is better to use soybean gomul in summer because it less prone to spoil. Red bean gomul (팥고물) is used a lot in spring, fall, and winter.

The technique used in making injeolmi has an important effect on the product's characteristics, including whether the glutinous rice is Japonica or Japonica/Indica and whether it is steamed in rice grain or in rice powder. The characteristics of injeolmi have been investigated through sensory evaluation and an Instron Universal testing machine.

Various foods using injeolmi are being released. A chef at Shilla Hotel's Chinese restaurant recently introduced 'Injeolmi Tenderloin Guobaorou'. In addition, the cafe released beverages and desserts using injeolmi, such as injeolmi patbingsu-adzuki-bean ice dessert and injeolmi croffle.

== Gallery ==
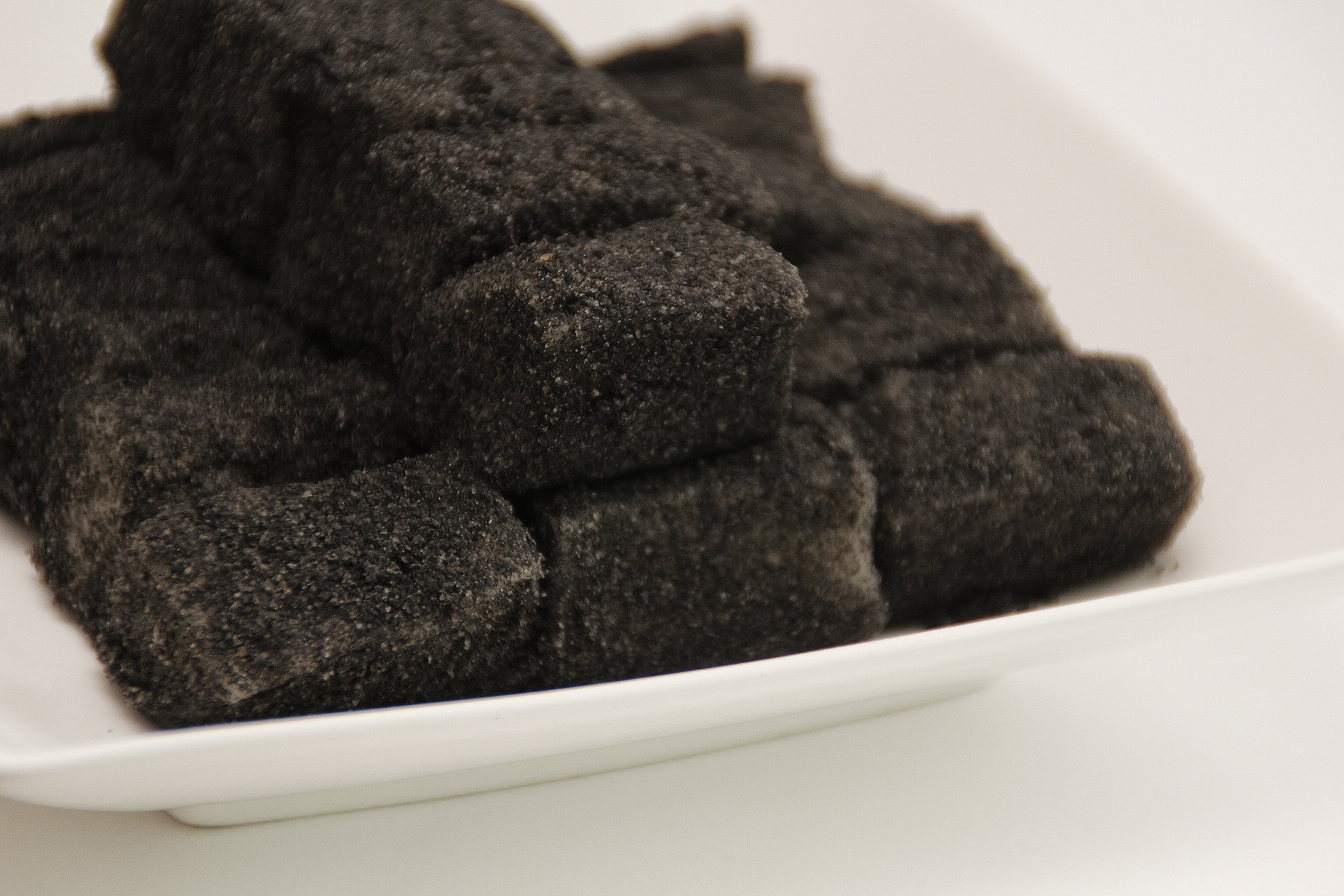
Black sesame injeolmi

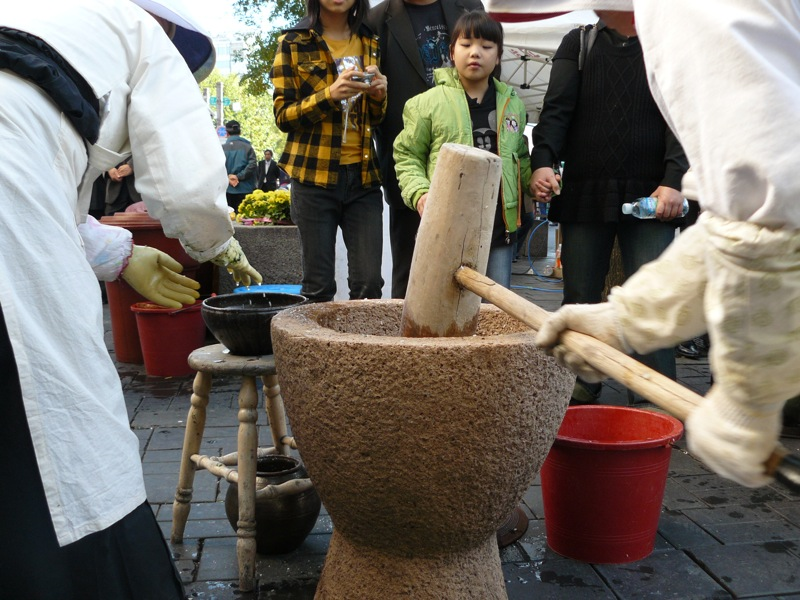
Pounding tteok

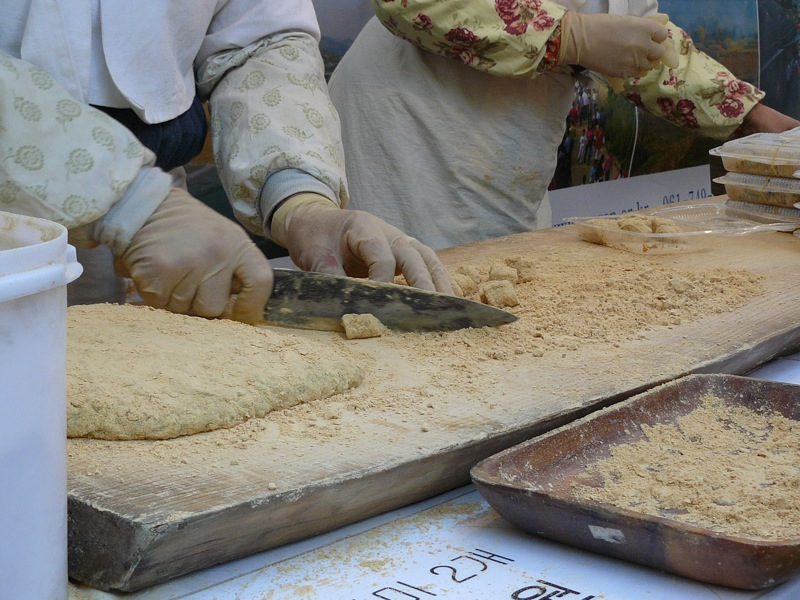
A lump of injeolmi diced into small balls

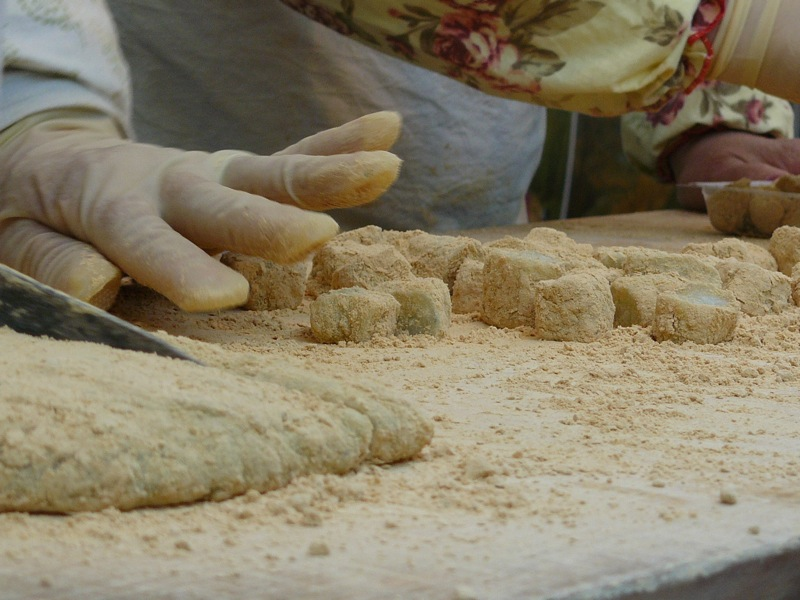

== See also ==
- Tteok
- Mochi
- Rice cake
- List of steamed foods
