= Gyeongju Seokbinggo =

Ice house in Gyeongju, South Korea

Coordinates: 35.8332°N 129.2240°E

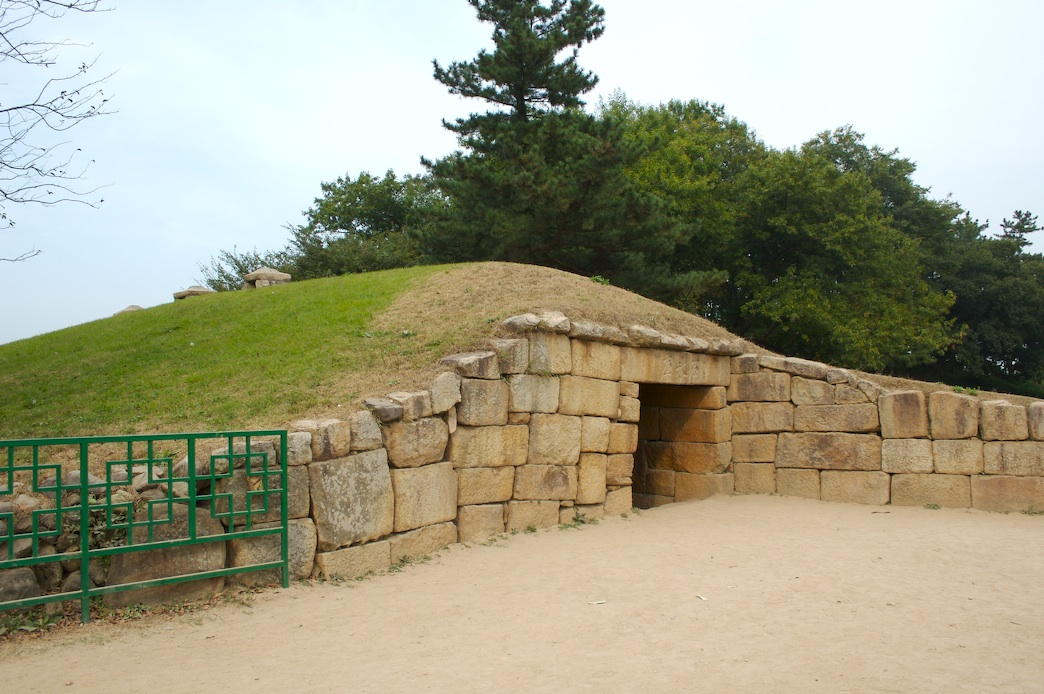
- The entrance of Gyeongju Seokbinggo

Korean name
- Hangul: 경주 석빙고
- Hanja: 慶州石氷庫
- RR: Gyeongju seokbinggo
- MR: Kyŏngju sŏkpinggo

Gyeongju Seokbinggo (Korean: 경주 석빙고; Hanja: 慶州石氷庫) is an ancient ice house located in Inwang-dong, Gyeongju, South Korea. It literally means "stone ice storage" in Korean.

It is located in Gyeongju, the ancient capital of the Silla Era (BC57-AD935). From historical annals, it is assumed that Seokbinggo was made at least 1,500 years ago. Seokbbingo has been designated as National Treasure No. 66. Gyeongju Seokbinggo was made of wood in the Wolseong Fortress by the buyun (부윤, county magistrate) Jo Myeong-gyeom (조명겸) in 1738, the 14th year of King Yeongjo's reign during the Joseon Dynasty. It was moved to the current place four years later, which can be verified by the keystone scripts on the entrance and the monument standing next to the storage. The old seokbinggo site still remains about 100m west from the current one.

The Gyeongju Seokbinggo has been designated as the 66th Treasure of South Korea in 1963 and is managed by the Department of Culture and Tourism of Gyeongju.

== Gallery ==
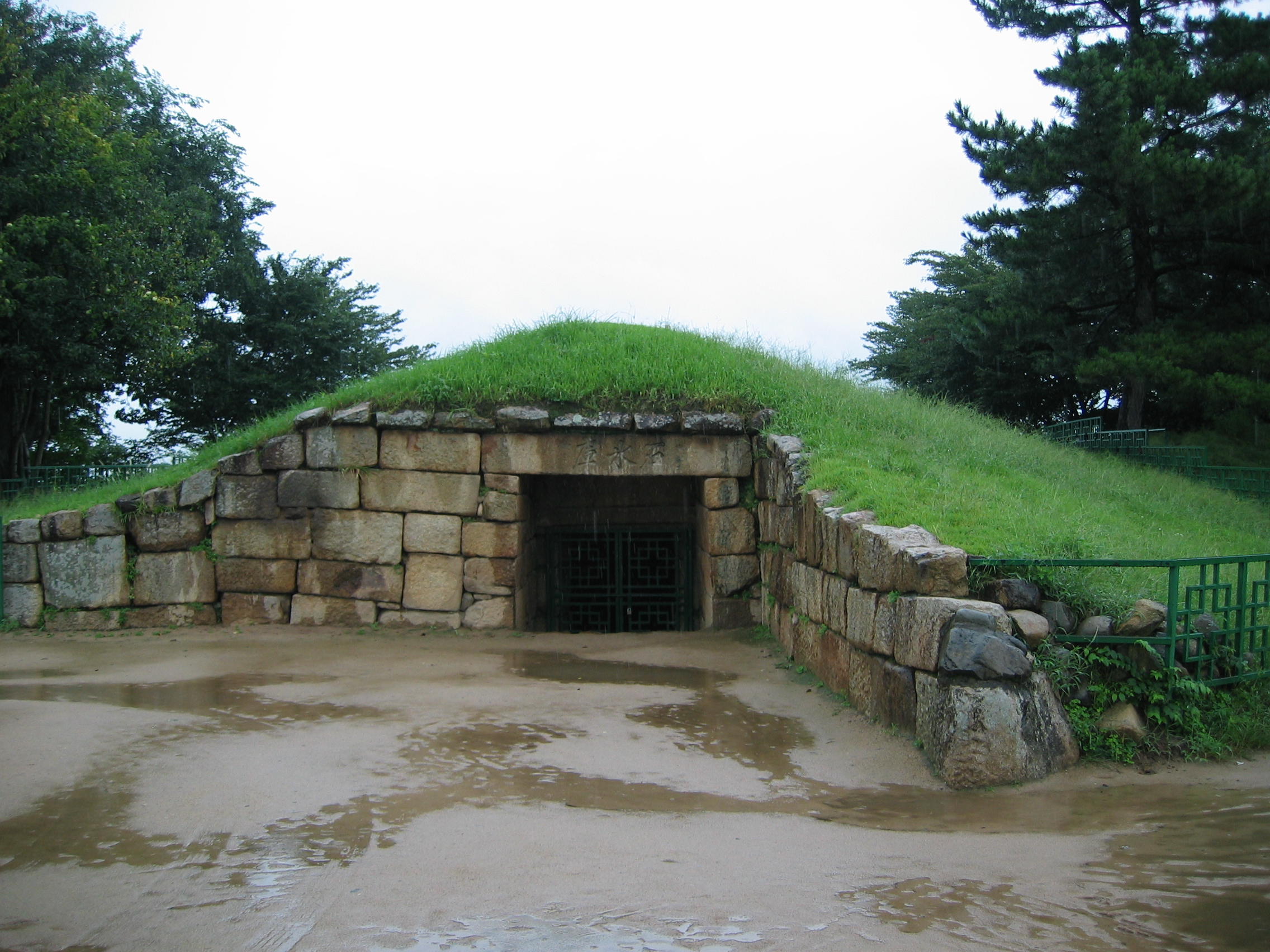

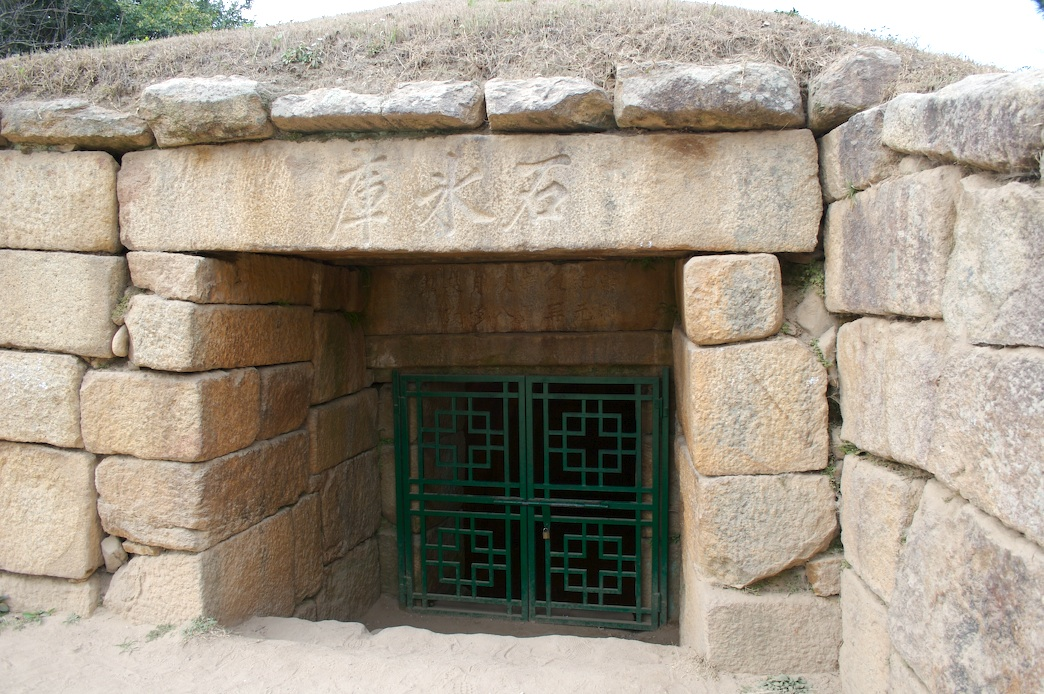

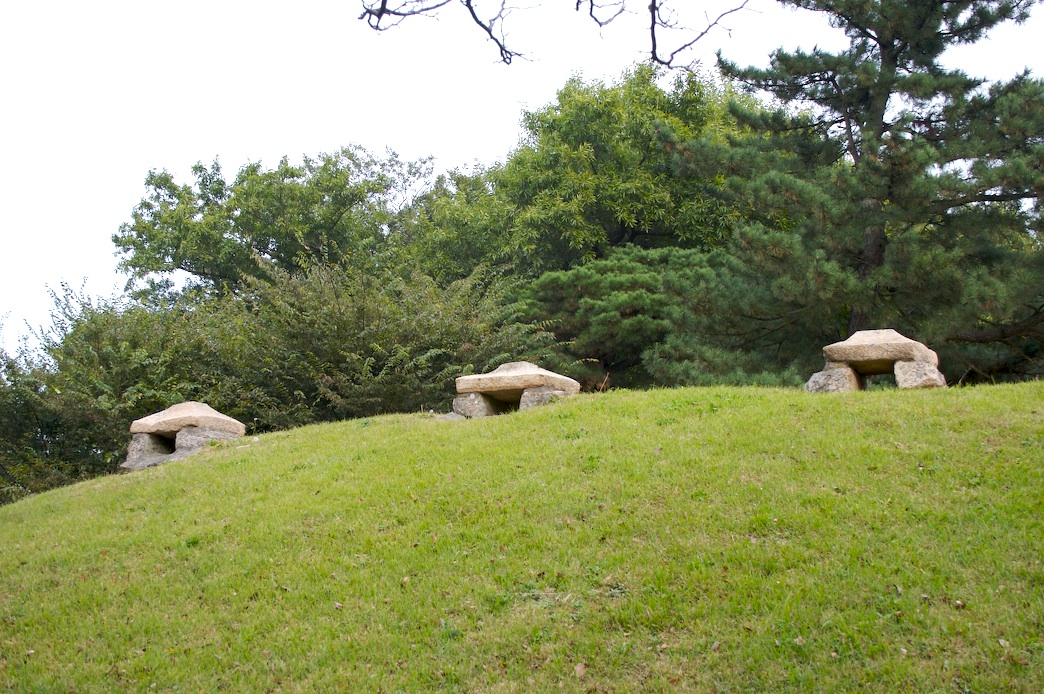

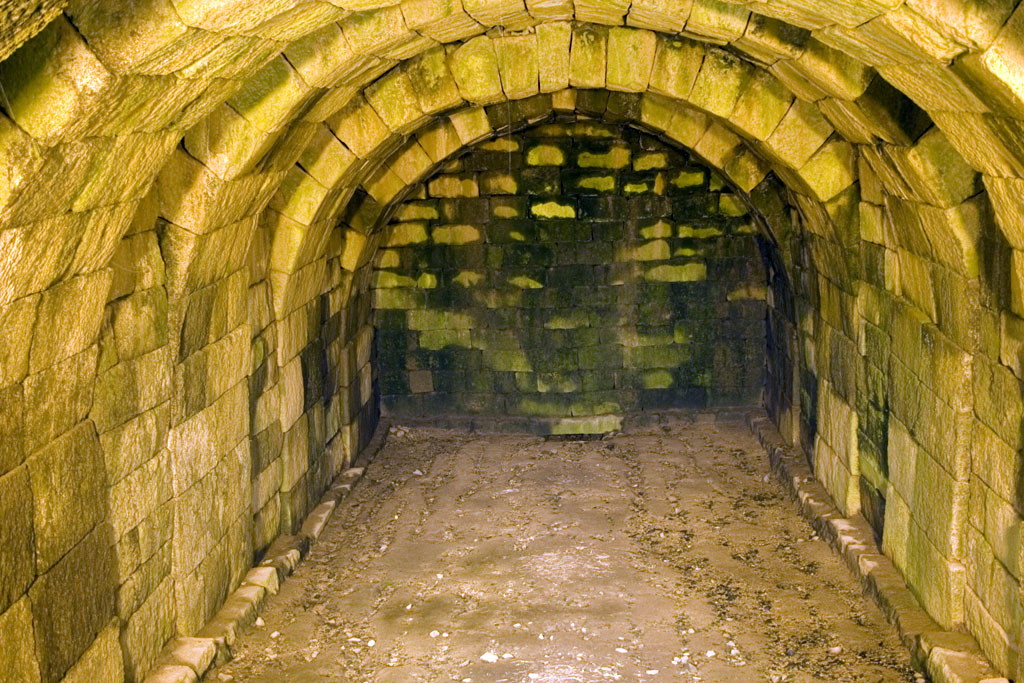

== See also ==
- Tourism in Gyeongju
- Architecture of Korea
- Yakhchal, an ancient Persian refrigerator
