= Gyeongdan =

Boiled rice cake balls

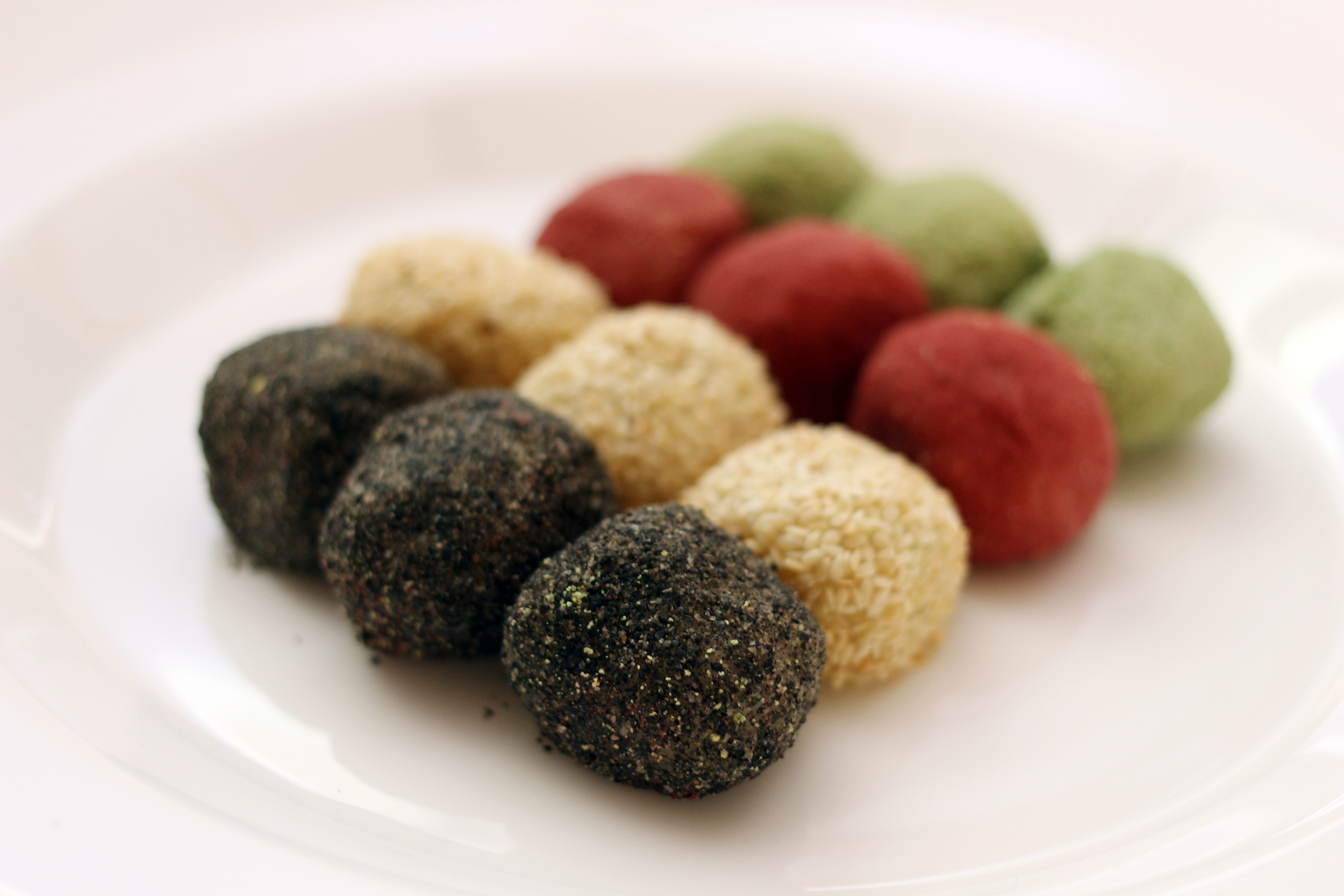
- Place of origin: Korea
- Main ingredients: Rice flour

Korean name
- Hangul: 경단
- Hanja: 瓊團
- RR: gyeongdan
- MR: kyŏngdan
- IPA: [kjʌŋ.dan]

Gyeongdan (Korean: 경단) or Korean rice ball cake is a type of tteok (rice cake) made of glutinous rice or other glutinous cereal flours. When the cereal other than rice is used, its name is usually specified, making compound nouns such as susugyeongdan (수수경단, "sorghum ball cake"). The name chapssalgyeongdan (찹쌀경단, "glutinous rice ball cake") may also be used, but chapssal can be, and usually is, omitted.

Gyeongdan can be made by kneading glutinous rice flour into chestnut-sized balls, then boiling them in water, and coating them with honey, mashed red beans or mung beans, or toasted and ground sesame seeds, etc.

The gyeongdan have various kinds of gomul (고물; Powdered sesame or beans, used for coating tteok, rice cake, in order to improve its appearance and taste.), making them look pretty, but they are not inflexible even after a long period of time because of gomul. The white bean paste, which is on the table for a child's birthday, is decorated with red bean paste, which means that red beans fight evil spirits.

== Gallery ==
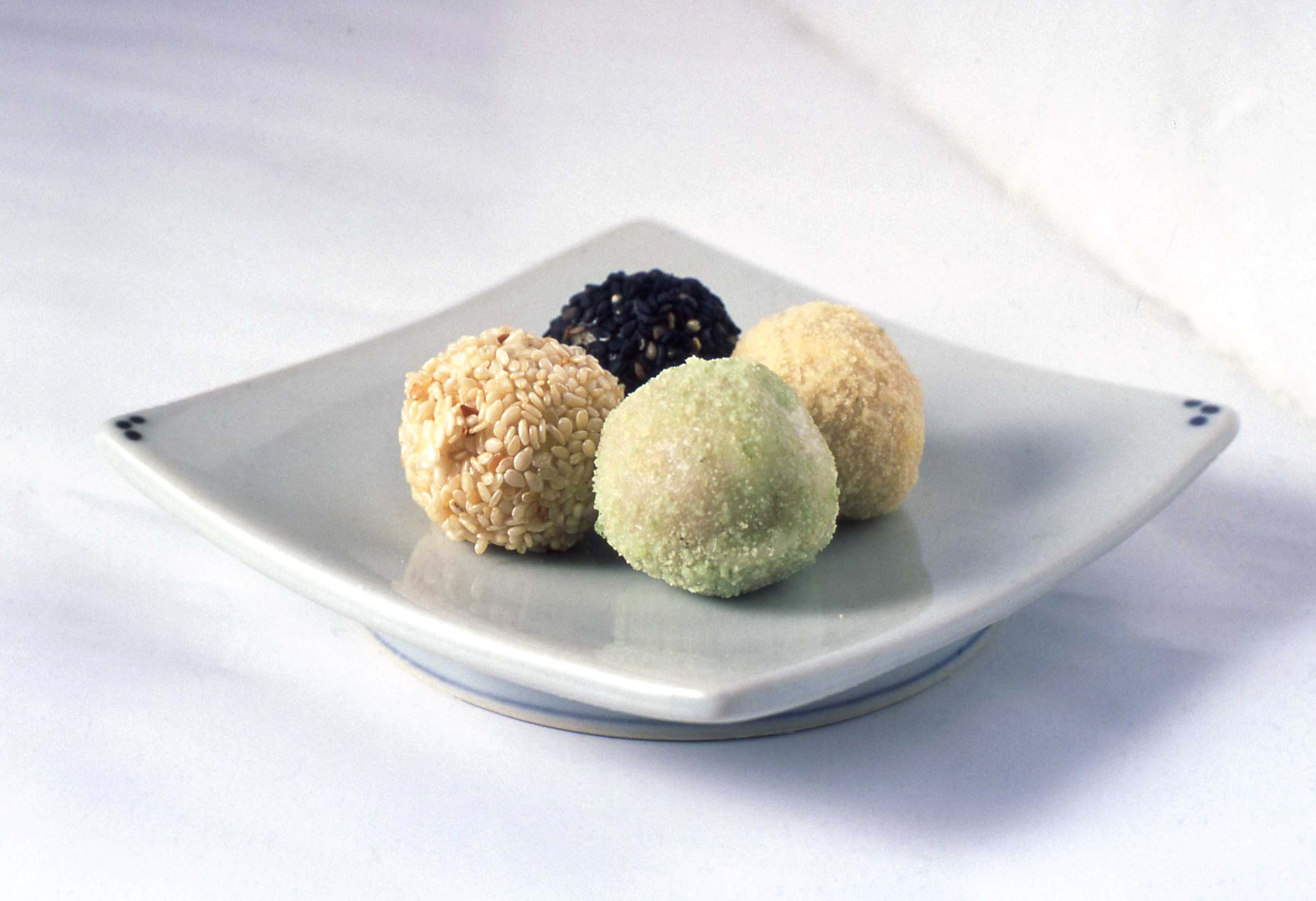

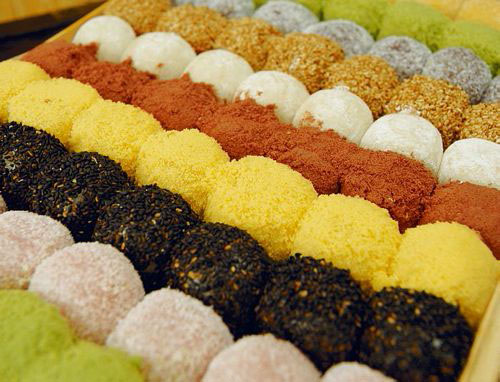

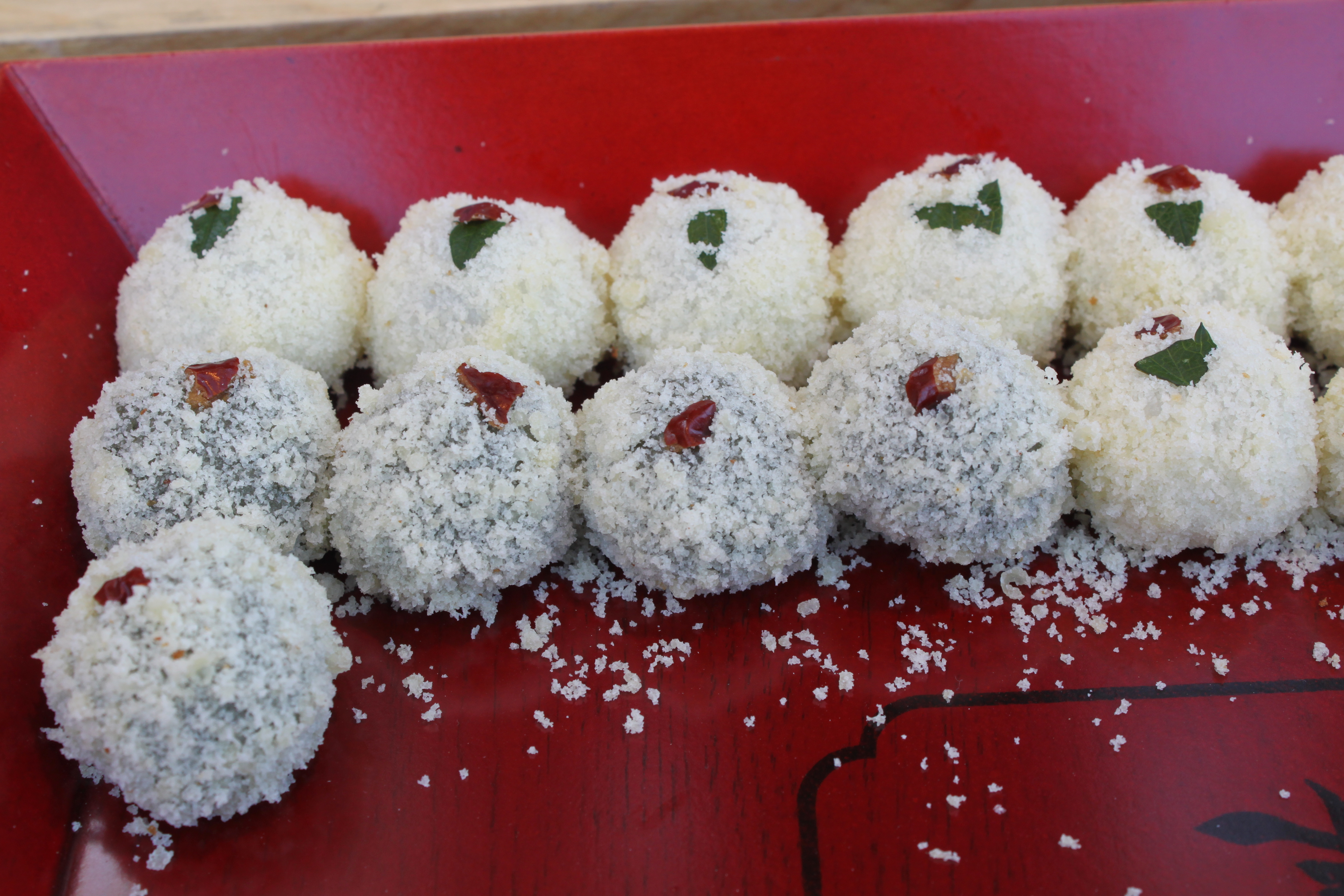

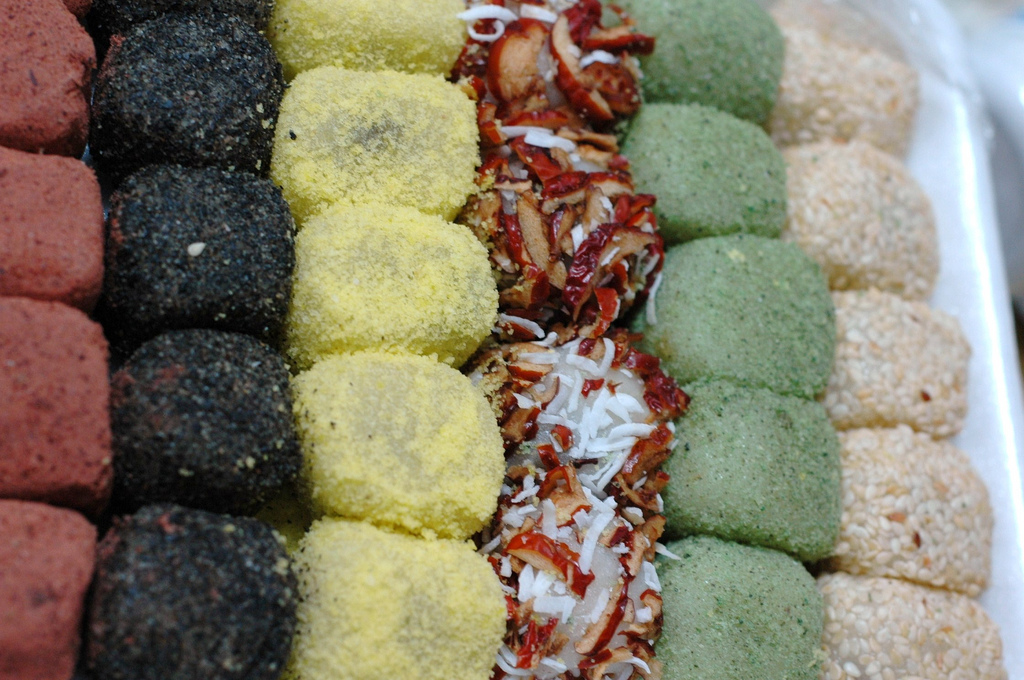

== See also ==
- Dango
- Danja
- Jian dui
