= Black adzuki bean =

Seed of Vigna angularis

- Species: Vigna angularis
- Origin: Korea

Korean name
- Hangul: 검은팥
- RR: geomeunpat
- MR: kŏmŭnp'at
- IPA: kʌ.mɯn.pʰat̚

Black adzuki beans are a variety of adzuki beans (Vigna angularis).

In Korean, they are called geomeunpat (검은팥; "black adzuki beans"), geomjeongpat (검정팥; "black adzuki beans"), heukdu (흑두; 黑豆; "black beans"), or heuksodu (흑소두; 黑小豆; "black small beans"). Gugeupbang eonhae, a 1466 medical book, mentions it using the name geomeunpɑt (거믄ᄑᆞᆺ).

The skin is thinner than that of the usual red adzuki beans, thus it is often husked prior to cooking, which gave this cultivar the name geopipat (거피팥; "dehulled adzuki beans"). White adzuki bean powder (geopipat-gomul) and white adzuki bean paste (geopipat-so) made from husked black adzuki beans are used in Korean rice cakes and confections.

Confusingly, the Japanese Okinawan kuroazuki (黒小豆; "black adzuki beans") are not adzuki beans, but black cowpeas (Vigna unguiculata).
