= Rice flour =

Flours made from finely milled rice

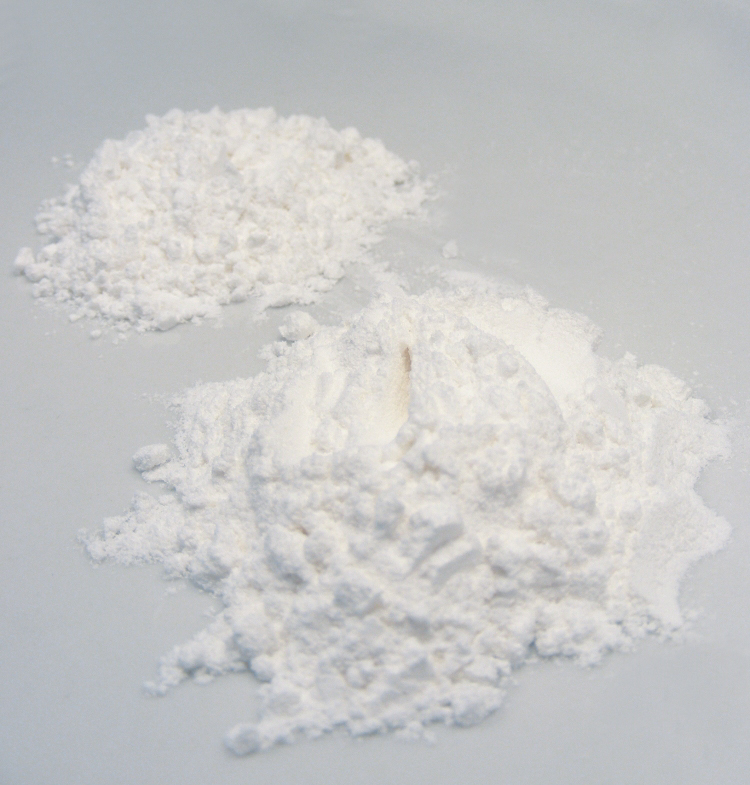
Rice flour and glutinous rice flour

Rice flour (also rice powder) is a form of flour made from finely milled rice. It is distinct from rice starch, which is usually produced by steeping rice in lye. Rice flour is a common substitute for wheat flour. It is also used as a thickening agent in recipes that are refrigerated or frozen since it inhibits liquid separation.

Rice flour may be made from either white rice, brown rice or glutinous rice. To make the flour, the husk of rice or paddy is removed and raw rice is obtained, which is then ground to flour.

== Types and names ==
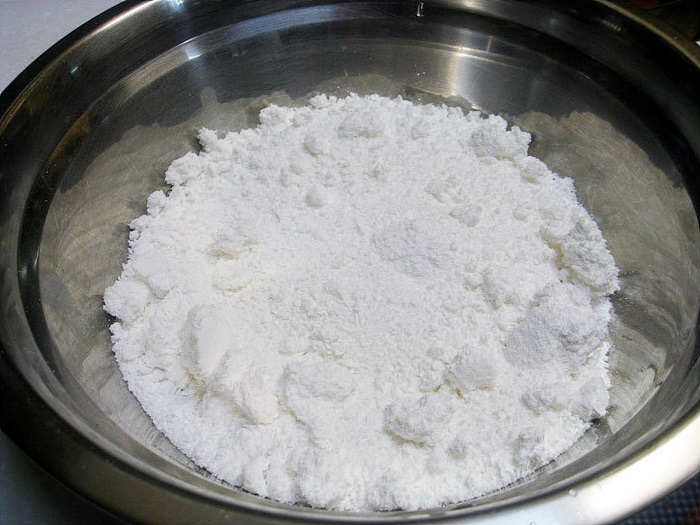
Wet-milled rice flour

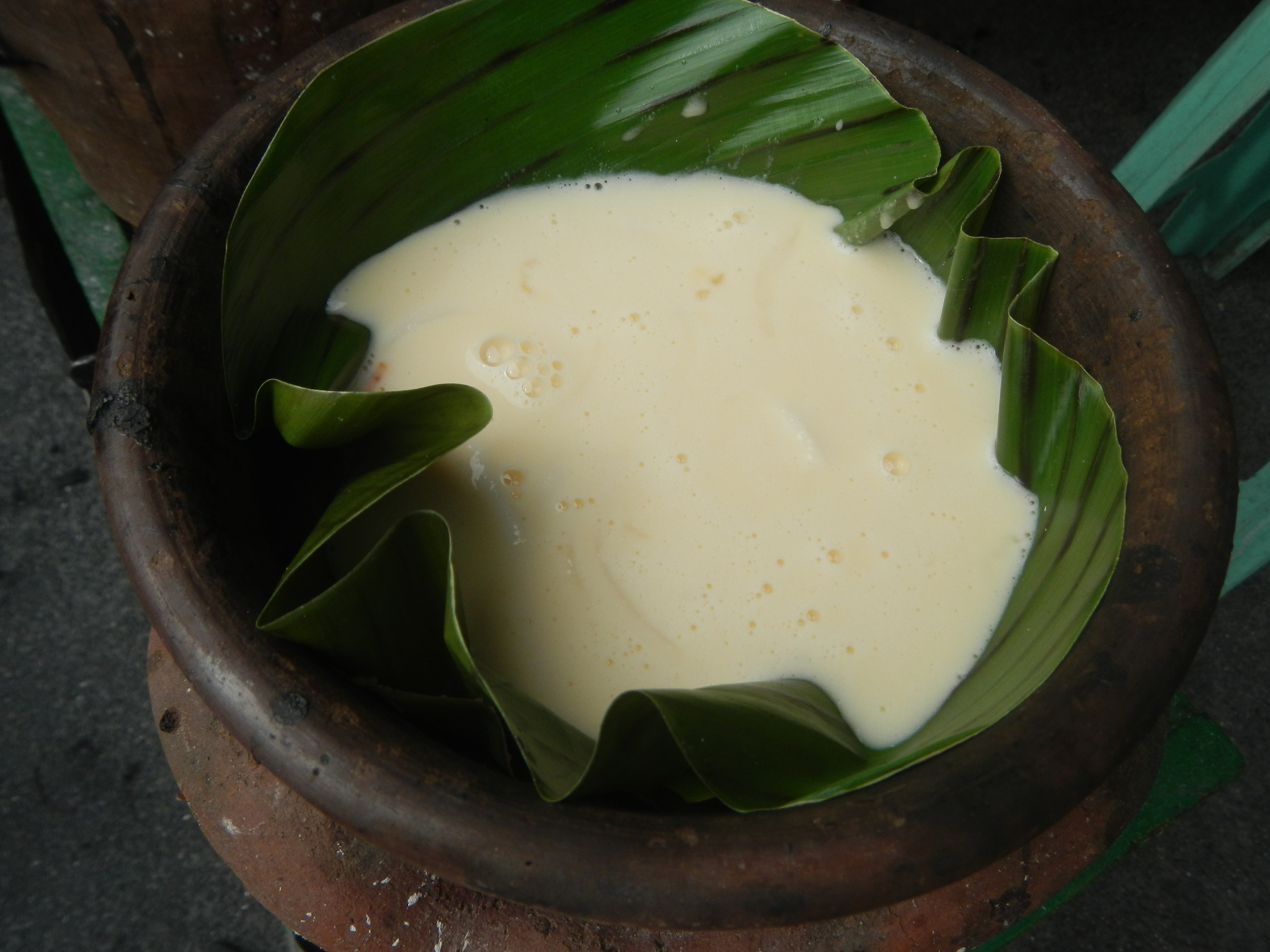
Galapóng being baked into bibingka

=== By rice ===
Rice flour can be made from indica, japonica, and wild rice varieties. Usually, rice flour (Chinese: 米粉; pinyin: mǐfěn, Japanese: 米粉, romanized: komeko, Korean: 쌀가루, romanized: ssal-garu, Vietnamese: bột gạo, Thai: แป้งข้าวเจ้า, romanized: paeng khao chao, Lao: ແປ້ງເຂົ້າຈ້າວ, romanized: pèng khao chao, Khmer: ម្សៅអង្ករ, romanized: msau ângkâ, Burmese: ဆန်မှုန့်, romanized: hcan hmun, Malay: tepung beras, Turkish: pirinç) refers to flour made from non-glutinous white rice.

When made with glutinous rice (or sweet rice), it is called glutinous rice flour or sweet rice flour (Chinese: 糯米粉; pinyin: nuòmǐ fěn, Japanese: 白玉粉; romanized: shiratamako, Korean: 찹쌀가루, romanized: chapssal-garu). In Japan, the glutinous rice flour produced from ground cooked glutinous rice, used to make mochi, is called mochigomeko (Japanese: もち米粉, or mochiko for short). In comparison to the glutinous rice flour, non-glutinous rice flour (Chinese: 粘米粉; pinyin: zhānmǐ fěn, Japanese: 上新粉; romanized: jōshinko, Korean: 멥쌀가루, romanized: mepssal-garu) can be specified as so.

When made with brown rice with only the inedible outer hull removed, it is called brown rice flour (Chinese: 糙米粉; pinyin: cāomǐ fěn, Korean: 현미가루, romanized: hyeonmi-garu). Flour made from black, red, and green rice are each called as black rice flour (Korean: 흑미가루, romanized: heungmi-garu), red rice flour (Korean: 홍미가루, romanized: hongmi-garu), green rice flour (Korean: 녹미가루, romanized: nongmi-garu). In comparison to brown rice flour, white rice flour (Chinese: 白米粉; pinyin: báimǐ fěn, Korean: 백미가루, romanized: baengmi-garu) can be specified as so.

=== By milling methods ===
Different milling methods also produce different types of rice flour. Rice flour can be dry-milled from dry rice grains, or wet-milled from rice grains that were soaked in water prior to milling. Usually, "rice flour" refers to dry-milled rice flour (Korean: 건식 쌀가루, romanized: geonsik ssal-garu), which can be stored on a shelf. In Korea, wet-milled rice flour (Korean: 습식 쌀가루, romanized: seupsik ssal-garu) is made from rice that was soaked in water, drained, ground using a stone-mill, and then optionally sifted. Like moderately moist sand, wet-milled rice flour forms an easily breakable lump when squeezed with a hand. It is usually stored in the freezer. In the Philippines, rice flour is not traditionally prepared dry. Rather, it is made by first soaking uncooked glutinous rice overnight (usually allowing it to slightly ferment) then grinding the results (traditionally with stone mills) into a rich and smooth viscous rice dough known as galapóng.

== Uses ==
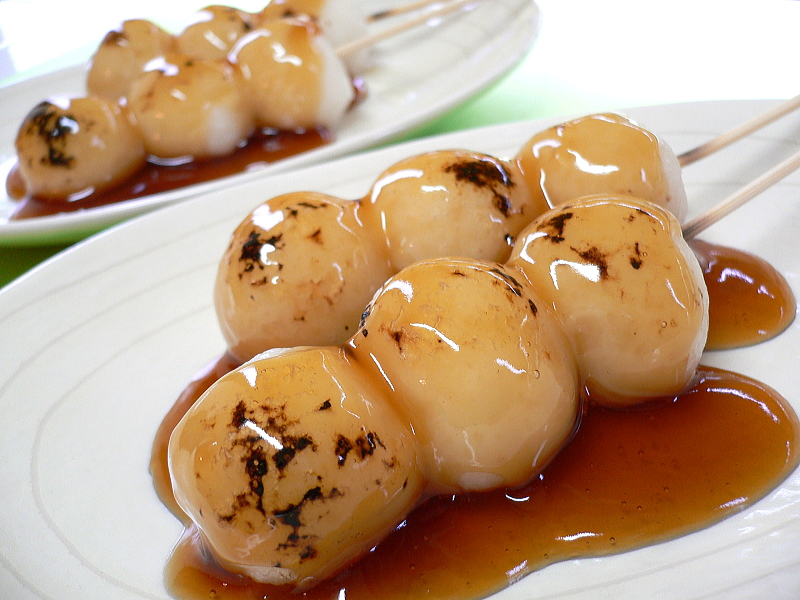
Japanese mitarashi dango, a sweet dumpling

=== Culinary ===
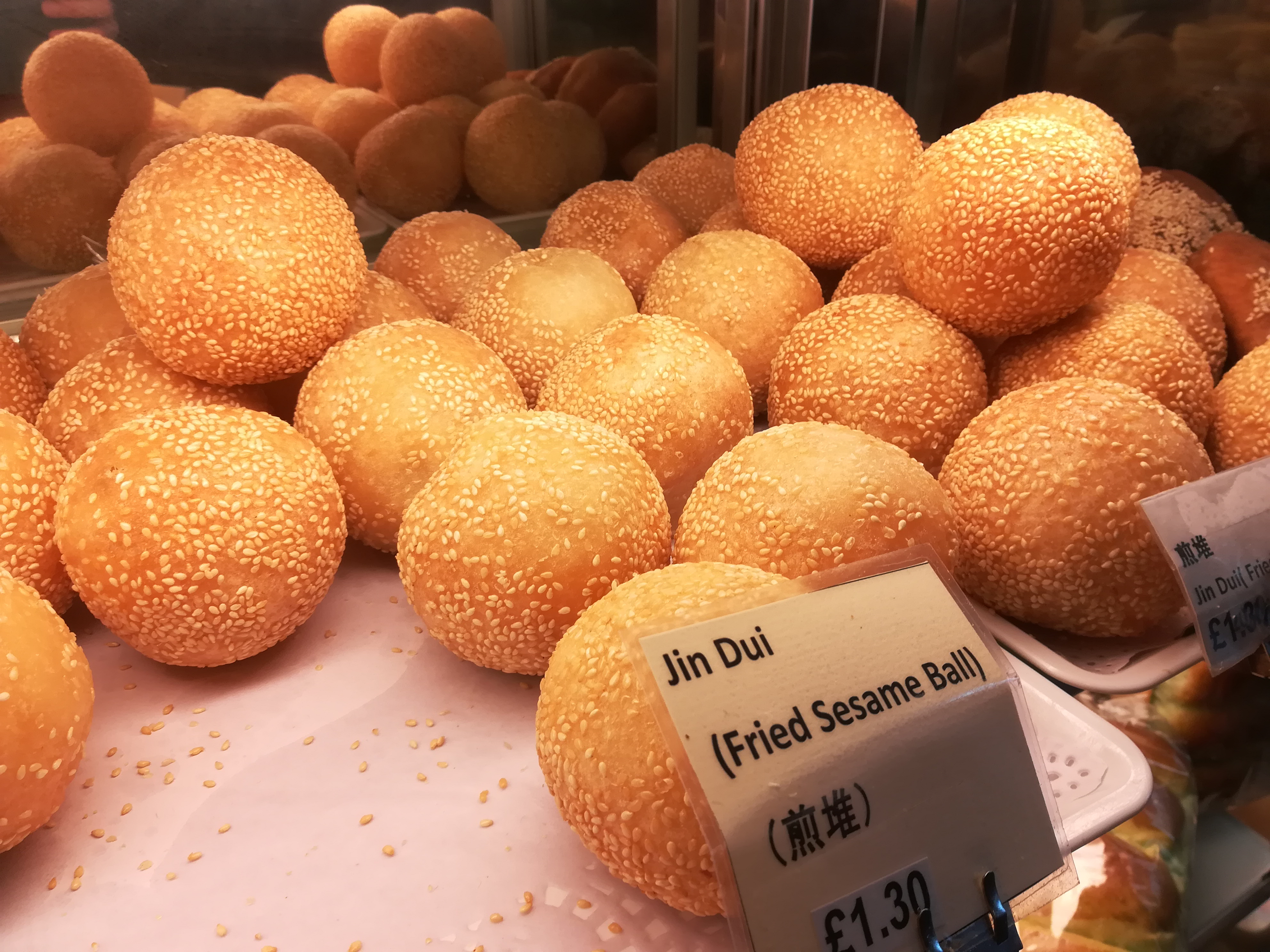
Chinese jian dui, fried balls of rice flour and sesame

Rice flour can be used to make confections like rice cakes, macaroons and some types of buns due to the texture and flavor it lends the finished products. It is also used for dusting confections in a manner similar to powdered sugar.

==== East Asia ====
Women singing while grinding rice

In China, rice flour is used to make foods like jian dui, tangyuan, nian gao, qingtuan, and yuanxiao.

In Japan, cooked glutinous rice flour, called mochigomeko (or mochiko for short) is used to create mochi and dango or as a thickener for sauces. Uncooked glutinous rice flour, shiratamako, is often used to produce confectioneries. The non-glutinous rice flour jōshinko is primarily used for creating confectioneries.

In Korea, rice flour made from different rice varieties and with different milling methods are used for different types of tteok (rice cakes) and hangwa (confections). Glutinous rice flour, chapssal-garu, is used for making chapssal-tteok (glutinous rice cakes) and gochujang (chili paste), as well as rice glue for kimchi. Non-glutinous rice flour can also be used to make porridge- or gruel-like dishes such as beombeok, juk, mieum, and dangsu.

==== Southeast Asia ====
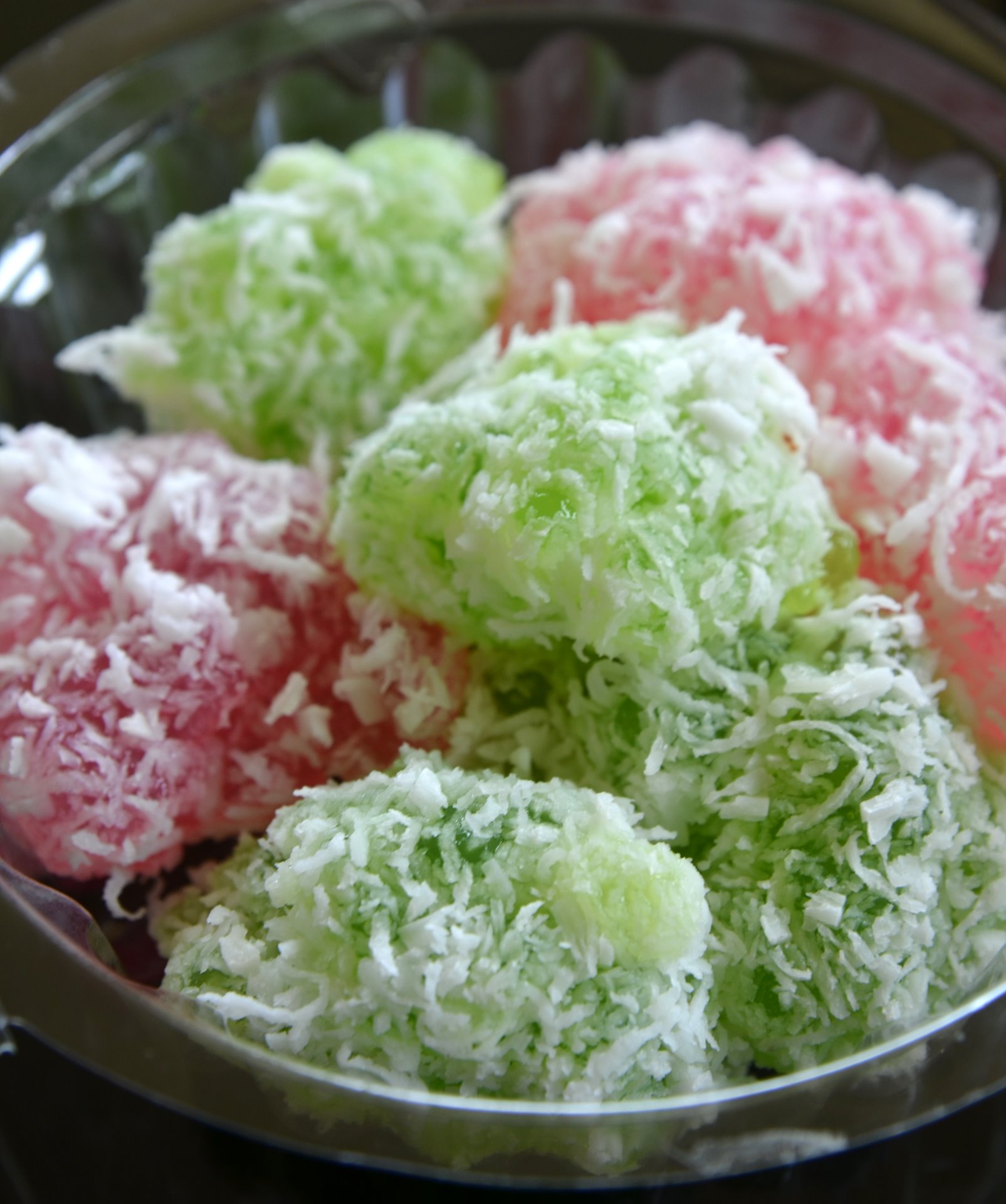
Thai khanom tom

In the Philippines, galapóng, glutinous rice dough, is the basis for numerous types of native rice cakes and desserts (kakanin). Depending on the dish, coconut milk (gata), wood ash lye, and various other ingredients may be added to the galapóng. The galapóng can be prepared baked, steamed, boiled, or fried, resulting in dishes like puto or bibingka.

==== South Asia ====
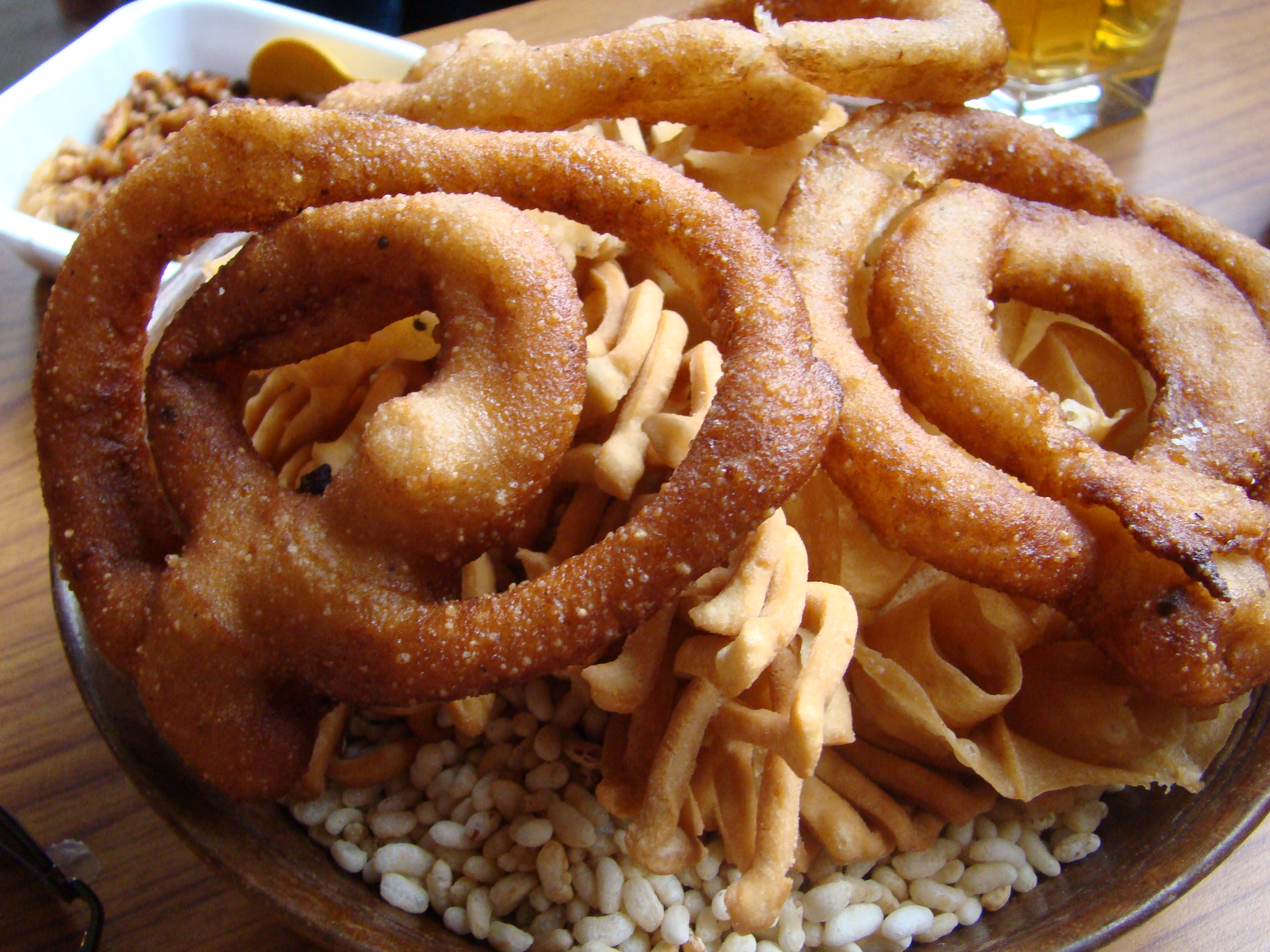
Nepalese sel roti

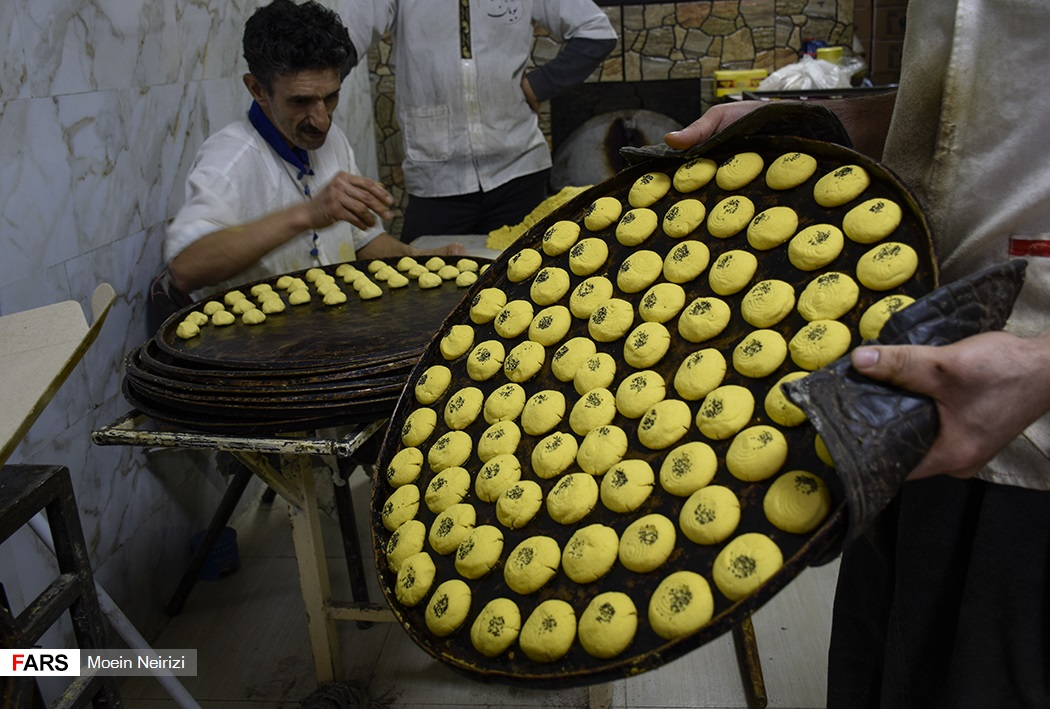
Persian nan-e berenji

In South India, rice flour is used for dishes like dosa, puttu, chakkuli, golibaje (Mangalore bajji) and kori rotti. It is also mixed with wheat, millet, other cereal flours, and sometimes dried fruits or vegetables to make manni, a kind of baby food.. Rice flour is used to make bhakari in the Konkan region in western India.

In Bangladesh, rice flour is a regular ingredient. In the Bengali and Assamese cuisines of eastern India, it is used in making roti and desserts such as sandesh and pitha. It is also used in making kheer, a common dessert in the Indian subcontinent.

In Sri Lanka, it is used in making many household food products. Among them are pittu, appa (hoppers), indi appa (string hoppers) and sweets such as kewum, kokis and athirasa. It can also be used in making bread and other bakery products.

In Nepal, Newars use rice flour to make yomari and chataamari. Sel roti is another well-known rice flour based food commonly eaten in Nepal and in the Sikkim and Darjeeling regions of India. Sel roti is known as shinghal in Kumaon.

==== Central America ====
Rice flour is also used in the Central American dish pupusas as a substitute for regular flour.

=== Non-culinary ===
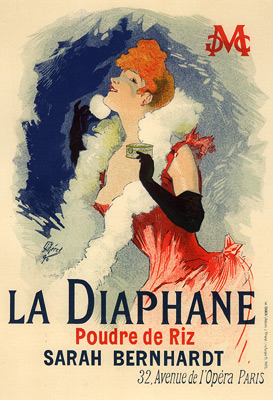
La Diaphane, Poudre de riz, rice flour used as a cosmetic, endorsed by Sarah Bernhardt

==== Cosmetics ====
Rice flour is used in the cosmetics industry.

==== Mushroom cultivation ====
Brown rice flour can be combined with vermiculite for use as a substrate for the cultivation of mushrooms. Hard cakes of colonised substrate can then be fruited in a humid container. This method is often (though not always) employed by growers of edible mushrooms, as it is a very simple and low-cost method of growing mushrooms.
