= Choi Sang-ok =

South Korean restaurateur (1928–2015)

Choi Sang-ok (Korean: 최상옥; Hanja: 崔尙玉, 1928–2015) was a South Korean restaurateur. She was the founder of Korean restaurant YongSuSan, the first restaurant in South Korea to adopt western styles of service (dining, waiting staff, etc.) with Korean food. She was born and raised in Kaesong.

Her restaurant was named after a mountain in Kaesong. It specializes in Kaesong-style and Korean royal court cuisine.
