= Tarak-juk =

Korean milk rice porridge

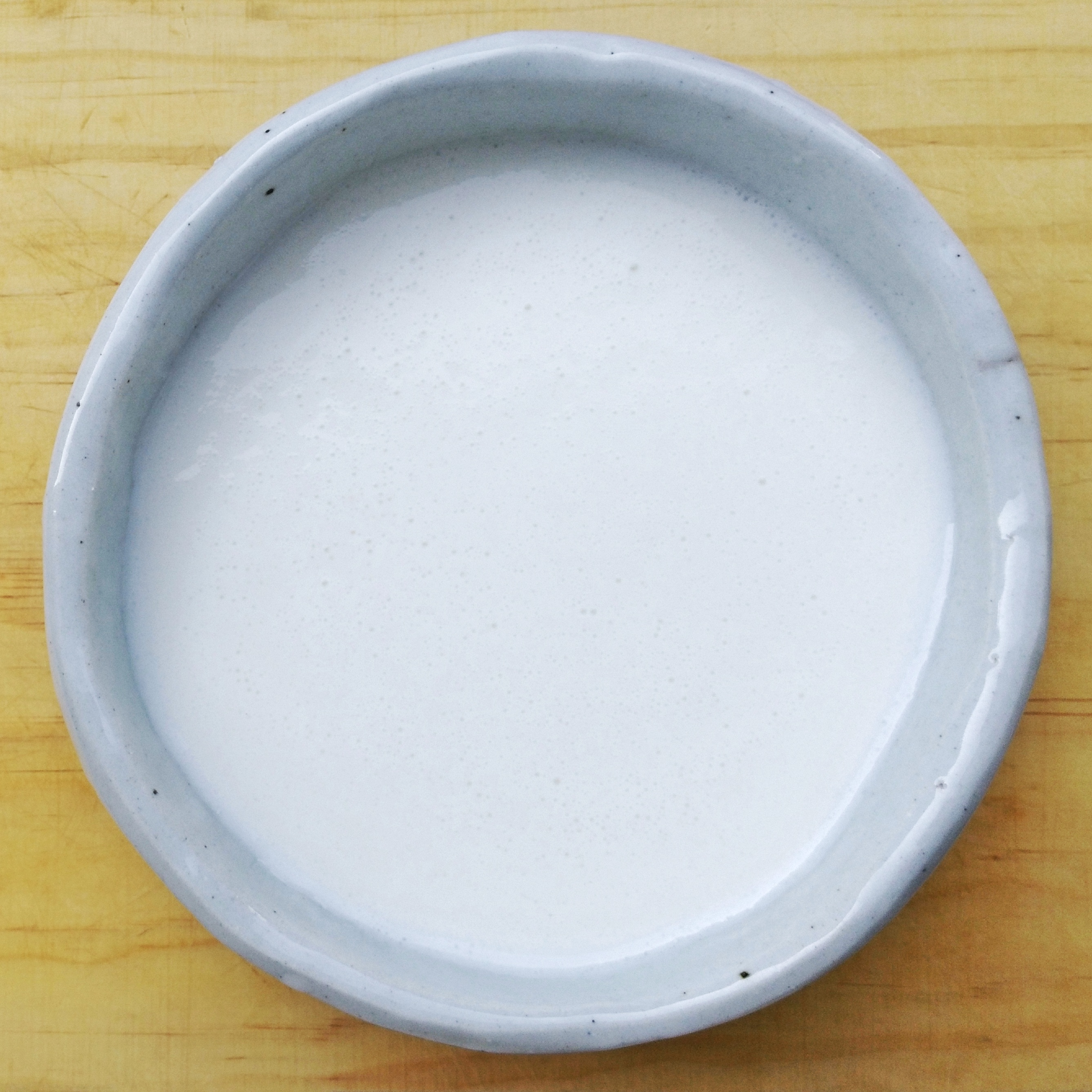
- Alternative names: Uyu-juk, milk porridge
- Type: Juk
- Place of origin: Korea
- Associated cuisine: Korean cuisine
- Serving temperature: Warm
- Main ingredients: Milk, ground rice

Korean name
- Hangul: 타락죽
- Hanja: 駝酪粥
- RR: tarakjuk
- MR: t'arakchuk
- IPA: [tʰa.ɾak̚.t͈ɕuk̚]

Alternate name
- Hangul: 우유죽
- Hanja: 牛乳粥
- RR: uyujuk
- MR: uyujuk
- IPA: [u.ju.dʑuk̚]

Tarak-juk (Korean: 타락죽), also called uyu-juk (Korean: 우유죽) or milk porridge, is a juk, or Korean porridge, made with milk and rice (glutinous japonica variety). It was a part of the Korean royal court cuisine and was also patronized by yangban (scholarly-officials).

== Names and etymology ==
The Korean word tarak-juk (타락죽, [tʰa.ɾak̚.t͈ɕuk̚]) is a compound consisting of tarak (타락, [tʰa.ɾak̚]) meaning "dairy" and juk (죽, [tɕuk̚]) meaning "porridge".

The word tarak is derived from the Korean transliteration of the Mongolian word taraq (ᠲ᠋‍ᠠ‍᠊ᠷ‍ᠠ‍᠊ᠬ) or Old Turkic torak. Cognates include modern Mongolian tarag (тараг) and Kurdish toraq, both meaning "cheese". As suggested by its etymology, traditional Korean tarak was heavily influenced by the customs of Central Asian—especially Mongolian— fermented milk products.

== History ==
The history of tarak-juk dates back to the consumption of milk in Korean history. The Goryeo (918–1392) government kept Yuso (dairy cow office), and nobles consumed nakso (cheese). However, dairy cattle were rare and usually milk was available only after a cow gave birth. Moreover, the freshness of milk was a vital factor as it could not be delivered over long distances. Therefore, milk was considered a supplementary food for special occasions or a recovery food after illness.

During the Joseon era (1392–1897), the dairy cow office was relocated to a royal court ranch on the mountain Naksan east of Seoul. It was renamed Tarak-saek (dairy department). Royal physicians took charge of gathering milk and making tarak-juk to present to the king. From the tenth lunar month to the first month of the next lunar year, they offered tarak-juk to the royal court. The Hall of Senior Officials also offered tarak-juk to elderly officials. Recipes for tarak-juk are recorded in the Joseon books such as Revised and Augmented Farm Management and the Women's Encyclopedia.

== Preparation ==
Pre-soaked glutinous rice is ground by millstone, sieved, and left to settle. The deposits of ground rice, called muri, are boiled, and milk is added slowly on a gentle simmer over a low flame with constant stirring. Salt is then added, to sweeten the porridge, honey can be added. The ratio between milk and muri recorded in the Women's Encyclopedia is 1:0.8, with adjustments allowed according to taste. However, the book advises the amount of muri should not exceed that of milk.

== See also ==
- Jatjuk
- Korean royal court cuisine
- List of porridges
