= Jook =

Jook may refer to:

- Juk (Korean food), Korean rice porridge
- Juke joint, informal social establishment

== See also ==
- Congee, East Asian rice porridge, pronounced [tsʊ́k] in Cantonese and romanized jook [d͡ʒʊ́k] in some Cantonese diasporic communities
