= Korean stew =

Korean stew may refer to

- Jjigae, a Korean dish similar to a Western stew.
- Jeongol, a category of elaborate stews or casseroles in Korean cuisine
