= Mieum =

Mieum may refer to:

- Mieum (hangul)
- Mieum (food)
