= Sinseollo =

Korean hot pot dish

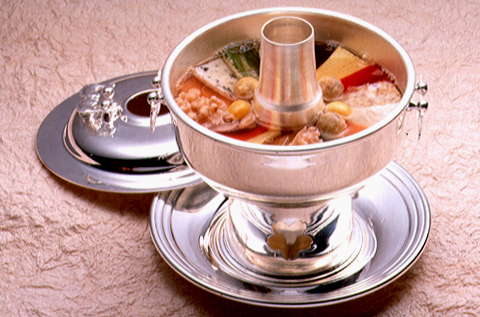
- Alternative names: Royal hot pot
- Type: Jeongol
- Place of origin: Korea
- Main ingredients: Meat, fish, vegetables
- Ingredients generally used: rock tripe, walnut, ginkgo, chestnut, pine nut, egg garnish, dried chili threads, jangguk (soup soy sauce broth)
- Food energy (per 4 portions serving): 310 kcal (1,300 kJ)

Korean name
- Hangul: 신선로
- Hanja: 神仙爐
- RR: sinseollo
- MR: sinsŏllo
- IPA: [ɕin.sʌl.lo]

Sinseollo (Korean: 신선로; Hanja: 神仙爐) or royal hot pot is an elaborate dish consisting of meatballs, small and round jeonyueo (전유어), mushrooms, and vegetables cooked in a rich broth in Korean royal court cuisine. The dish is a form of jeongol (elaborate chowder-like stew). It is served in a large bundt pan-shaped vessel with a hole in the center, in which hot embers are placed to keep the dish hot throughout the meal.

== Etymology and history ==
Sinseollo is the proper name for the cooking vessel in which this dish is served, which has come to mean the actual dish as well. Sinseollo is a composite word of sinseon (신선; 神仙), "Taoist immortal spirit" and ro (로; 爐), brazier. Jeong Hui-ryang, a scholar in the court of Joseon Dynasty's King Yeonsan, turned to a hermit-like life in the mountains after being exiled and disillusioned from politics. He made a small brazier to cook his meals, a portable cooking vessel that would cook various vegetables in a single pot. He disappeared in the mountains and legend says he became a sinseon, so the cooking vessel was named "brazier for a sinseon".

Sinseollo is also called yeolguja tang, which literally means "a tang (soup) that makes a mouth happy".

== Preparation and serving ==
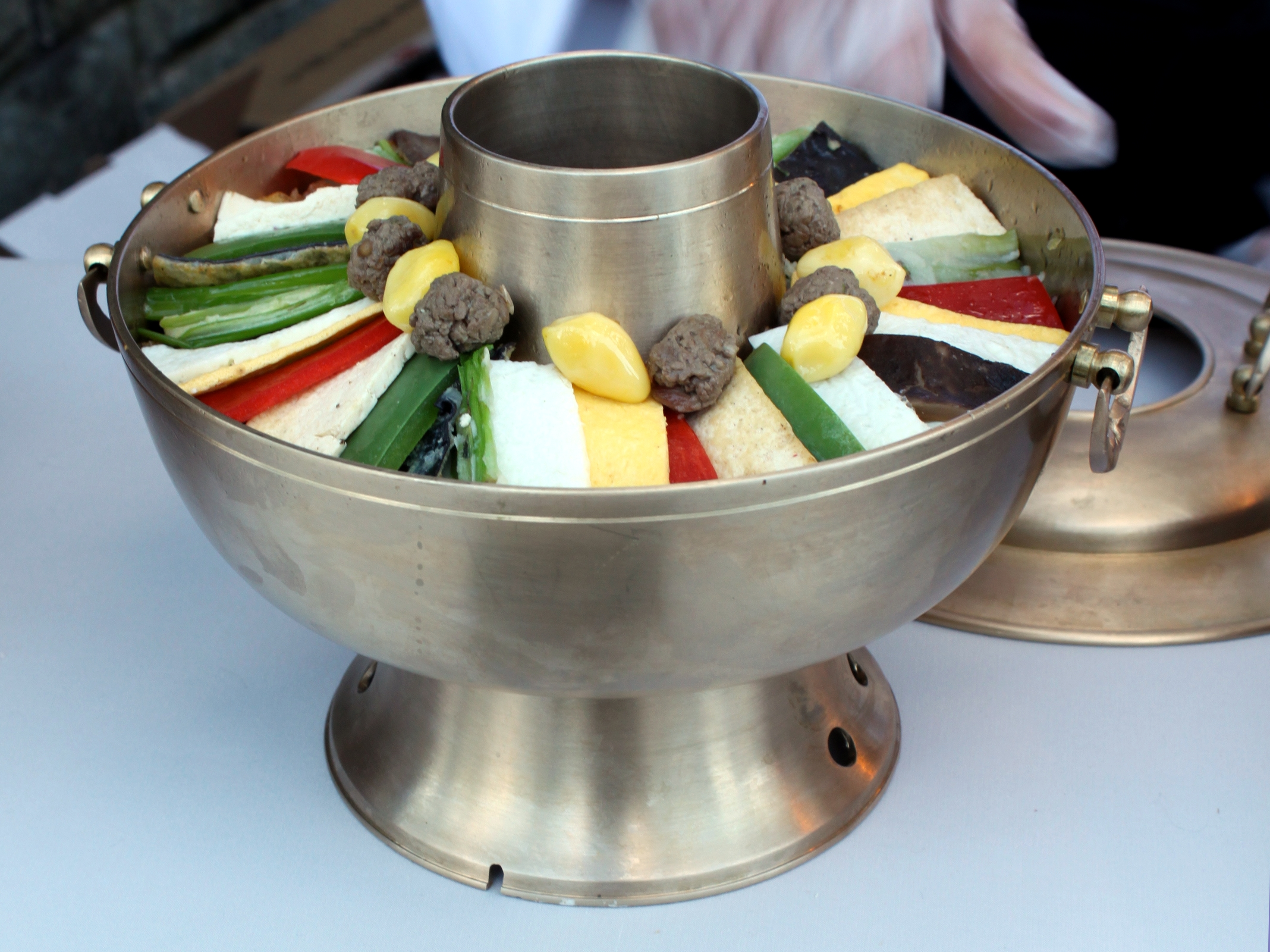
Vegetable sinseollo

Although the origin of the dish was based on vegetables, meat and fish were added in later years. Up to 25 ingredients may be used in making the dish, such as beef, pork, chicken, pheasant, fish, abalone, sea cucumbers, and various vegetables. Boiled beef and sliced mu are placed in the dish with seasoned beef and the seafood. Mushrooms, carrots and other vegetables are placed next, with meatballs, walnuts, pine nuts, ginkgo nuts, and finely shredded red pepper used as garnish to create a colorful balance. Soup stock is poured over and then the dish is cooked with charcoal in the burner.

== See also ==
- Gujeolpanalso the new royal plate
- Korean royal court cuisine
- List of cooking vessels
- List of soups
- Korean cuisine
- Dae Jang Geum
