= Jeongol =

Korean stew varieties

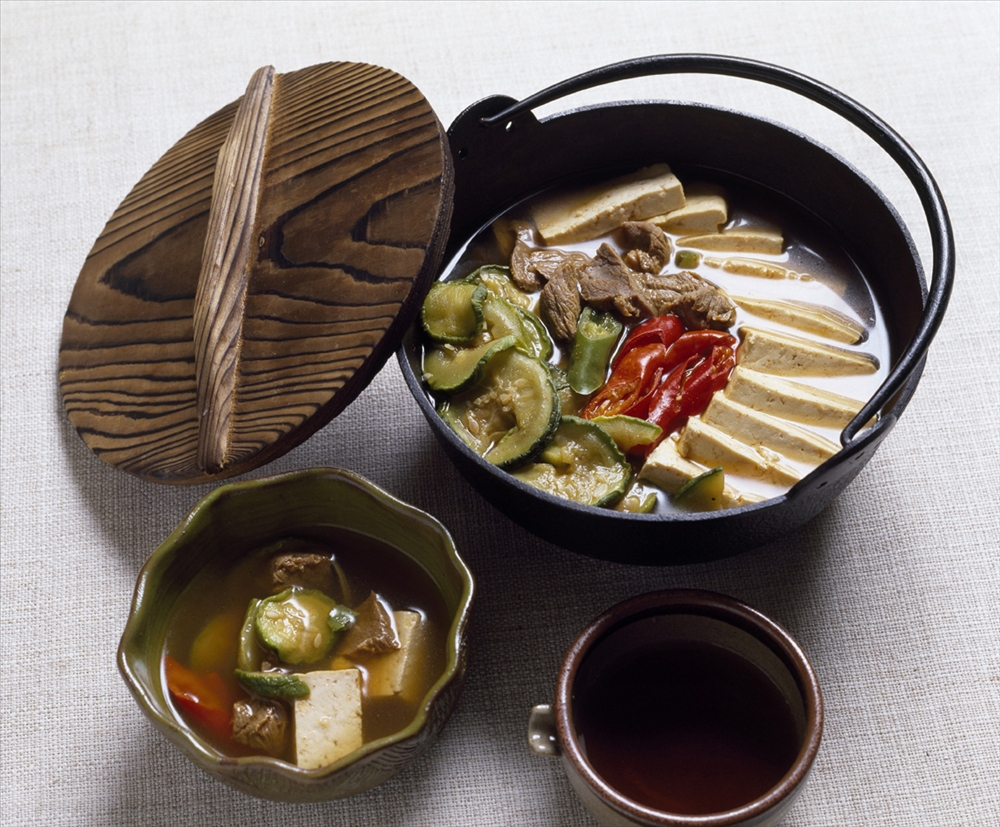
- Tofu jeongol (dubu-jeongol; top and in left bowl)
- Type: Hot pot
- Place of origin: Korea
- Region or state: East Asia
- Main ingredients: Various
- Similar dishes: Nabe

Korean name
- Hangul: 전골
- RR: jeongol
- MR: chŏn'gol
- IPA: [tɕʌn.ɡol]

Jeongol (Korean: 전골) is a Korean-style hot pot made by putting meat, mushroom, seafood, seasoning, etc., in a stew pot, adding broth, and boiling it. It is similar to the category of Korean stews called jjigae, with the main difference being that jjigae are generally made with only a single main ingredient, and named after that ingredient (such as kimchi jjigae or sundubu jjigae), while jeongol usually contain a variety of main ingredients. An additional difference is that jeongol (like gujeolpan) was originally a dish for upper-class Koreans and members of the royal court, while jjigae was a simpler dish for commoners.

== History ==
According to the late Joseon era book Manguksamulkiwon Yeoksa (만국사물기원역사; 萬國事物紀原歷史; lit. 'The History of Various Objects From Around the World'), jeongol originated from ancient times when soldiers would cook their food in iron helmets during times of war for lack of cooking utensils. In other Joseon era documents such as Kyeongdo Jabji (경도잡지; 京都雜志), it is mentioned that jeongol was cooked in a vessel called jeolliptu (전립투; lit. 'soldier's hat') because it resembled a soldier's helmet. In Siuijeonseo, it is mentioned that thinly sliced seasoned beef was cooked in a pot and sprinkled with pine nut powder, and occasionally cooked with bamboo shoots, baby octopus and oysters.

== Preparation ==
Jeongol usually contains sliced beef or seafood, vegetables, mushrooms, and other seasonings, which are boiled with a small amount of broth in a jeongolteul (전골틀, pot used for cooking jeongol). They may also include mandu (dumplings). Some jeongol are spicy, containing added gochujang or chili pepper powder, although these ingredients may be omitted. The variety of broth used varies according to the type of jeongol being prepared.

== Varieties ==
- Beoseot jeongol (버섯전골) - made with mushrooms
- Bosin jeongol (보신전골) - made with dog meat
- Dubu jeongol (두부전골) - made with tofu
- Gaksaek jeongol (각색전골) - made with various ingredients.
- Gopchang jeongol (곱창전골) - made with beef offal
- Haemul jeongol (해물전골) - made with seafood
- Mandu jeongol (만두전골) - made with mandu
- Nakji jeongol (낙지전골) - made with small octopus
- Sinseollo (신선로) - a variety of jeongol formerly served in Korean royal court cuisine
- Sogogi jeongol (소고기전골) - made with beef but no seafood

== See also ==
- Jjigae, another category of stew from Korea
- Hot pot
- Nabemono, a similar variety of dishes from Japan
- Oden
- Pot-au-feu
- Korean royal court cuisine
- List of casserole dishes
- List of Korean dishes
- List of soups
