= Mieum (food) =

Korean traditional gruel

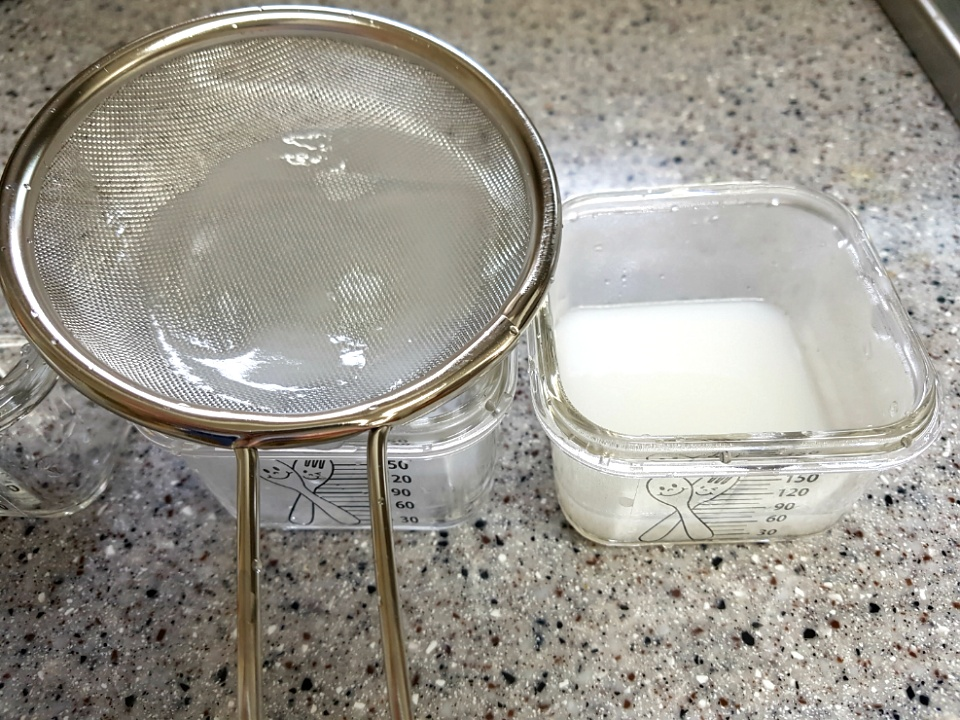
- Sieved rice mieum as baby food
- Type: Gruel
- Place of origin: Korea
- Associated cuisine: Korean cuisine
- Main ingredients: Rice or foxtail millet

Korean name
- Hangul: 미음
- Hanja: 米飮
- RR: mieum
- MR: miŭm
- IPA: [mi.ɯm]

Mieum (Korean: 미음; Hanja: 米飮) is a thin, strained gruel made from white rice, white glutinous rice, foxtail millet, or glutinous foxtail millet. It is often used in liquid diets for patients and for recently weaned children. A thinner mieum, made from rice water or mixed with powdered milk, is sometimes used as a breast milk substitute for younger babies.

== Preparation and varieties ==
Rice or foxtail millet is soaked for at least 2 hours before being drained and boiled, usually at a ratio of 1 part grain to 10 parts water. It is simmered until sodden and mushy, then strained through a double sieve. The sieved gruel is then warmed again and served with two small dishes of salt and cheongjang (clear soup soy sauce).

=== Sok-mieum ===
Sok-mieum (속미음; 粟米飮) is a mieum made with jujube, chestnut, and ginseng. Thinly sliced ginseng is simmered for an hour, and the water is used to make sok-mieum. Glutinous rice or glutinous foxtail millet, jujube, and chestnut is prepared in the same way: boiling until mushy and double-sieving. Glutinous rice-based sok-mieum is seasoned with sugar, while glutinous foxtail millet-based sok-mieum is seasoned with salt before being served.

== See also ==
- Juk – Korean porridges
- Eungi – Korean grain starch porridges
- Congee – Asian rice porridges
- List of porridges
