= Gujeolpan =

Plate of nine Korean foods

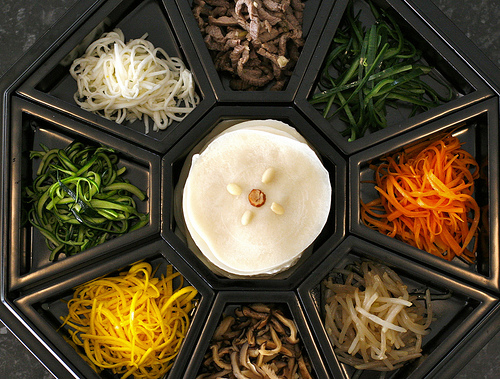

Korean name
- Hangul: 구절판
- Hanja: 九節坂
- RR: gujeolpan
- MR: kujŏlp'an

Gujeolpan (Korean: 구절판) refers to either an elaborate Korean dish consisting of nine different foods assorted on a wooden plate with nine divided sections in an octagon shape or the plate itself. The name is composed of three hanja words: gu (구, "nine" ), jeol (절, "section"), and pan (판, "plate") in Korean. Foods are separated by color and ingredients, and comprise various namul (seasoned leaf vegetables), meats, mushrooms, and seafood items. In the center of the tray is a stack of small jeon (Korean style pancakes) made with wheat flour, which are called miljeonbyeong (밀전병). In addition to its use as a food platter used to serve many dishes of food at once, gujeolpan is also considered a decorative item. It is said to be a well-being food that looks beautiful, tastes good, and is nutritionally balanced.

== History and aesthetic appeal ==
The history of gujeolpan dates back as early as the 14th century, and has become closely associated with the Joseon royalty. The octagonal dish itself can be made of wood or plastic and is divided into eight side sections and one center section, to resemble a flower. It also can include elaborate carvings, gem encrustations and detailed drawings. Original royal gujeolpan dish platters can be observed in museums as featured artifacts in royal table setting reconstructions. Gujeolpan is considered to be one of the most beautiful and colorful centerpiece Korean dishes. The nine sections are carefully divided and arranged with an appropriate amount of assorted meats and vegetables to make it colorful and aesthetically appealing. It has even been said that author Pearl S. Buck was so amazed by the beauty and colorful appearance of gujeolpan that she could not stop praising it, and as a result, refused to eat it as she did not want to "destroy such a beautiful thing by eating it."

== Consumption ==
What was once available to Korean nobility can now be enjoyed by anyone in many places in Korea that specialize in preparing ancient Korean cuisine (though in some establishments it can be quite expensive). It is also sometimes prepared for wedding banquets. Each of the outer sections has different varieties of meat and vegetables, such as carrots, mushrooms, beef, bean sprouts, leeks, radishes, etc. while the center section is usually reserved for miljeonbyeong, which are small circular, paper-thin wheat flatcakes similar, though smaller and softer than tortillas. These are used to wrap the various meats and vegetables from each of the eight sections. Gujeolpan consumers pick and choose from the various eight sections, put the food on a sheet of miljeongbyeong, wrap it and eat it whole.

== Gallery ==
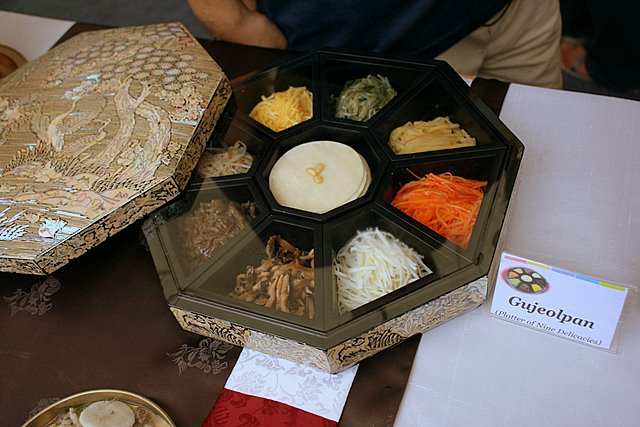
A gujeolpan plate made with mother of pearl.

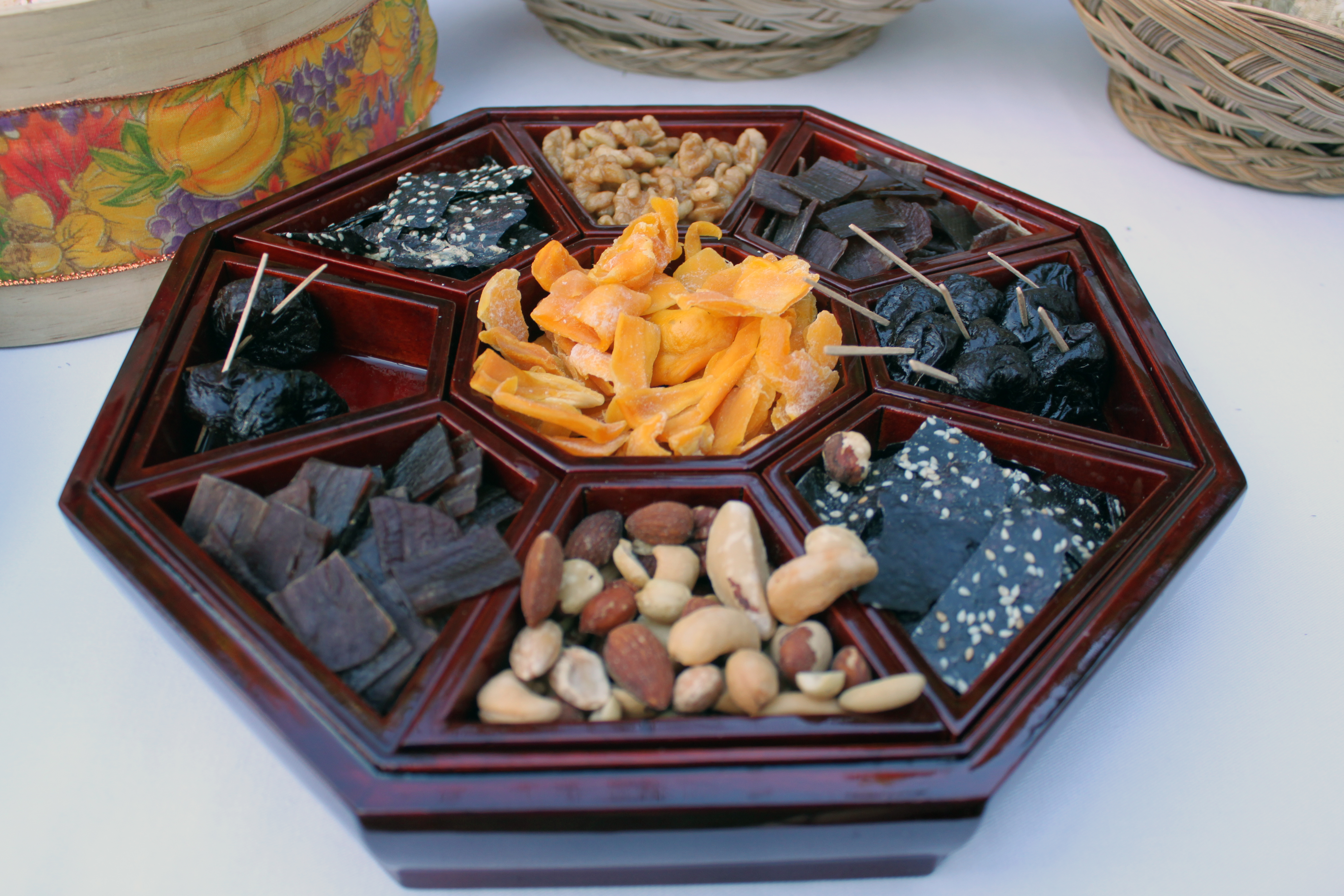
Gujeolpan containing mareun anju (dried foods for drinking alcoholic beverages).

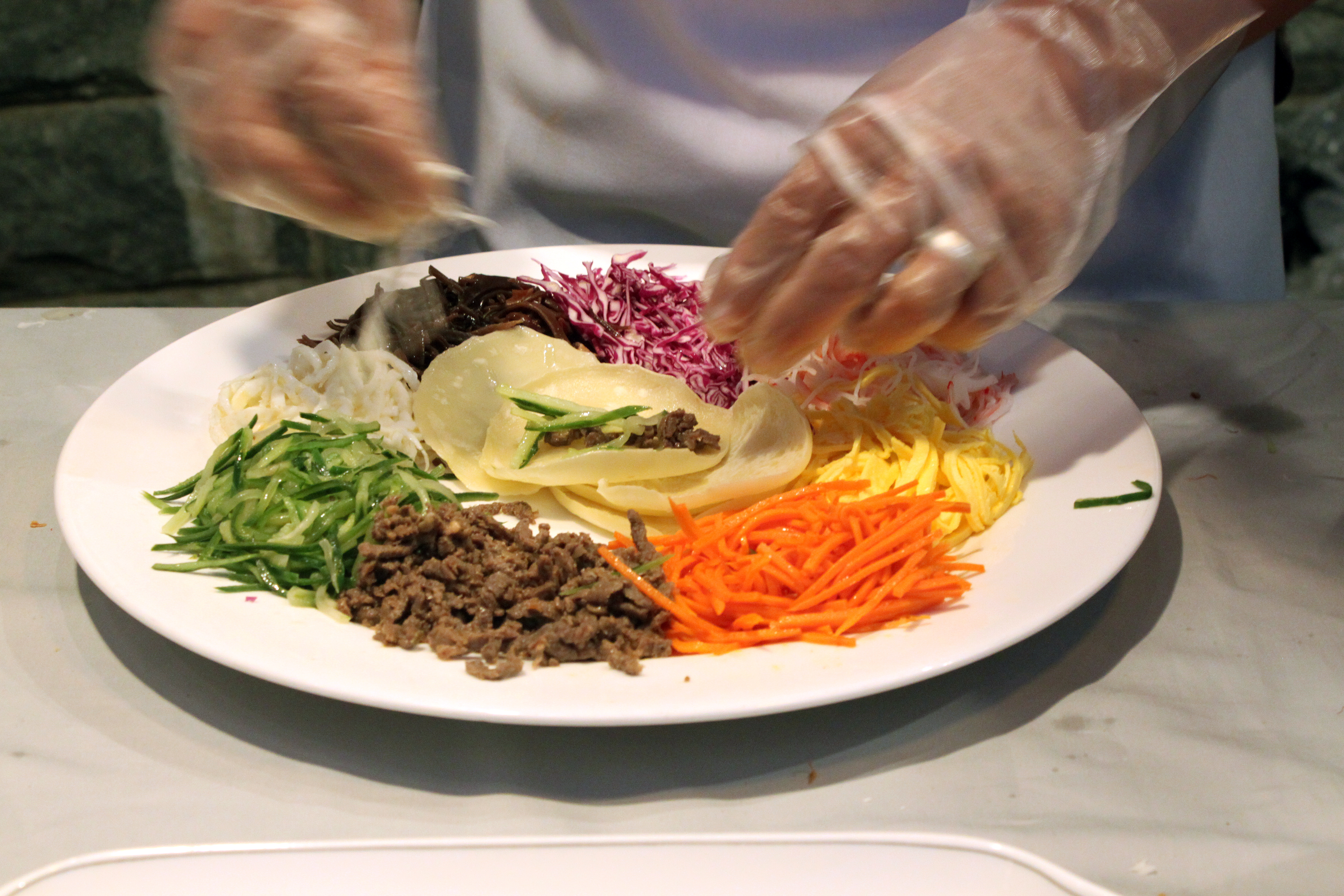
Preparation for gujeolpan

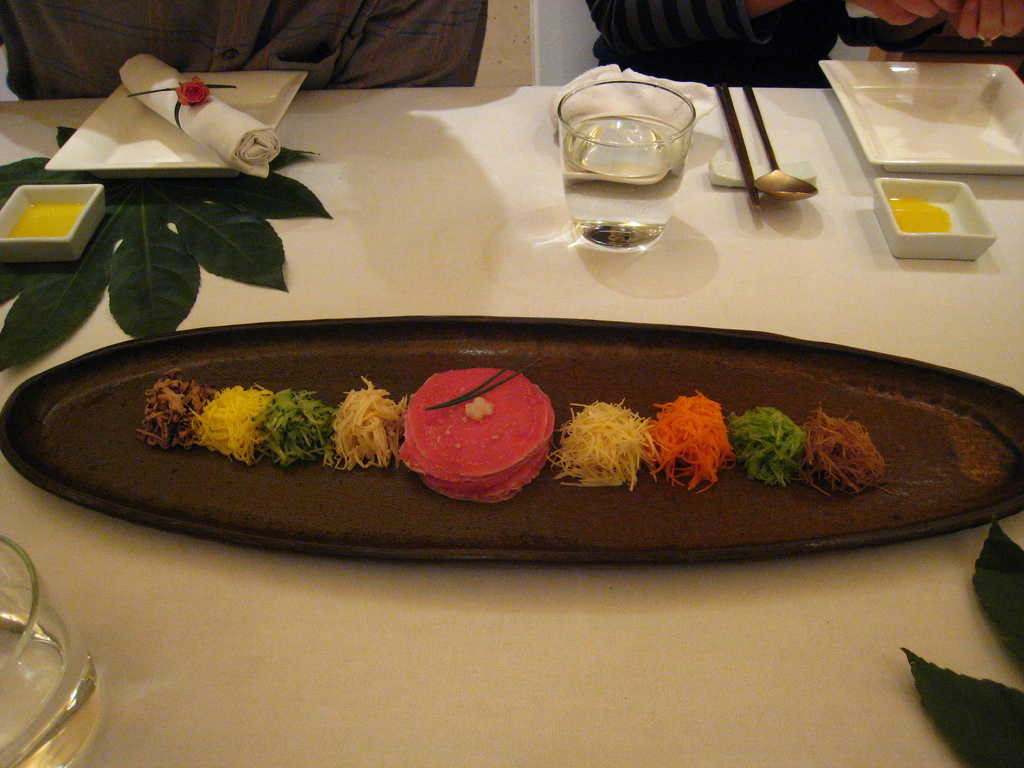
A variant of gujeolpan

== See also ==
- Sinseollo
- Jeon
- Ssam
- Namul
- Korean royal court cuisine
