= Korean royal court cuisine =

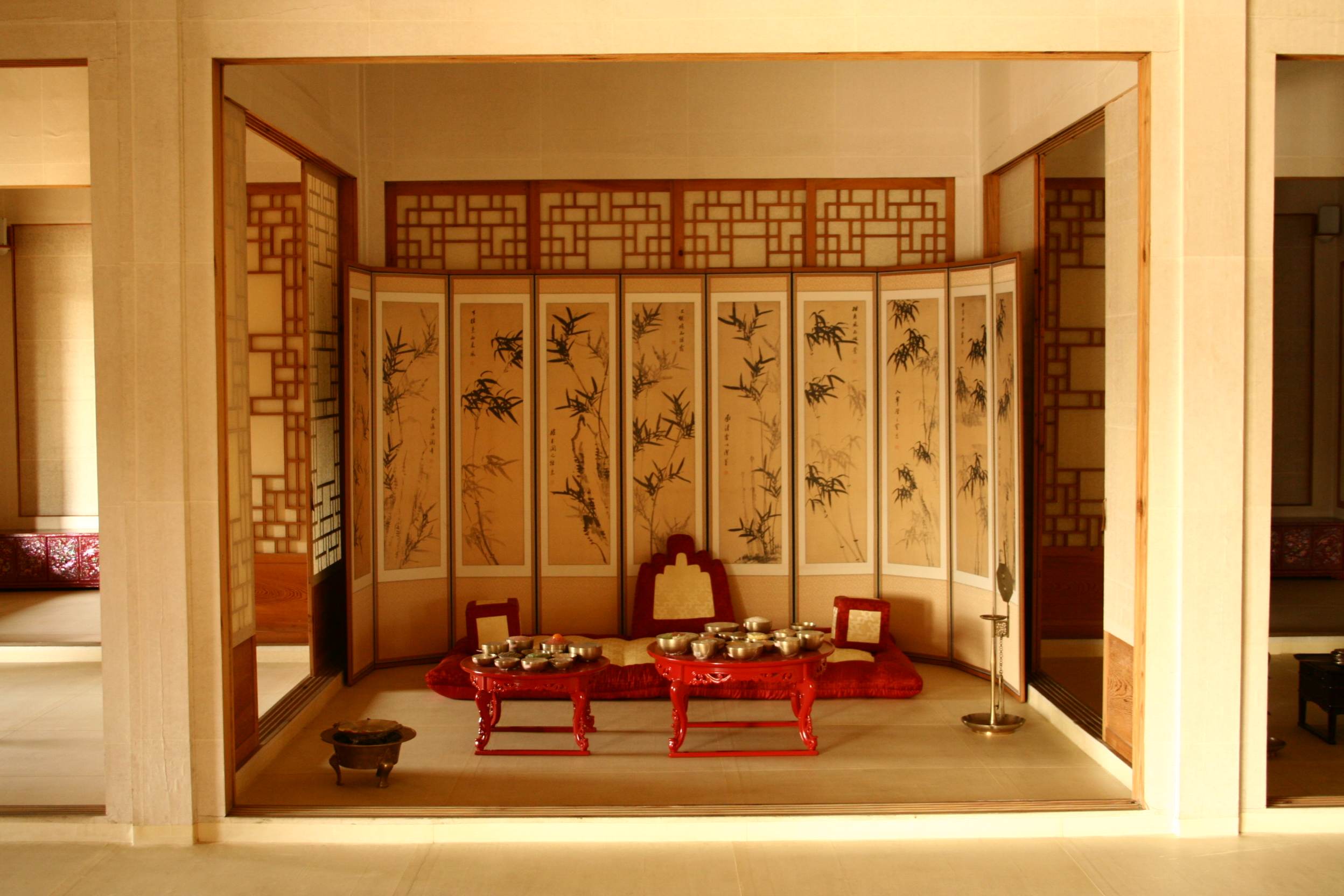

Korean name
- Hangul: 조선왕조 궁중요리
- Hanja: 朝鮮王朝宮中料理
- RR: Joseon wangjo gungjung yori
- MR: Chosŏn wangjo kungjung yori

Korean royal court cuisine was the style of cookery within Korean cuisine traditionally consumed at the court of the Joseon Dynasty, which ruled Korea from 1392 to 1897. There has been a revival of this cookery style in the 21st century. It is said that twelve dishes should be served along with rice and soup, with most dishes served in bangjja (bronzeware).

== History ==
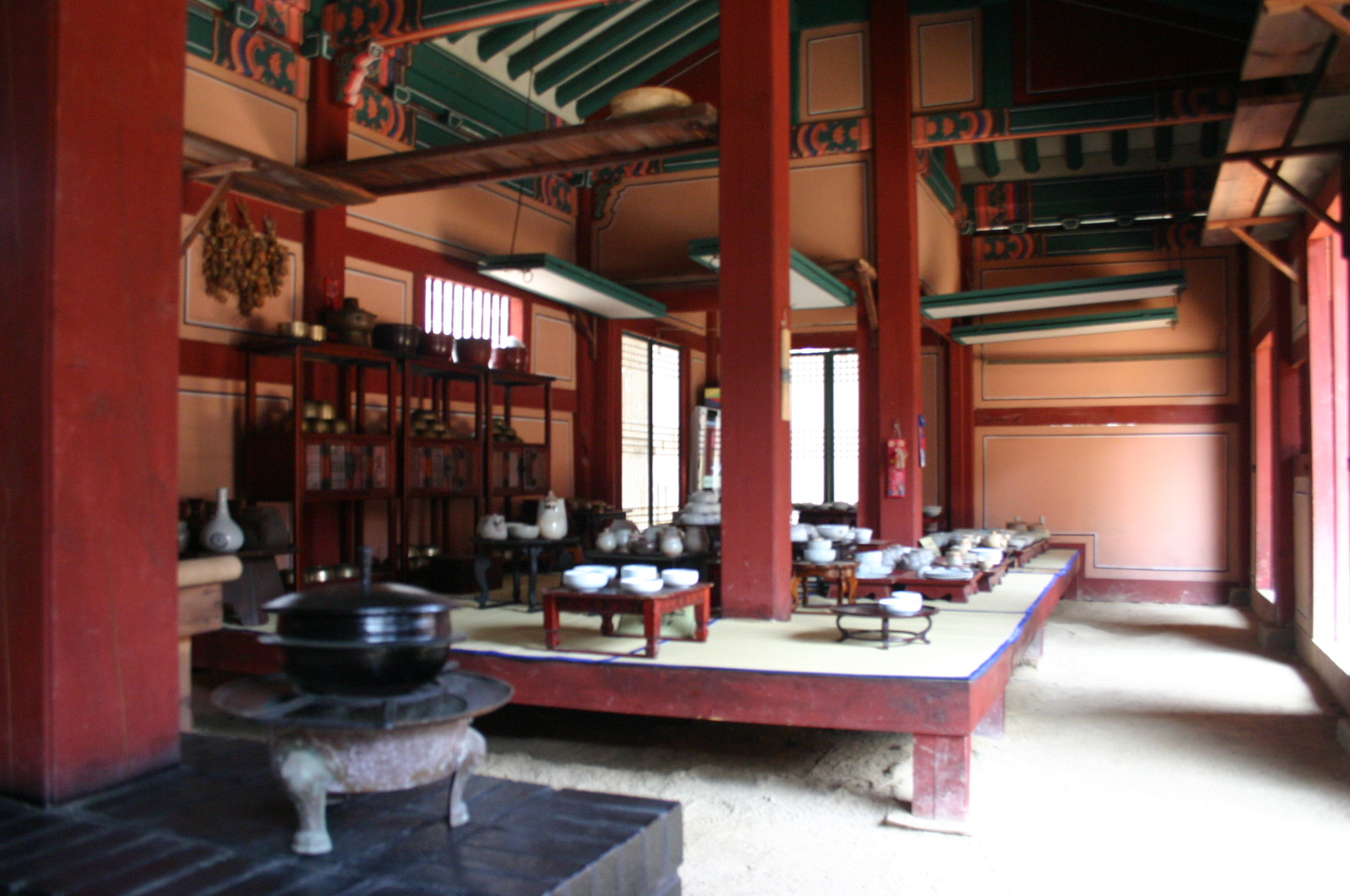
A recreation of a royal kitchen in which kungnyŏ (court ladies) worked, displayed in the Dae Jang Geum Theme Park

Collectively known as gungjung eumsik during the pre-modern era, the foods of the royal palace reflected the opulent nature of the past rulers of the Korean peninsula. The opulent nature of the royalty is evidenced in examples as far back as the Silla kingdom, where a man-made lake (Anapji Lake, located in Gyeongju) was created with multiple pavilions and halls for the sole purpose of opulent banquets and a spring-fed channel, Poseokjeong, was created for the singular purpose of setting wine cups afloat during the writing of poems.

Reflecting the regionalism of the kingdoms and bordering countries of the peninsula, the cuisine borrowed from each of these areas to function as a showcase. The royalty had the finest regional delicacies sent to the palace. Although there are records of banquets pre-dating the Joseon period, the majority of these records note a vast variety of foods without mentioning the specific foods present. The meals cooked for the royal family were not seasonal, like a commoner's meal. Instead, they varied significantly day to day. The eight provinces were represented each month in turn in the royal palace by ingredients presented by their governors. This gave the cooks a wide assortment of ingredients to use for royal meals.

Food held a very important place in Joseon period. Official positions were created within the Six Ministries (State Council, 육조) that were charged with all matters related to procurement and consumption of food and drink for the royal court. The Board of Personnel (Ijo, 이조) contained positions specific for attaining rice for the royal family. The Board of Rites (Yejo) were responsible for foods prepared for ancestor rites, attaining wines and other beverages, and medicinal foods. There were also hundreds of slaves and women who worked in the palace that had tasks such as making tofu, liquor, tea, and tteok (rice cakes). The women were the cooks to the royal palace and were of commoner or low-status families. These women would be split into specific skill sets or "bureaus" such as the Bureau of special foods (Saenggwa-bang, 생과방) or the Bureau of cooking foods (Soju-bang, 소주방). These female cooks may have been assisted by male cooks from outside the palace during larger banquets when necessary.

Five meals were generally served in the royal palace each day during the Joseon period, and records suggest this pattern had existed from antiquity. Three of these meals would be full-course meals, while the afternoon and after dinner meals would consist of lighter fare. The first meal, mieumsang (미음상), was served at sunrise on days when the king and queen were not taking herbal medicines. The meal consisted of rice porridge (juk, 죽) made with ingredients such as abalone (jeonbokjuk), white rice (huinjuk), mushrooms (beoseotjuk), pine nuts (jatjuk), and sesame (kkaejuk). The side dishes could consist of kimchi, nabak kimchi, oysters, soy sauce, and other items. The porridge was thought to give vitality to the king and queen throughout the day.

The sura (수라) were the main meals of the day. Breakfast was served at ten in the morning and the evening meals were served between six and seven at night. The set of three tables (surasang, 수라상), were usually set with two types of rice, two types of soup, two types of stew (jjigae), one dish of jjim (meat stew), one dish of jeongol (a casserole of meat and vegetables), three types of kimchi, three types of jang (장) and twelve side dishes, or called 12 cheop (12첩). The meals were set in the surakan (수라간), a room specifically used for taking meals, with the king seated to the east and the queen to the west. Each had their own set of tables and were attended by three palace servant women known as sura sanggung (수라상궁). These women would remove bowl covers and offer the foods to the king and queen after ensuring that the dishes were not poisoned.

This Korean food heritage has been inscribed by the government as Important Intangible Cultural Property No. 38. Han Bok-ryeo (한복려; 韓福麗) is the current Living National Treasure as the keeper of this property.

== Surasang setting ==
Surasang setting

The surasang should be served with three tables and a hotpot. The largest round table on the left is the main table which contains main bowl, soups and stews, dishes, side dishes and fermented stored dishes. The small round table at the lower right corner contains red sura, gomtang or thick meat broth, dessert, tea, empty dishes and bowls. This table is also used to store the covers of bowls and dishes used in the main table. The rectangular table in the upper right corner contains eggs, sesame oil, various raw vegetables and several sauces. The hotpot in the middle right is heated with charcoal, and usually contains jeongol such as sinseollo.

The setting was as follows:

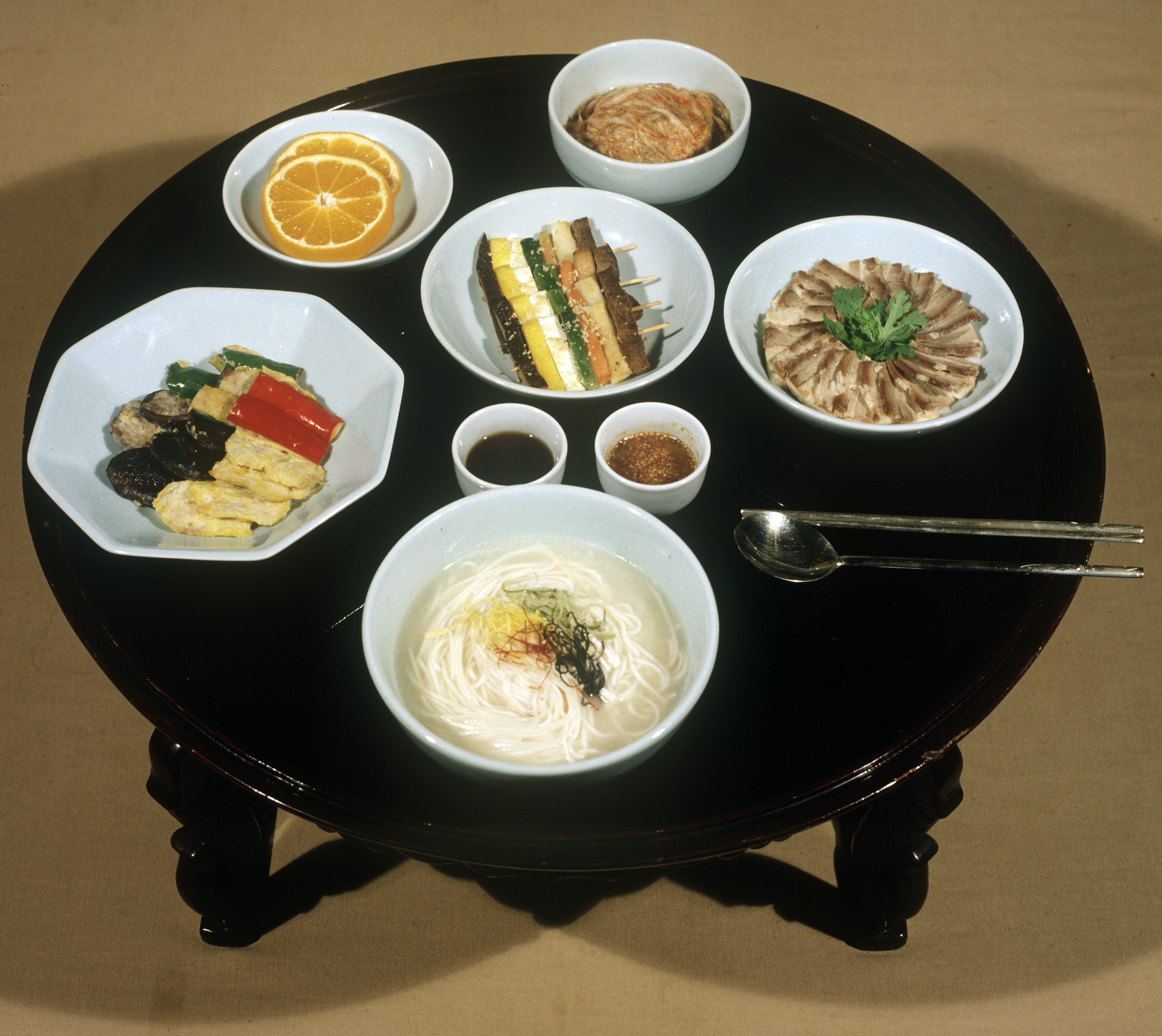
Korean royal court cuisine side table

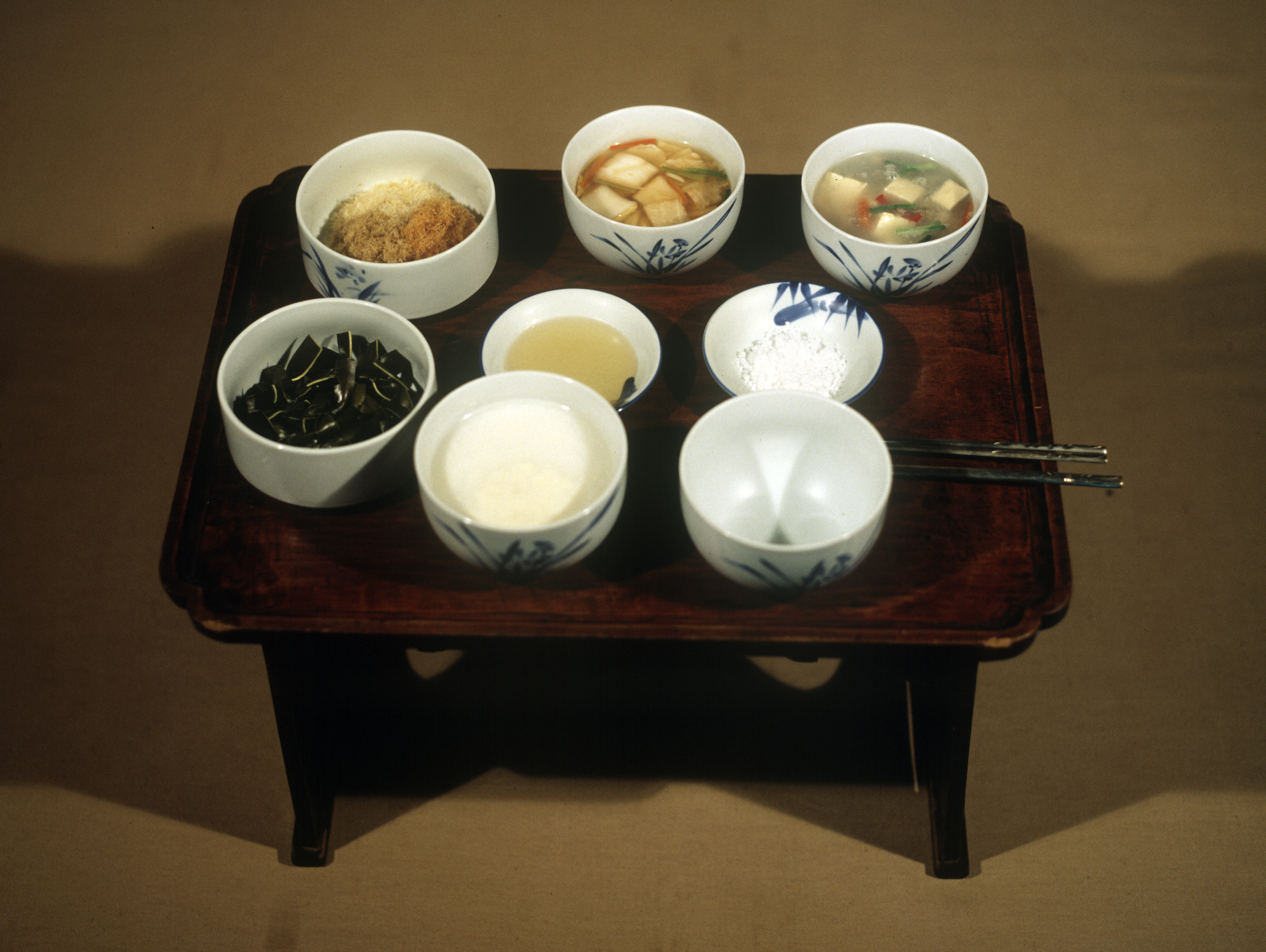
Korean royal court cuisine

A, B, C: surasanggung (수라상궁)

1. songsongi (송송이): cubed radish kimchi
2. jeotgugji (젓국지): kimchi from Korean cabbage seasoned with jeotgal
3. dongchimi (동치미): white kimchi
4. jeotgal (젓갈): fermented, salted seafood
5. jorigae (조리개): hard-boiled food with heavy seasonings
6. namul (나물): seasoned vegetable side dishes
7. saengche (생채): fresh salad
8. jjim (찜): steamed or boiled dishes
9. mareunchan (마른찬): dried foods
10. janggwa (장과): braised seafood
11. pyeonyuk (편육): boiled and seasoned meat pressed by heavy weight and then sliced thinly
12. changui (찬구이): fried Codonopsis lanceolata (더덕, deodeok) and kim
13. jeonyuhwa (전유화): pancake-like fried dish
14. Jeotguk jochi (젓국 조치): kind of fish soup
15. togu (토구): a plate used to hold bones during the meal
16. jang (장): soy sauce
17. chojang (초장): soy sauce with vinegar
18. cho gochujang (초 고추장): chili paste with vinegar
19. tojang jochi (토장 조치): soybean soup
20. huinsura (흰수라): white rice
21. gwaktang (곽탕): seaweed soup
22. chaeso (채소): vegetables
23. gogi (고기): meat
24. jangguk (장국): soybean paste soup
25. dalgyal (달걀): egg
26. jeongol (전골): type of stew
27. jaengban (쟁반) and chasu (차수): teapot and plate
28. gongjeobsi(공접시): empty plate
29. gonggi (공기): empty bowl
30. suran (수란): poached egg
31. hoe (회): raw fish and meat
32. deoungui (더운구이): hot grilled meat
33. hongban (홍반) or patsura (팥수라): rice with azuki beans
34. gomtang (곰탕): soup from beef meat and bones

== Main dishes served in a bowl ==
=== Sura ===
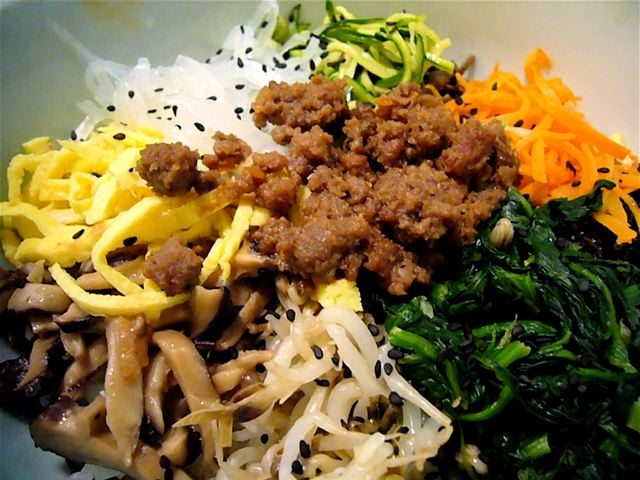
Closeup of the ingredients in goldongban or bibimbap

Sura (수라) is a bowl of boiled rice and grains. Two kinds of sura must always be served. This includes white sura.

- White sura (흰수라): boiled rice without any additional ingredients.
- Red sura (홍반): boiled rice made with the boiled water of azuki beans.
- Five-grain sura (오곡수라): made by boiling rice, sweet rice, glutinous millet, and azuki beans
- Goldongban (골동반): boiled rice mixed with steamed vegetables, roasted beef, and a fried egg. In the royal palace, bibimbap was known as goldongban.

=== Juk, mieum, and eungi ===
Juk (죽) and mieum (미음) or eung-i (응이) are types of rice porridge usually served in the morning. Juk is thicker than mieum in texture, the latter of which is similar to the Western gruel.

- Omija eungi (오미자응이): Omija berries are boiled and honey is then added to the boiled omija. The boiled omija berries are taken out. Mung bean starch is then added and the liquid is boiled again.
- Sok mieum (속미음): Sweet rice, red jujubes, ginseng root, and chestnuts are simmered.
- Jatjuk : Rice is soaked and pine nuts are ground before being boiled in water.
- Hangin juk (행인죽): Apricot kernels are peeled and ground with rice. The rice and apricot seed mixture is boiled.
- Heukimjajuk (흑임자죽): Black sesame seeds are ground and boiled with rice.
- Tarakjuk (타락죽): Soaked rice is boiled with water, and then cow milk is added. It is then boiled some more.
- Janggukjuk (장국죽): Ground beef and chopped shiitake mushrooms are boiled together.
- Other dishes include dalgyal samhap mieum, jo mieum, sok mieum, chajo mieum, yulmu eungi, nokmal eungi, and omija eungi.

=== Guksu ===
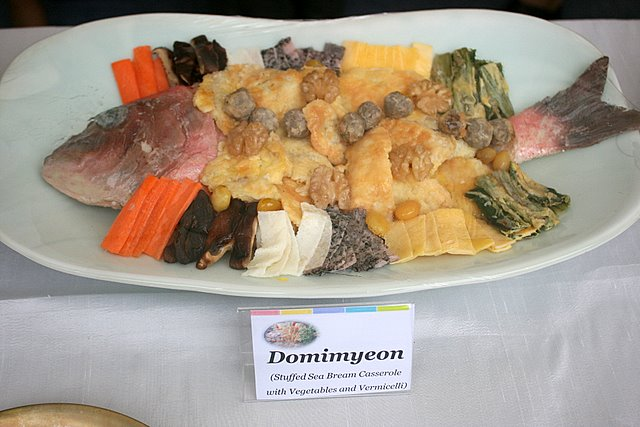
Domimyeon, stuffed sea bream casserole with vegetables and vermicelli

Guksu (국수) are noodles that are prepared with buckwheat or wheat flour, with the former being preferred.

- Myeon sinseollo (면신선로): Boiled sliced beef shank, paeju (패주), Korean parsley, and sliced bamboo sprouts are boiled with beef stock. Boiled guksu is added to the ready beef stock mixture.
- Onmyeon (온면): Stock made from beef brisket is added to roast beef, sliced egg pancake, and guksu.
- Nanmyeon (난면): Wheat flour is mixed with eggs to make noodles. They are then served with beef stock.
- Domimyeon (도미면): Noodle soup made with panfish, sliced egg pancakes, ginkgo seeds, walnuts, fried meatballs, and pine nuts.
- Other guksu dishes include jangguk naengmyeon, kimchiguk naengmyung, and bibim naengmyeon. Simple naengmyeon is also popular.

=== Mandu and ddeokguk ===
Mandu (만두) are boiled or steamed dumplings. Mandu dough is made from either wheat flour or buckwheat. The dough is then stuffed with various fillings. Tteokguk (떡국) is a soup made of tteok (glutinous rice cakes).

- Jangguk mandu (장국만두): Kimchi, pork, and tofu are used as filling.
- Saengchi mandu (생치만두): Ringneck pheasant, dropwort, cabbage, and shiitake mushrooms are used as filling. Buckwheat dough is used. The prepared saengchi mandu is then boiled in meat stock.
- Donga mandu (동아만두): Mandu made with winter melon, chicken and starch. It is steamed and then boiled in meat stock.
- Pyeonsu (편수): Mandu made with beef, cucumber, green bean sprouts, shiitake mushrooms, and rock tripe.
- Tteokguk (떡국): Tteok sliced in rounds to resemble coins, and boiled with meat stock. It is served with egg pancake slices and roasted ground meat.
- Other varieties include gyuasang (규아상) and junchi mandu (만두).
- Eo mandu (어만두): Mandu made with thinly sliced fish flesh as its wrap and stuffed with minced beef, vegetables, and several spices.

== Dishes ==
=== Tang ===
Tang is a type of soup made with beef shank, intestines, a knuckle (bone) and beef brisket.

- Malgeun guk (맑은 국): a hot and clear soup, and includes Mu-guk (무국), clear beef soup, Miyeok guk, dried pollock soup, etc.
- Gomguk: a thick soup made so by simmering for a long time. Varieties include gomtang (곰탕), seolleongtang (설렁탕), yukgaejang (육개장), etc.
- Tojangguk (토장국): a soup flavored with doenjang (fermented soybean paste). This includes cabbage tonjangguk, spinach tojangguk, etc.
- Naengguk : a soup served cold. This includes kkaeguktang, oinaengguk, and wakame cold soup.

=== Jochi and gamjeong ===
Jochi (조치) and gamjeong (감정) are stew-like dishes which are now called jjigae. If seasoned with gochujang, they are called gamjeong. Jochi is seasoned with salt or salted shrimp. Other varieties include:

- Crab gamjeong
- Cucumber gamjeong
- Oyster jochi
- Zucchini jochi
- Fish jochi

=== Jjim and seon ===
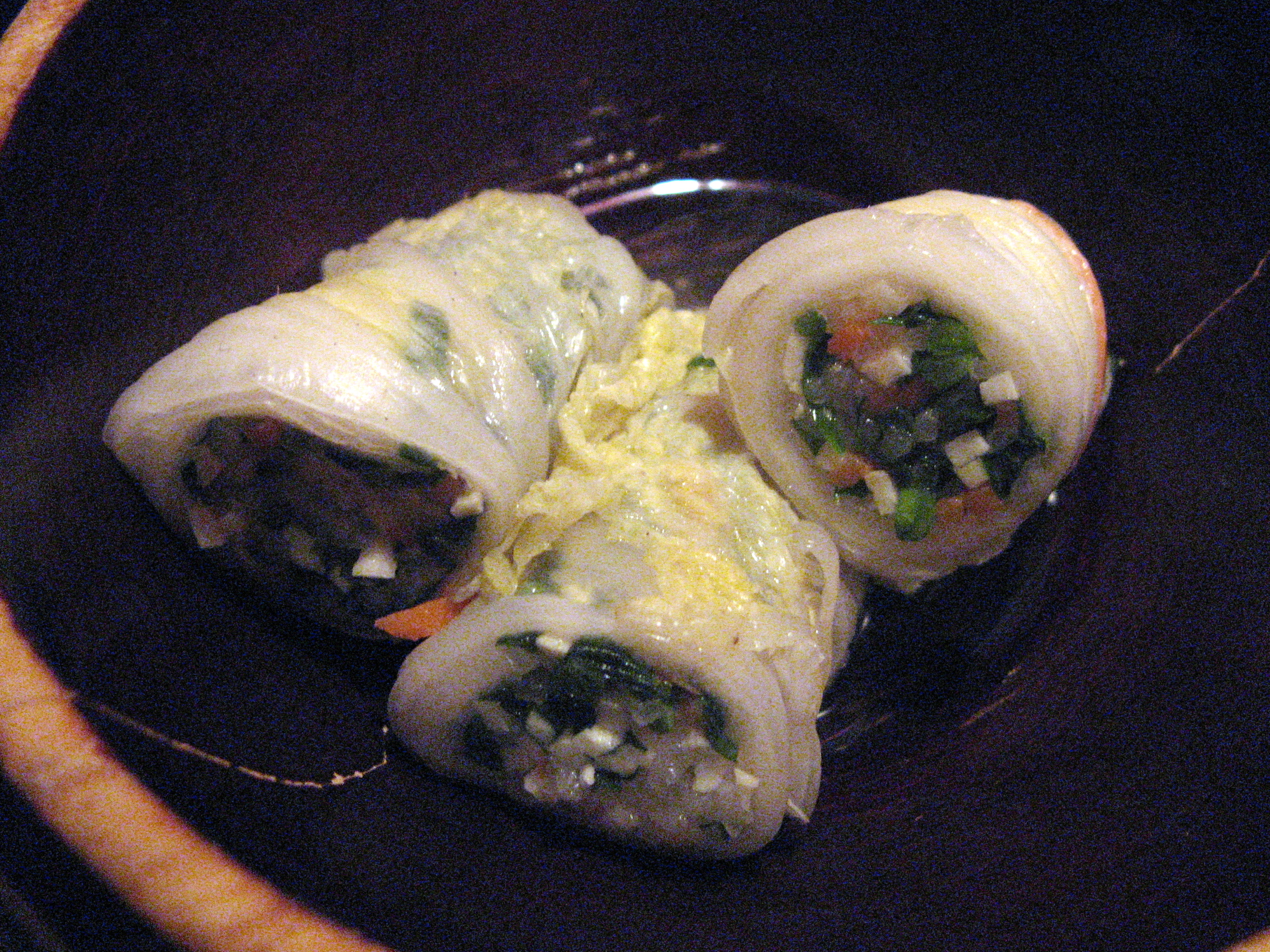
Baechuseon, steamed and stuffed bachu (napa cabbage) roll

Jjim (찜): steamed or boiled beef, pork, and fish seasoned with vegetables. Seon (선) is steamed vegetables, tofu, and fish stuffed with fillings made with beef or chicken and onions.

- Swellfish jjim
- Bure jjim (부레찜)
- Red sea bream jjim or Pagrus major jjim
- Tteok
- Ox tail jjim
- Dubuseon (두부선), steamed tofu with fillings
- Gajiseon (가지선), made with eggplant
- Oiseon (오이선), made with cucumber
- Hobakseon (호박선), made with zucchini
- Museon (무선), made with radish
- Baechuseon (배추선), made with napa cabbage

== Jeongol and sinseollo ==
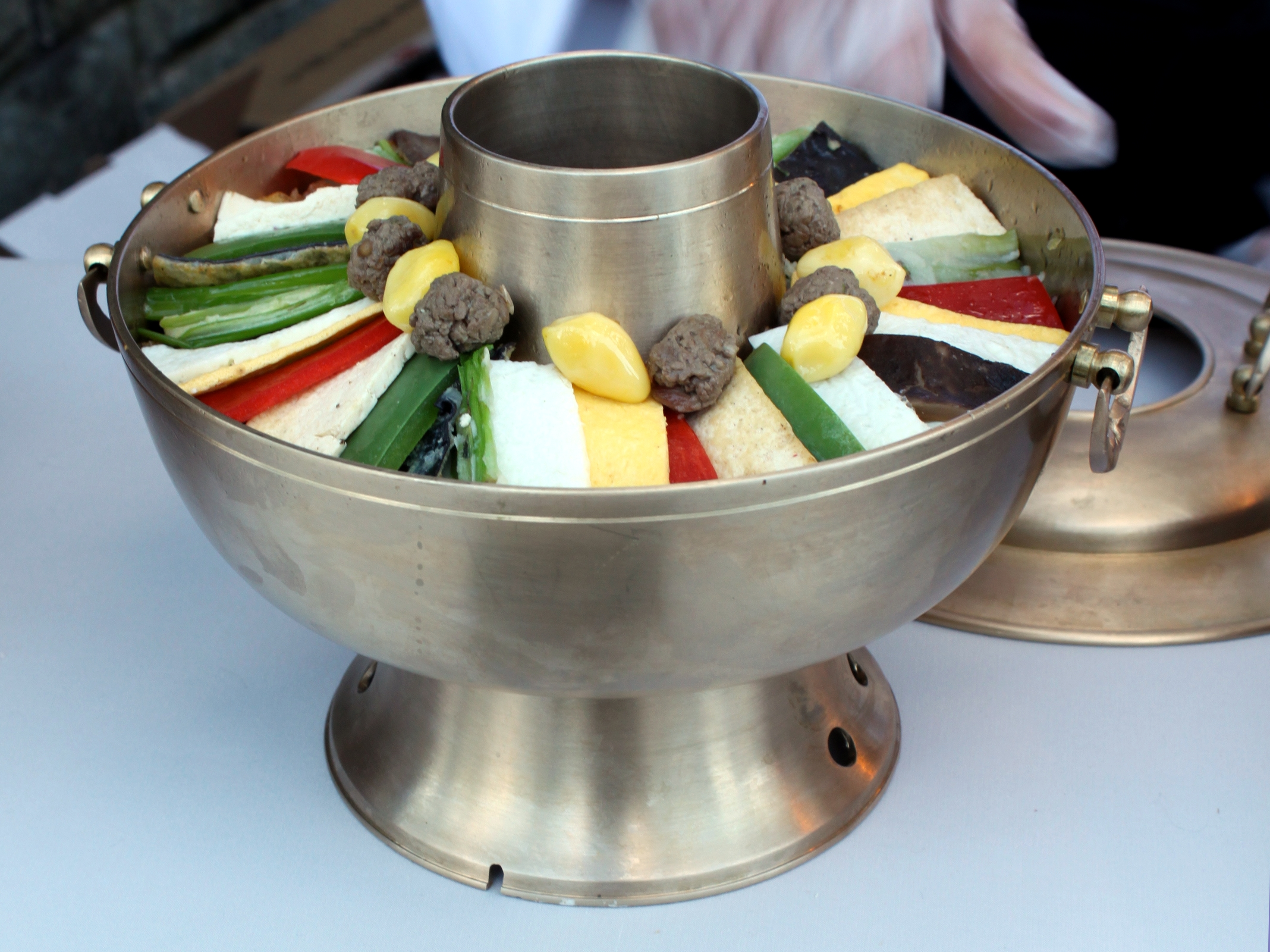
Sinseollo

Jeongol and sinseollo are similar to Western stew or Chinese hotpot. Sinseollo (which is a variety of jeongol) is boiled in meat stock with various vegetables and mushrooms in a specific cooking pot with holes. Jeongol and sinseollo are served with a burner.

- Domi guksu jeongol, made with noodles and Red seabream
- Nakji jeongol, made with small octopus
- Dubu jeongol, made with tofu

== Side dishes ==
=== Saengchae ===
Saengchae (생채) is like a salad seasoned with salt, vinegar, soy sauce, or mustard sauce.

- Mu saengchae, made of shredded radish
- Oi saengchae, made of cucumber
- Deodeok saengchae, made of deodeok root (Codonopsis lanceolata, a species of bonnet bellflower).
- Seomchorongkkot saengchae, made of Korean bellflower, etc.

=== Namul ===
Namul (나물) are any variety of steamed vegetables seasoned with hot pepper, garlic, green onion, salt, and sesame or perilla oil. Typical vegetables include spinach, radish, royal fern, bracken, zucchini, green bean sprouts, Korean bellflower, bamboo shoots, etc. In some cases, dangmyeon (potato starch noodles) and roasted beef can be used as well.

- Gujeolpan
- Japchae
- Tangpyeonchae

=== Jorigae ===
Jorigae (조리개) hard-boiled foods with heavy seasonings. Meats, fish and vegetable are mainly used.

- Beef jorigae (우육조리개)
- Sliced steamed beef jorigae (우편육조리개)
- Sliced steamed pork jorigae (돈편육조리개)
- Small yellow croaker jorigae (조기조리개)

=== Jeonyuhwa ===
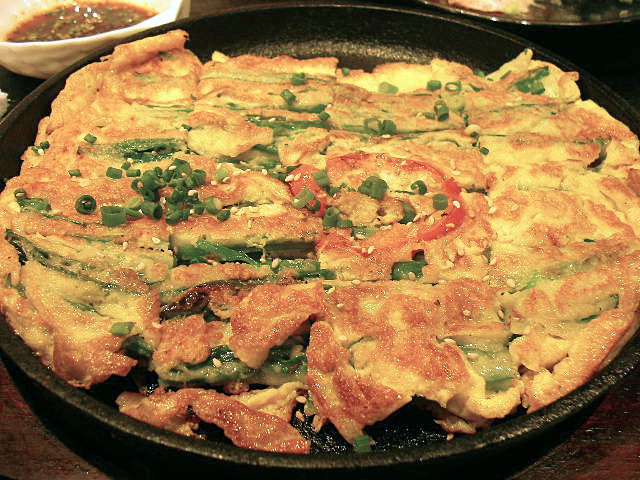
Bindaetteok

Jeonyuhwa (전유화) or sometimes jeon: a dish resembling a pancake. The main ingredients can be lightly battered with egg and wheat flour. Eggs, flour, and other ingredients can be mixed to make pancakes.

- Jogaejeon, made with shellfish
- Saeu jeon, made with shrimp
- Gochu jeon, made with hot pepper
- Bindaetteok (빈대떡) made from ground mung beans and other ingredients
- Yeongeun jeon, made with sliced lotus root
- Pajeon, made with green onions

=== Gui ===
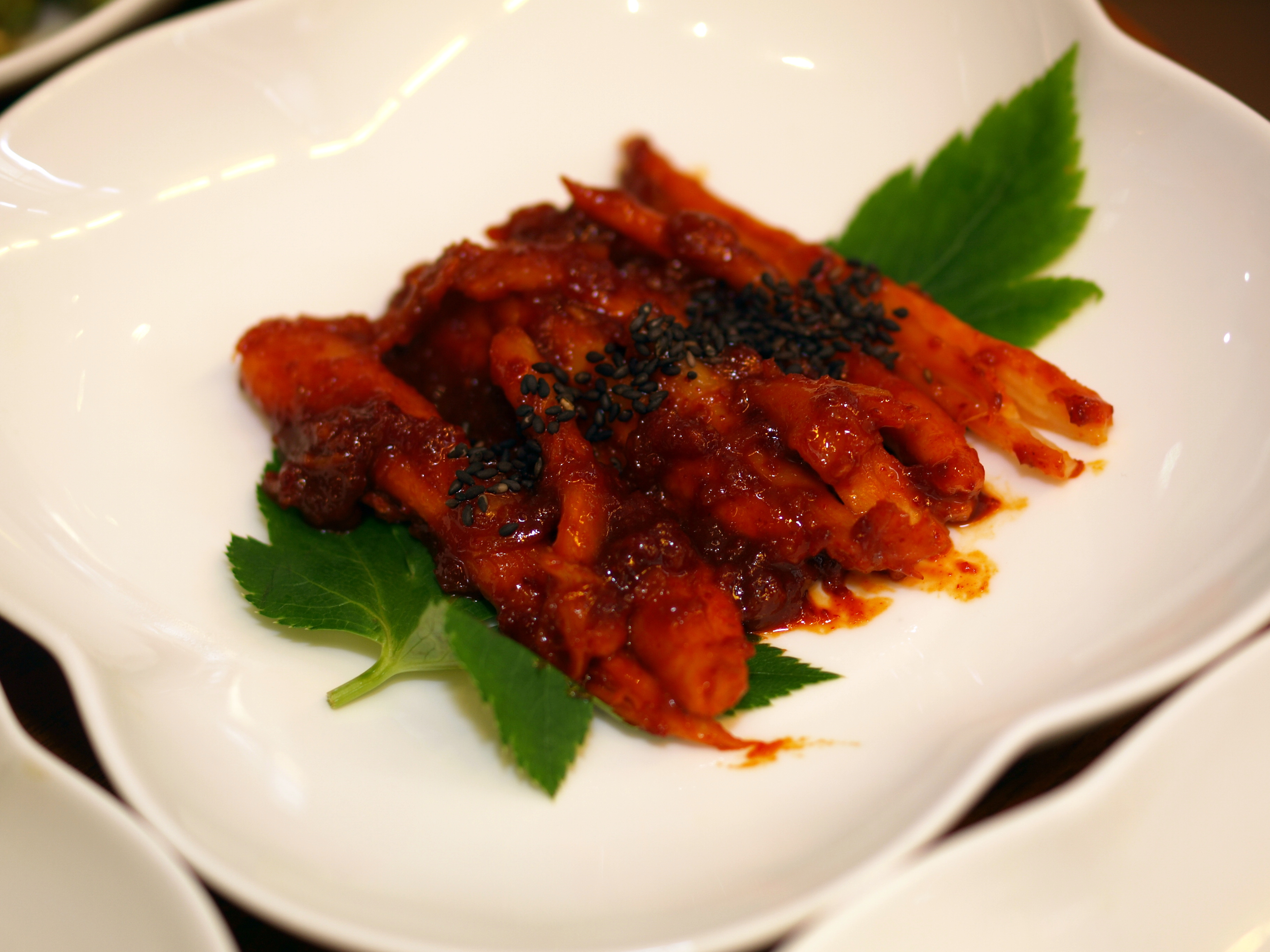
Deodeok gui

Gui is a generic Korean cuisine term for roasted and seasoned dishes. The main ingredients include green laver, beef, the root of deodeok (Codonopsis lanceolata; 더덕), fish, mushrooms, vegetables, Aralia elata sprouts (두릅), etc.

- Garibi gui (가리비구이) or gari gui (가리구리), old term for galbi, grilled short ribs seasoned with soy sauce
- Garibi gui (가리비구이), grilled scallops
- Neobiani (너비아니), ancient form of bulgogi
- Pogui (포구이), grilled po (either dried meat jerky, or fish)
- Dak sanjeok (닭산적), grilled chicken and vegetables on skewers
- Hwayang seok (화양적), various marinated ingredients grilled on skewers

=== Hoe (hweh) ===
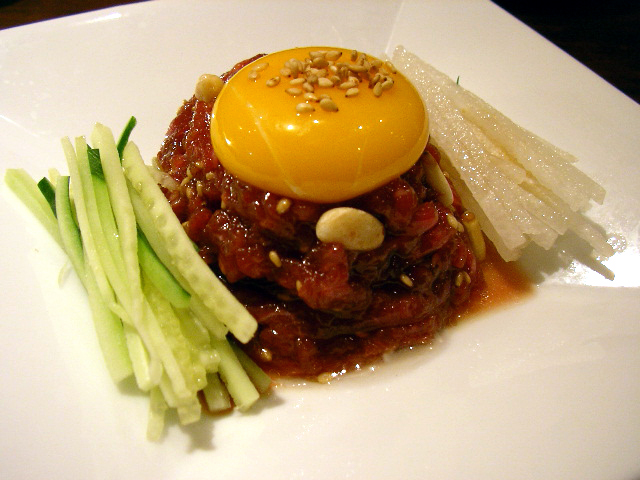
Yukhoe (육회; 肉膾)

Hoe (회) is raw fish or raw seasoned beef

- Yukhoe, raw seasoned beef
- Gaksaek hoe (각색회)
- Gabhoe (갑회), etc.

=== Jang (장류) ===
- sauce
  - Doenjang : soybean paste like miso, but containing some whole and partially crushed beans, fermented in crocks until very mellow
  - Cheonggukjang : more pungent soybean paste, fermented for only a few days. Contains some whole or partially crushed soybeans.
  - Cheongjang (청장): "bright" sauce (soy sauce with vinegar)
  - Gochujang: hot pepper soybean paste sauce
  - Chogochujang (초고추장): vinegar hot pepper soybean paste sauce
  - Gyeojajeub (겨자즙): mustard sauce

=== Banchan (반찬) ===
- dishes
  - Changui (찬구이): cold roast of laver and Codonopsis lanceolata root, a bonnet bellflower species called deodeok (더덕) in Korean
  - Deoungui (더운구이): hot roast of meat, fish, etc.
  - Jeonyuhwa (전유화): pancake of meat, fish, and vegetables
  - Pyeonyuk (편육): steamed meat
  - Sukchae (숙채): steamed vegetables
  - Saengchae (생채): raw seasoned vegetables
  - Jorim: lightly boiled meat, fish and vegetables with seasoning
  - Janggwa (장과): fermented vegetables in soy sauce
  - Jeotgal: fermented salty fish
  - Mareulchan (마른찬): dried slices of meat seasoned with spices, fried kelp, and dried salty fish
  - Hoe (회): raw fish or beef, or fermented raw fish
  - Chansuran (찬수란): cold soup with vegetables or boiled meat
  - Chasu (차수): tea made from grains

== Dessert ==
- Tteok (rice cake)

Mostly made of rice, it is eaten as a dessert or on Chuseok, which falls on the 15th day of the 8th month in the Korean calendar (lunisolar). These rice cakes vary from containing sweet red bean rice to sesame seeds. Most of these rice cakes are mildly sweet and are enjoyed by everyone from young to old.

== Tea and fruit punch ==
- Sikhye:

A sweet rice punch. Being an iconic Korean traditional drink, several varieties of canned sikhye are now widely available.

- Sujeonggwa:

A sweet drink flavored with ginger and cinnamon. Softened dried persimmons and pine nuts are added at serving time.

- Fruit Hwachae: fruit punch made by mixing several fruits together, or only one fruit used. The ingredients are cherries, strawberries, peaches, or watermelons. There are also hwachae with floating azalea petals, boiled barley, pine pollen, or slices of pear in omija-flavored water, sweetened with honey or sugar.

== See also ==
- Hanjeongsik
- Dae Jang Geum
