= Juk (Korean food) =

Korean porridge dish

Juk (Korean)
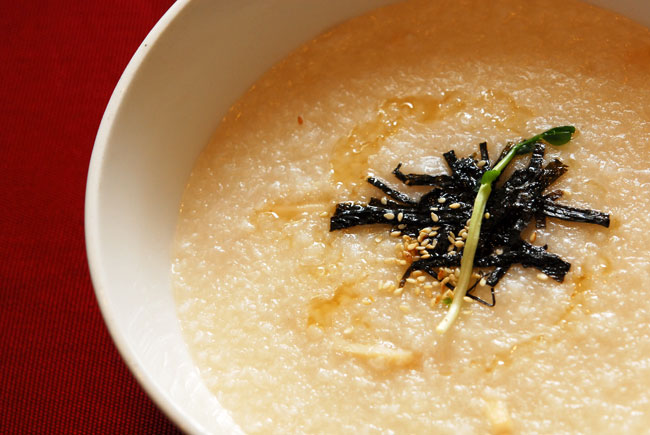
- Jeonbok-juk (abalone porridge)
- Type: Porridge
- Place of origin: Korea
- Main ingredients: Rice

Korean name
- Hangul: 죽
- Hanja: 粥
- RR: juk
- MR: chuk
- IPA: [tɕuk̚]

Juk (죽; 粥; [tɕuk̚]) is a Korean porridge dish that is made by boiling rice or other grains or legumes, such as beans, sesame, nuts, and pumpkin. Juk is often eaten warm, especially as a morning meal, but can also be eaten at any time of the day.

Depending on the ingredients and consistency, juk can be considered as food for recuperation, a delicacy, or famine food. It is known to have nutritional benefits, and is considered to be beneficial to digestion because of its soft texture. It is a staple "get well" dish; a dish to eat when one is sick or recovering from bad health. Juk is also considered an ideal food for babies, the ill or elderly, as it is easily eaten and digested. It is also sold commercially by many chain stores in South Korea, and is a common takeout dish.

The most basic form of juk is made from plain rice and water, and is called ssaljuk (쌀죽; 'rice porridge') or huinjuk (흰죽; 'white porridge'). Being largely unflavored, it is served with a number of more flavorful side dishes, such as jeotgal (salted seafood) and various types of kimchi.

There are more than forty varieties of juk mentioned in historical documents. Notable varieties include jatjuk made from finely ground pine nuts, jeonbok-juk made with abalones, yulmu-juk made from Job's tears (Coix lacryma-jobi var. ma-yuen), and patjuk made from red beans.

== Varieties ==
=== Daechu-gom ===
Daechu-gom (Korean: 대추곰; pronounced [tɛ.tɕʰu.ɡom]) features jujubes and is made with glutinous rice flour, walnuts, and pine nuts, and served warm. Washed and dried jujubes are boiled in water, strained, and sieved to remove the seeds. Sieved jujube is then boiled, with glutinous rice flour slurry added a little at a time while simmering. The dish is seasoned with salt and garnished with chopped walnuts and whole pine nuts.

=== Dakjuk ===
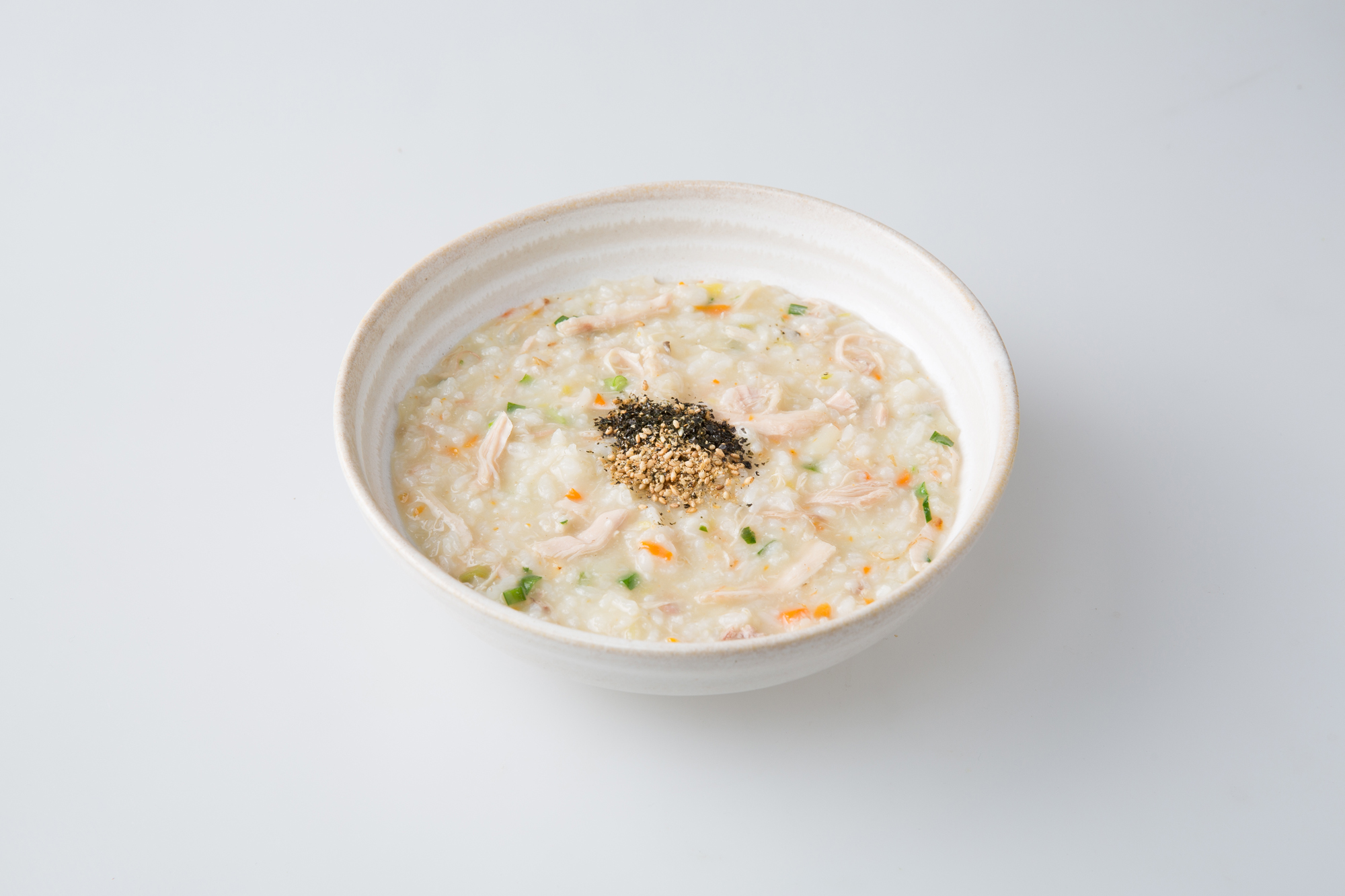
Dakjuk (chicken porridge)

Dakjuk (Korean: 닭죽; Hanja: 닭粥; lit. 'chicken porridge') is a variation made with chicken. The primary ingredients are rice, chicken, garlic, and green onions. While Korean food is often spicy, dakjuk is not, making it easy to digest. Medical patients and children often eat dakjuk in Korea. These days, dakjuk has become more popular for its high nutritional value, so people can try it in many restaurants specializing in juk in Korea.

=== Euneo-juk ===
Euneo-juk (Korean: 은어죽; Hanja: 銀魚粥; pronounced [ɯ.nʌ.dʑuk̚]) or sweetfish porridge is made with sweetfish and rice. Preparation of the soup usually involves boiling sweetfish to make stock, deboning the boiled fish for inclusion in the porridge, and boiling soaked rice in the stock.

In South Jeolla Province, the porridge is made with glutinous rice, fresh ginseng, chestnuts, and jujubes. The soup is usually seasoned with minced garlic, grated ginger, salt, and sesame oil.

In North Gyeongsang Province, sweetfish stock is first seasoned with doenjang (soybean paste) and gochujang (chili paste). Aromatics are added to the soaked rice (usually chopped scallions, minced garlic, and grated ginger), followed by sujebi (torn wheat flour dough) and vegetables such as chili peppers, kkaennip (perilla leaves), waterdropwort, and crown daisy greens.

In South Gyeongsang Province, boned sweetfish is stir-fried in sesame oil. Finely diced onions and carrots are then added to the rice and stock. The porridge is seasoned with salt to finish.

=== Heugimja-juk ===
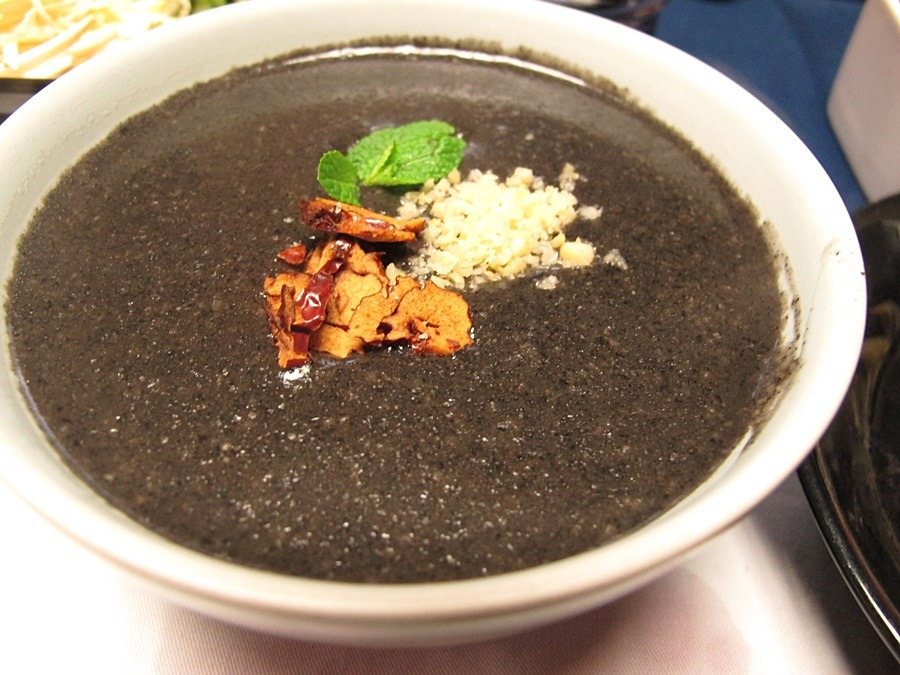
Heugimja-juk (black sesame porridge)

Heugimja-juk (Korean: 흑임자죽; Hanja: 黑荏子粥) or black sesame porridge is made from finely ground black sesame and rice. The bittersweet, nutty porridge is said to be good for recovering patients, as black sesame seeds are rich in digestive enzymes that help with healthy liver and kidney functions.

Preparation of heugimja-juk starts with washing, soaking, and draining black sesame and rice separately. Black sesame seeds are then toasted over low heat, and mixed with rice and water, to be ground in a millstone or blender. The ground mixture is sifted and simmered.

=== Hobak-juk ===
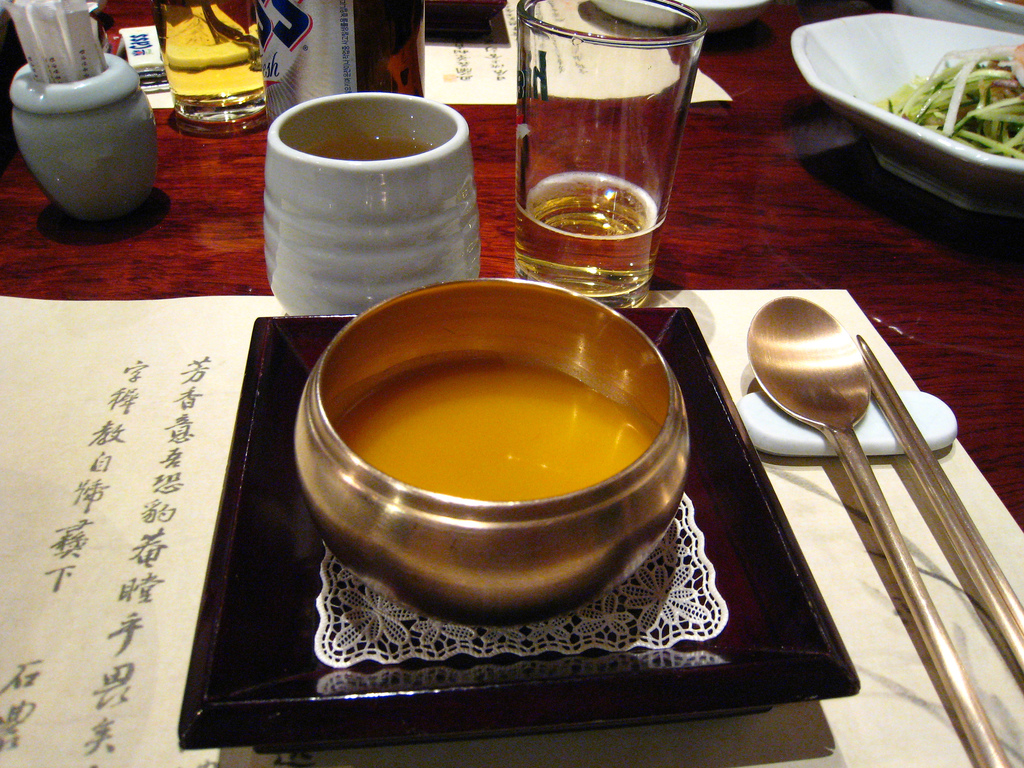
Hobak-juk served in a bangjja bowl

Hobak-juk (Korean: 호박죽; Hanja: 호박粥; pronounced [ho.bak̚.t͈ɕuk̚]) or pumpkin porridge, is a variety of Korean juk made with pumpkin and glutinous rice flour. Recovering patients or the elderly traditionally receive this smooth and naturally sweet porridge.

Korean cheese pumpkins called cheongdung-hobak (청둥호박) or kabocha squash called danhobak (단호박), are washed and sliced into three-to-five-centimetre-thick (1–2 in) pieces. It is boiled, peeled, deseeded, and mashed. Mashed pumpkin can be strained to obtain a smoother texture. It is then mixed with glutinous rice flour slurry and boiled, during which parboiled red beans or black beans may be added. Another common addition is saealsim (새알심; literally "bird's egg", named as such due to its resemblance to small bird's eggs, possibly quail eggs), the small rice cake balls made of glutinous rice flour kneaded with hot water. Finally, salt and, optionally, sugar are added to taste.

=== Jangguk-juk ===
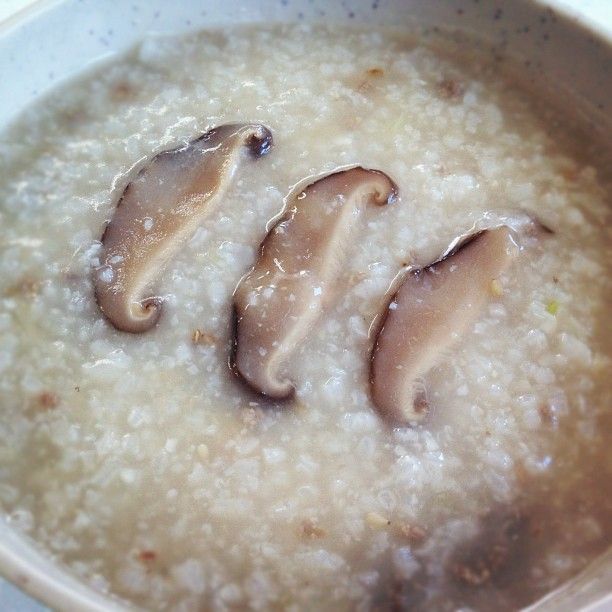
Jangguk-juk garnished with mushroom slices

Jangguk-juk (Korean: 장국죽; Hanja: 醬국粥; pronounced [tɕaŋ.k͈uk̚.t͈ɕuk̚]) is made by boiling rice in malgeun-jangguk (맑은장국), a soup soy sauce-based beef broth made with seasoned ground beef stir-fried in sesame oil. The porridge was historically referred to as uyuk-juk (우육죽; 牛肉粥; "beef porridge") in Jeungbo sallim gyeongje, a 1766 book.

To make jangguk, ground beef is seasoned with chopped scallions, minced garlic, soup soy sauce, sesame oil, and ground black pepper, then stir-fried in sesame oil. Water is added to the stir-fried beef and any foam or excess oil is skimmed. When the broth is fully flavored, soaked rice is added and boiled until the porridge reaches the desired consistency. Lean meat such as beef round is preferred, and the porridge should be mildly seasoned. It is good for recovering patients and the elderly.

=== Jatjuk ===
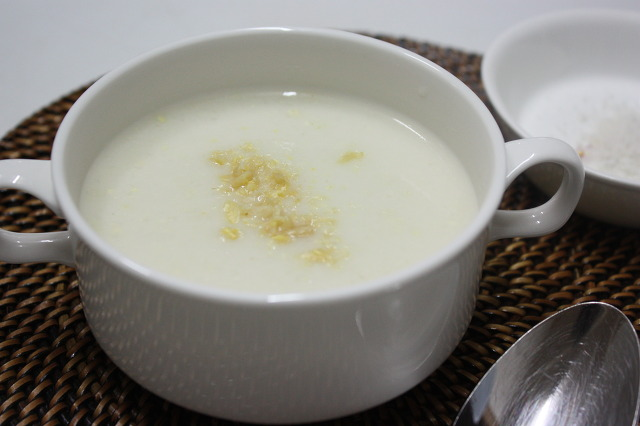
Jatjuk

Jatjuk (Korean: 잣죽; Hanja: 잣粥; pronounced [tɕat̚.t͈ɕuk̚]), or pine nut porridge, is a variety of juk made by boiling finely ground pine nuts and rice flour or soaked rice in water. It is a mild, nutritious, and easily digestible dish often served to recovering patients and the elderly.

The porridge is made with white rice and pine nuts, which are separately soaked, ground, and sieved. The ground rice is then boiled, with ground pine nuts added a little at a time while simmering. Grinding the ingredients together causes them to separate after boiling. The porridge is seasoned with salt and often garnished with whole or crushed pine nuts.

=== Jeonbok-juk ===
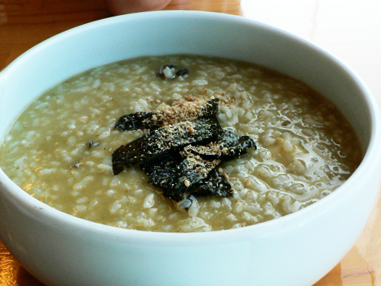
Jeonbokjuk including the abalone's internal organs.

Jeonbok-juk (Korean: 전복죽; Hanja: 全鰒粥; pronounced [tɕʌn.bok̚.t͈ɕuk̚]; lit. 'whole abalone juk') or abalone rice porridge, is made with abalone and white rice. Abalone is regarded as a high-quality ingredient in Korean cuisine and was often presented as a gift to the king of Korea. The dish is a local specialty of Jeju Island, where abalone are commonly harvested. Jeonbokjuk is known as not only a delicacy but also as a nutritional supplement and digestive aid, especially for ill patients or elderly people. Jeonbokjuk can be made with or without the abalone's internal organs. The former type of jeonbokjuk has a green tinge, while the latter is more ivory in color.

Abalone are first prepared by cleaning with a brush in water, and the flesh is taken out from the flat and middle of the shells with a small kitchen knife. The internal organs are removed separately from the flesh, taking care not to damage them. The flesh is slightly parboiled in a pot of boiling water and then thinly sliced. Rice is soaked in a bowl of water for 3 to 4 hours before cooking. The abalone flesh is stir-fried in a pot over a medium flame with sesame oil, with the soaked rice then added. After stir-frying for a while, water is poured into the pot, and the dish is cooked at a higher temperature. Constant stirring prevents the ingredients from sticking to the bottom of the pot. After the dish has come to a boil, the heat is lowered and allowed to simmer. The dish is seasoned with salt, or ganjang (Korean soy sauce).

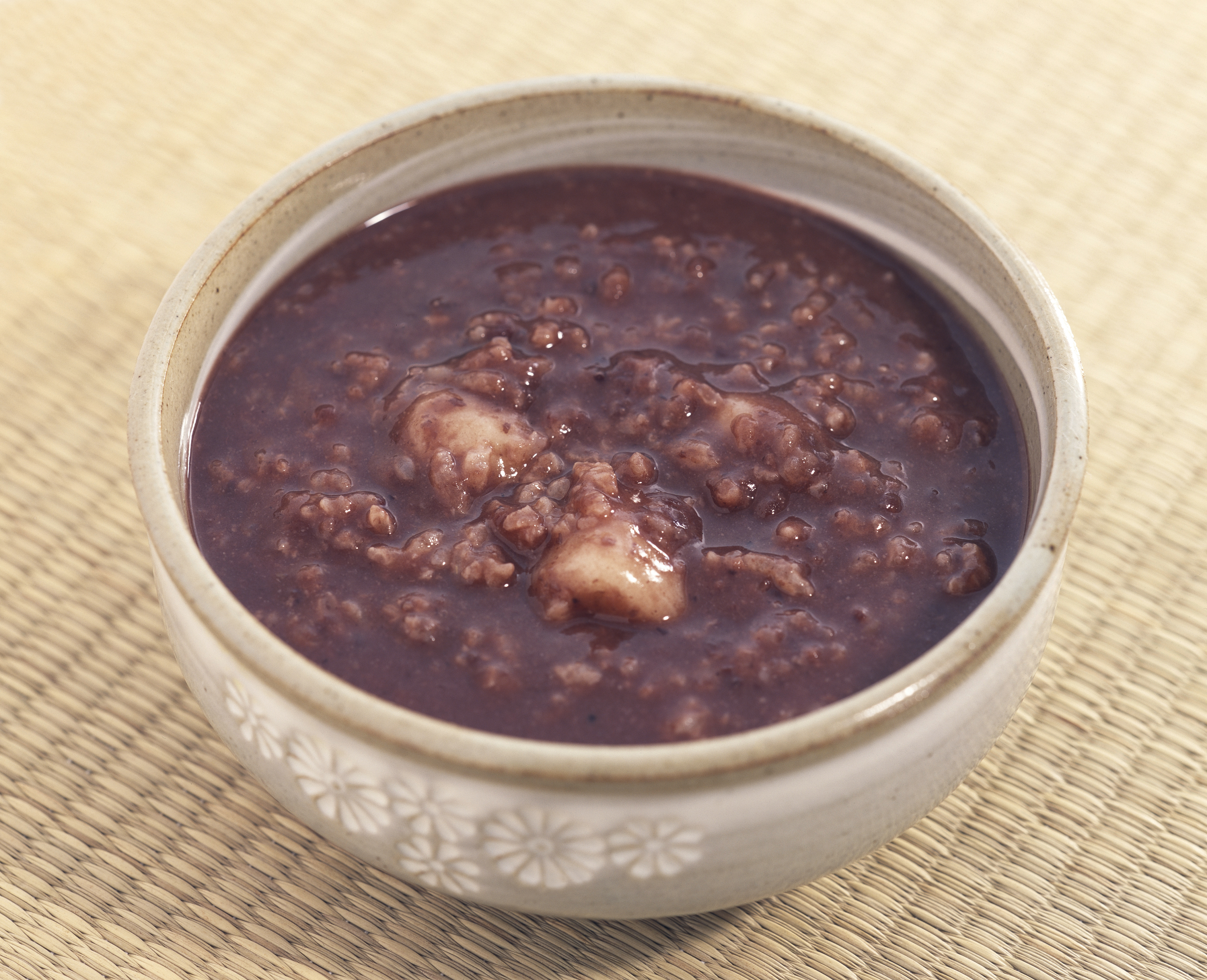
A bowl of patjuk with saealsim (rice cake balls)

=== Patjuk ===
Patjuk (Korean: 팥죽) is made with red beans and rice, commonly eaten during the winter, and is particularly associated with dongzhi, the winter solstice, as its red colour was believed to drive away evil spirits.

=== Tarak-juk ===
Tarak-juk (Korean: 타락죽; Hanja: 駝酪粥), also called uyu-juk (Korean: 우유죽; Hanja: 牛乳粥; lit. 'milk porridge'), is a juk made with milk and rice. Historically, it was a part of the Korean royal court cuisine.

== See also ==
- Bap
- Congee
- List of porridges
