= List of Seoul dishes =

This is a list of typical Seoul dishes found in Korean cuisine.

== Main dishes ==
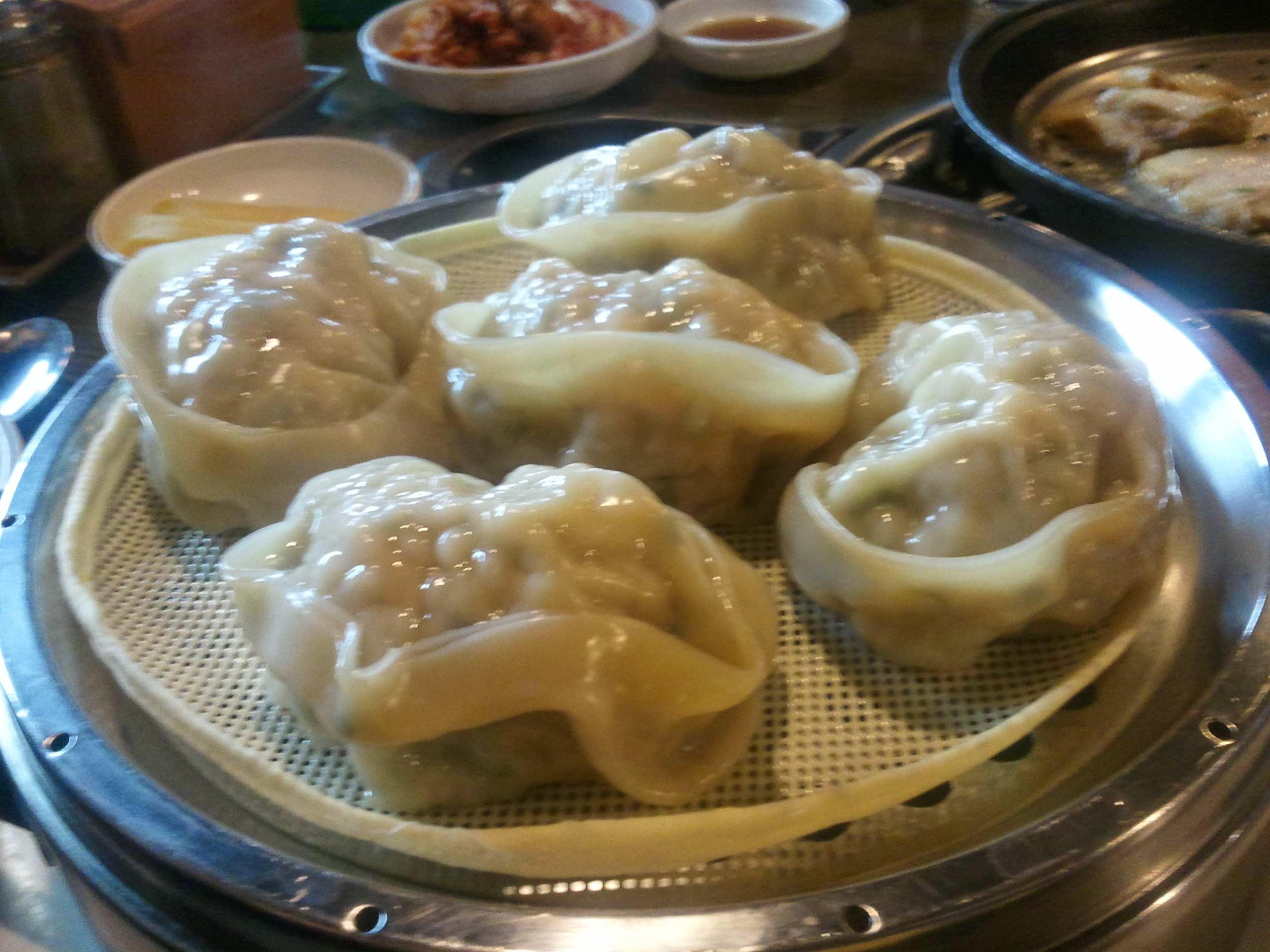
Mandu

- Gukbap, soup with rice
- Heukimjajuk, black sesame porridge
- Jatjuk, pine nut porridge
- Memil mandu, dumpling with a buckwheat covering
- Pyeonsu, square-shaped mandu (dumpling) with vegetable filling.
- Saengchi mandu, dumpling stuffed with pheasant meat
- Seolleongtang, beef soup with rice
- Tteokguk, rice cake soup

== Channyu (side dishes) ==
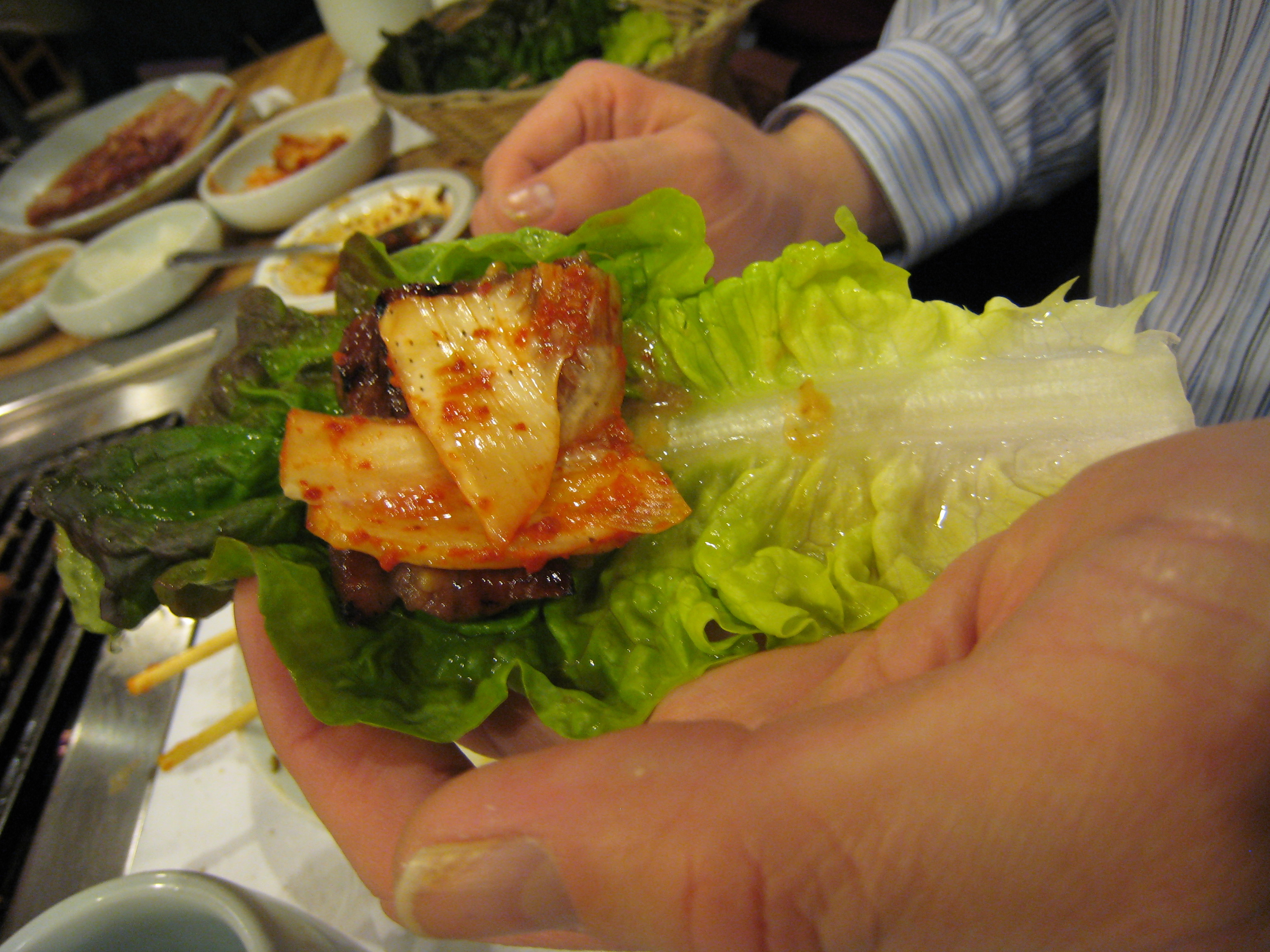
Ssam

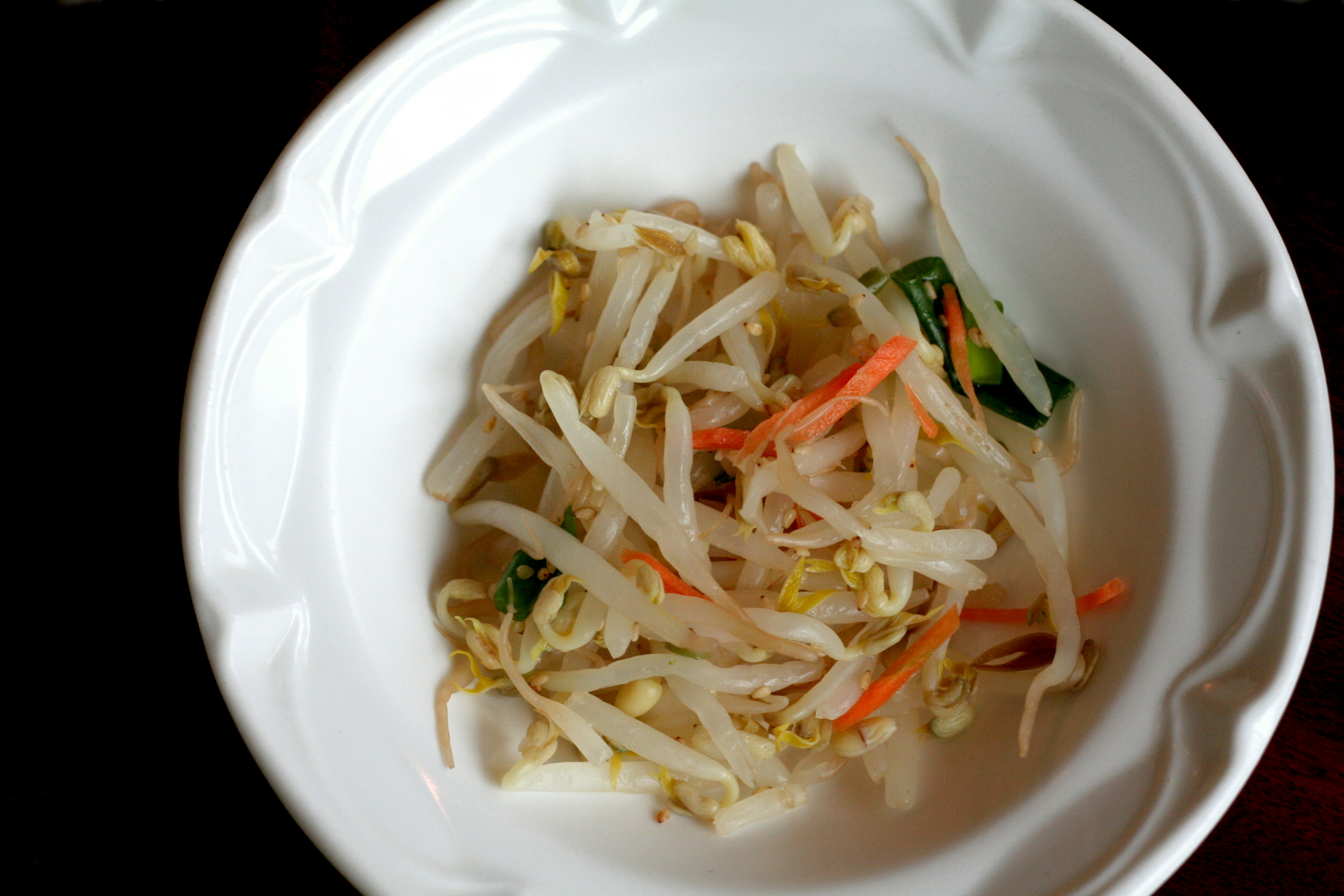
Sukjunamul

- Amchi (암치), female dried salted brown croakers, the fish itself is called Mineo(민어) in korean
- Eochae (어채; 魚菜), parboiled fish fillet
- Gaksaek jeongol, casserole made with various ingredients
- Galbijjim, braised meat short ribs
- Gannap, beef liver pancake
- Gaphoe, seasoned raw beef tripe
- Gimssam, wraps with gim, seaweed
- Gujeolpan, nine-sectioned plate
- Gulbi, dried salted yellow croaker
- Gulhoe, raw oyster
- Gwamegi, half-dried Pacific herring or Pacific saury
- Hobakseon, steamed stuffed zucchini
- Honghapcho, braised mussels in soy sauce
- Jang kimchi, water kimchi seasoned with soy sauce
- Jangajji, pickles.
- Jeonbokcho, braised abalone
- Jeotgal, salted fermented seafood
- Jokpyeon, gelatin
- Maedeup jaban, fried kombu in a ribbon shape
- Mitbanchan, basic side dishes made for preservation
- Mugeun namul bokkeum, sauteed dried various mountain vegetables
- Pyeonyuk
  - Useol pyeonyuk, pressed ox's tongue
  - Yangjimeori pyeonyuk, pressed beef bricket
- Sinseollo, royal casserole
- Suk kkakdugi, kimchi made with parboiled radish
- Sukju namul, sauteed mung bean spouts
- Suran, poached egg
- Tteokbokki, stir-fried tteok, and vegetables
- Tteokjjim, boiled tteok, beef and vegetables
- Yukgaejang, spicy beef soup with rice
- Yukpo, beef jerky

== Tteok (rice cakes) ==
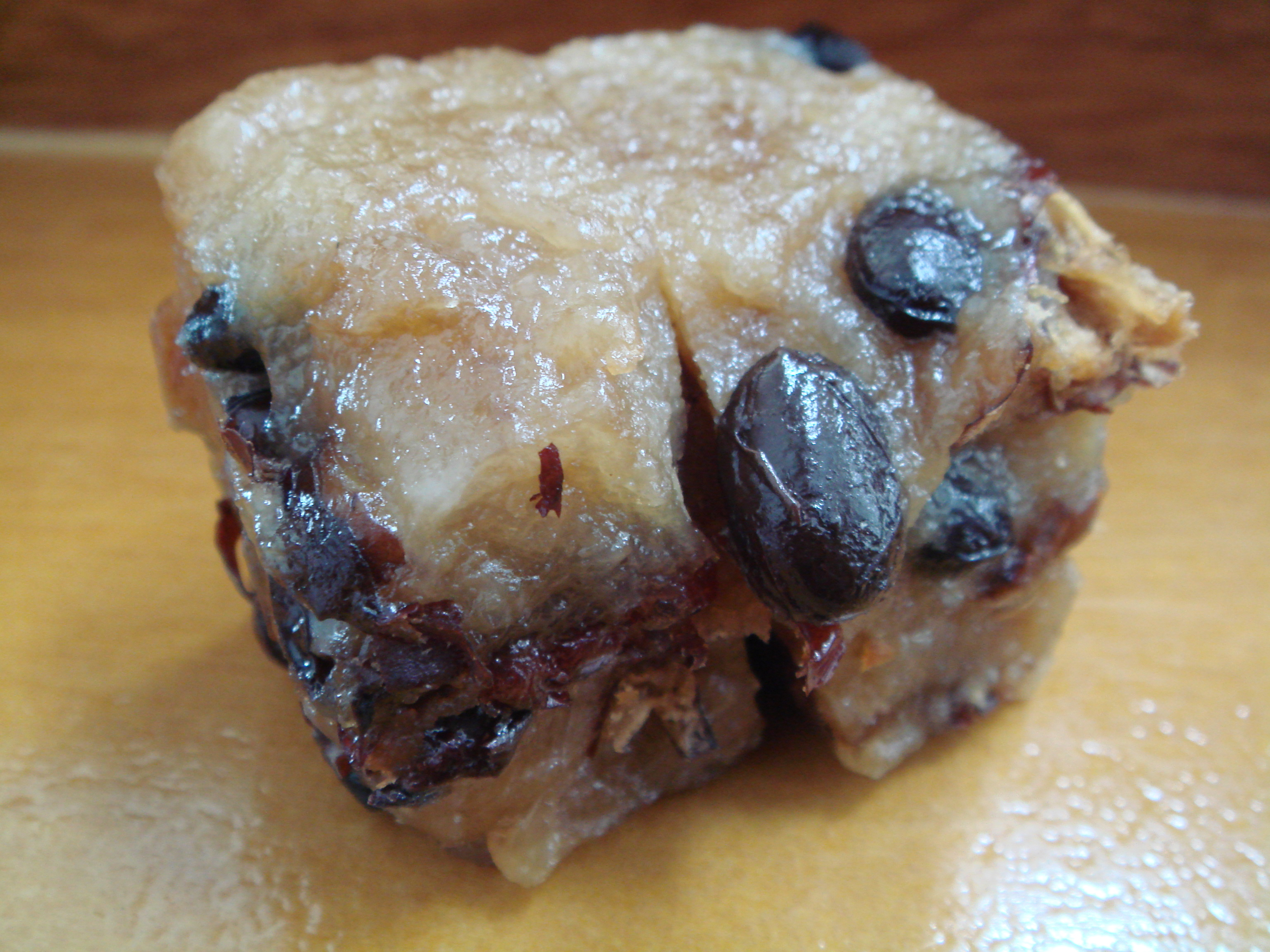
Kongtteok, a variety of tteok made with black bean

Tteokrice cakes

- Danja
  - Daechu danja, made with jujube
  - Ssukgullae danja, made with Artemisia princeps var. orientalis
  - Bam danja, made with chestnut
  - Yuja danja, made with yuzu
  - Eunghaeng danja, made with Gingko seeds
  - Geonsi danja, made with gotgam (dried persimmon)
  - Yulmu danja, made with Coix lacryma-jobi var. ma-yuen
  - Seogi danja, made with seogi (Umbilicaria esculenta)
- Duteop tteok, covered with azuki bean crumbles
- Gaksaekpyeon, made by adding color or flavors
- Hwajeon, made with flower petals
- Juak, made by pan-frying and honey-glazing
- Mulhobak tteok, made with pumpkin
- Neuti tteok, made with young leaves of Zelkova serrata
- Sangchu tteok, made with lettuce
- Solbangul tteok, made with pine cones
- Yaksik, made with nuts and jujubes

== Hangwa (confectioneries) ==
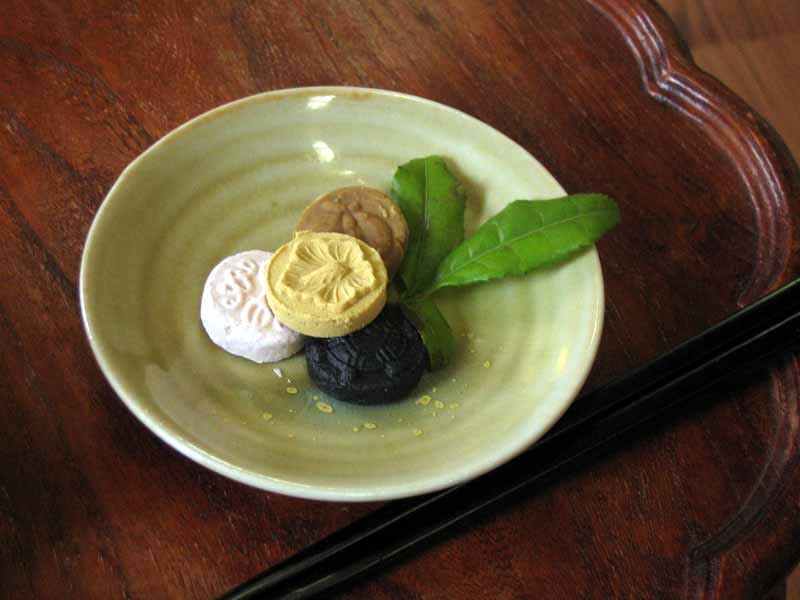
Dasik

Hangwa or Korean confectioneries

- Dasik, pattern pressed cake eaten when drinking tea.
  - Heukimja dasik, made with black sesame seeds
  - Kong dasik, made with soybean
  - Songhwa dasik, made with pine pollen powder
  - Bam dasik, made with chestnut
  - Jinmal dasik, made with a mixture of wheat flour and honey
  - Nongmal dasik, made with starch
  - Ssal dasik, made with rice
- Maejakgwa, oil-and-honey flour pastry
- Mandugwa, fried dumpling filled with sweeten jujube
  - Silkkae yeotgangjeong, covered with sesame seeds
  - Ttangkong yeotgangjeong, covered with peanuts
  - Baekjapyeon, covered with ground pine nuts
- Yakgwa, oil-and-honey pastry
- Yeotgangjeong, yeat mixed with roasted or raw grain.

== Eumcheongnyu (non-alcoholic beverages) ==
=== Hwachae ===
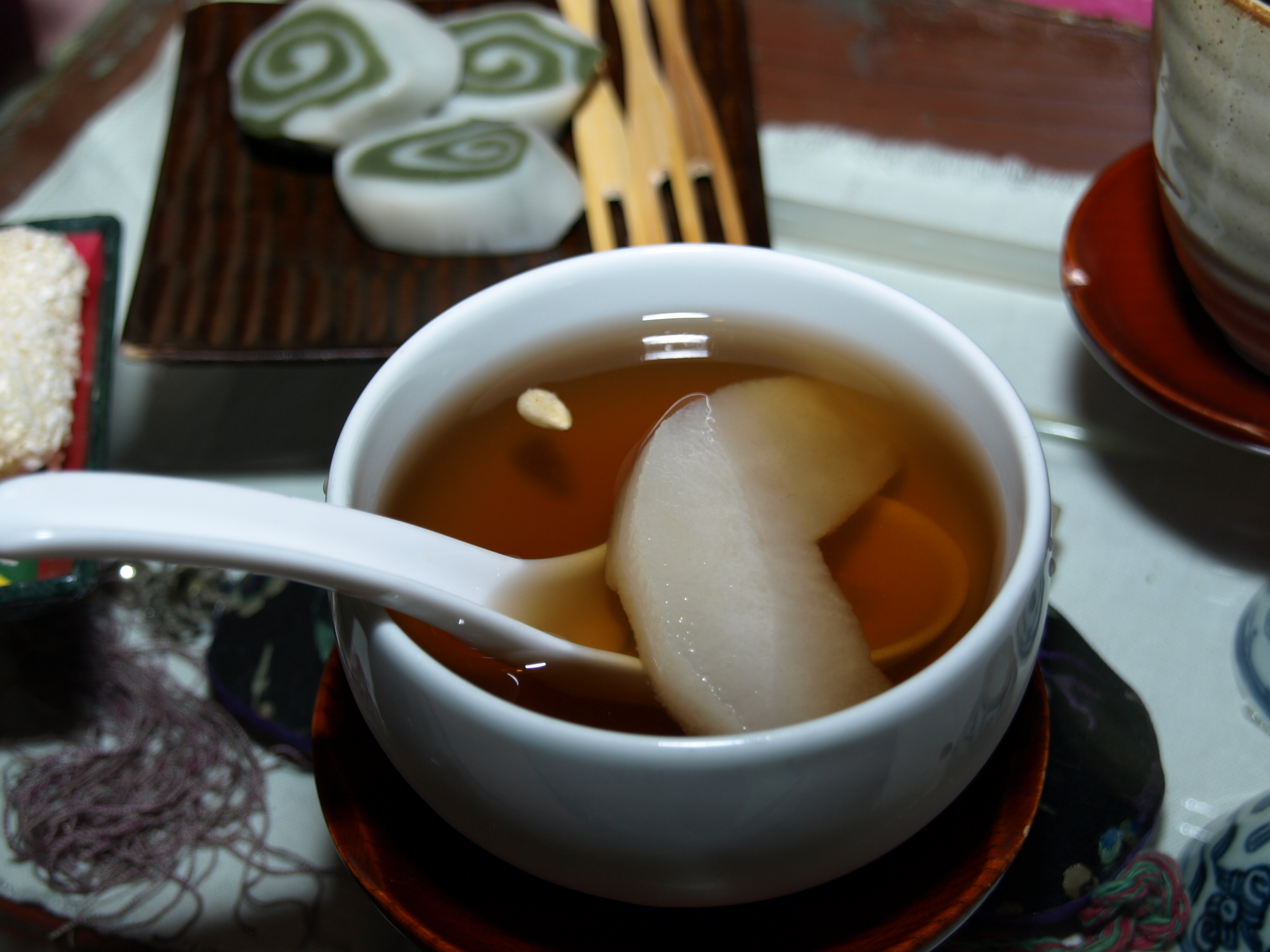
Baesuk is a type of hwachae

Hwachae, cold Korean punch made with fruits, edible flower petals, tteok, steamed grains, or traditional medical ingredients

- Bori sudan, barley punch
- Huintteok sudan, punch with garaetteok, cylindrical tteok
- Jindallae hwachae, punch with azalea petals
- Omija hwachae, Schisandra chinensis berry punch
- Wonsobyeong, punch with rice balls

=== Korean tea ===
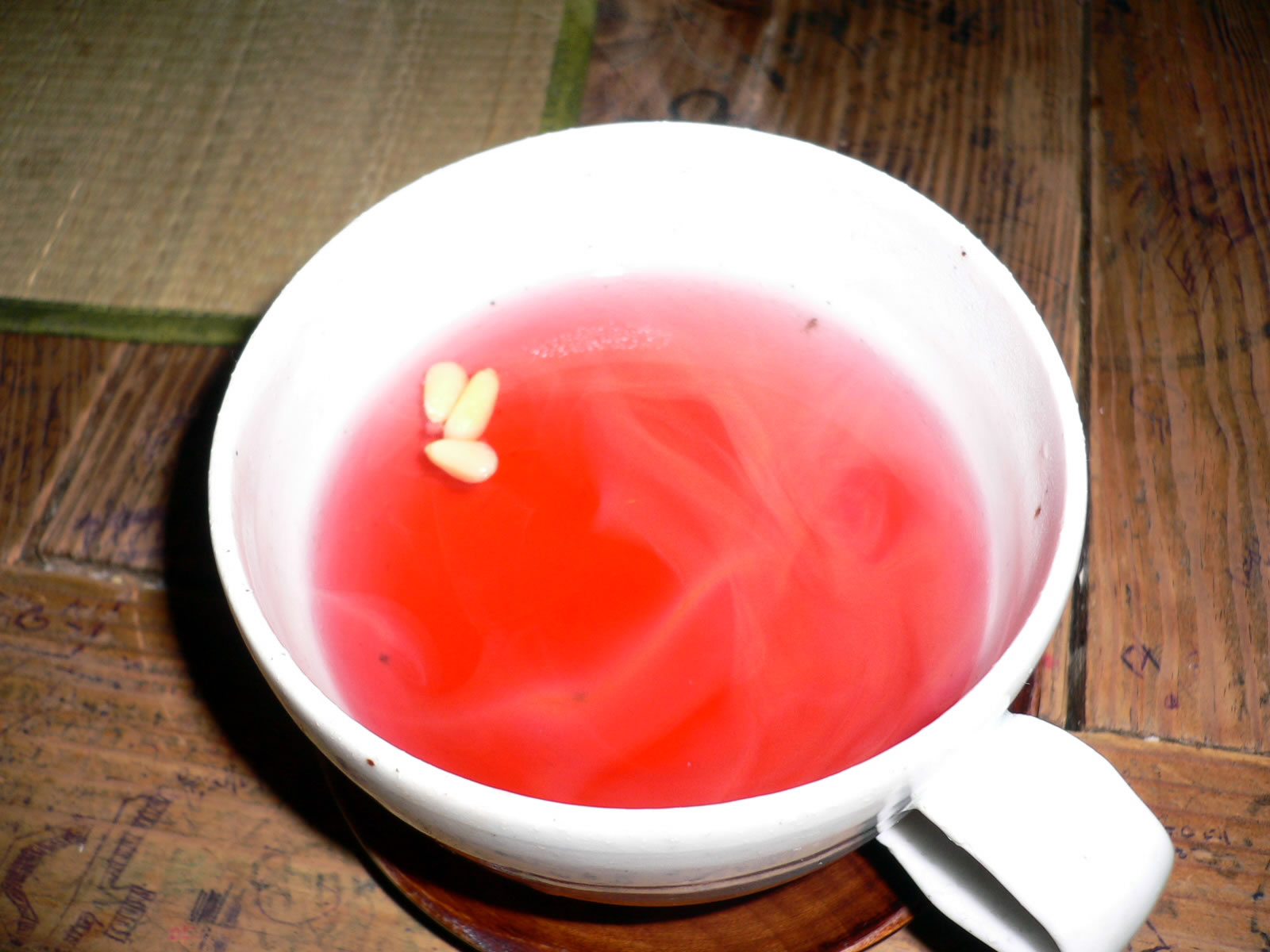
A mug of omija cha, a Korean herbal tea made from the berries of Schisandra chinensis.

Korean tea

- Daechu-cha, made with jujube
- Danggwi-cha, made with Angelica
- Gokcha, made with grains
- Gugija-cha, made with wolfberries
- Gyeolmyeongja-cha, made with Senna obtusifolia
- Gyepi-cha, made with cinnamon
- Jeho-tang, made with various traditional medicine was considered the best summer drink at Korean royal court. The cold drink is made with honey, water and the powders of dried and roasted Prunus mume fruits, Amomi Semen, Sandalwood Red, and Amomum tsao-ko.
- Misam-cha, made with Ginseng radicle
- Mogwa-cha, made with Chinese Quince
- Ogwa-cha, literally means "five fruits" is made with walnuts, chestnuts, Gingko seeds, jujube, and ginger.
- Omija-cha, made with Schisandra chinensis berries
- Saenggang-cha, made with ginger
- Yuja-cha, made with yuja

== See also ==
- Korean cuisine
- Korean royal court cuisine
- Korean temple cuisine
- List of Korean dishes
