= Atsushi Yasuda =

Japanese lichenologist

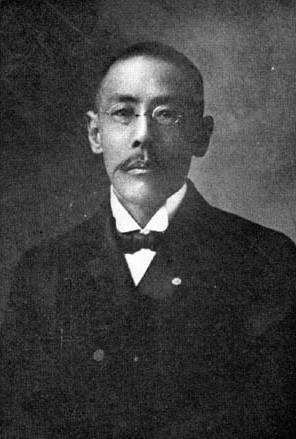
- Atsushi Yasuda
- Born: September 8, 1868; Tokyo, Japan
- Died: May 12, 1924 (aged 55)
- Scientific career
- Fields: Lichenology
- Institutions: University of Tokyo
- Academic advisors: Jinzō Matsumura, Manabu Miyoshi
- Author abbrev. (botany): Yasuda

Atsushi Yasuda (安田篤 Yasuda Atsushi; September 8, 1868 – May 12, 1924) was a Japanese lichenologist. For a time, he was the only lichenologist in Japan.

== Selected publications ==
- Yasuda, Atsushi (1921). "Drei neue Arten von Flechten". Bot. Mag. (Tokyo). 35 (412): 84–87. doi:10.15281/jplantres1887.35.84.
- Yasuda, Atsushi (1925). "Flechten Japans". Res. Bull. Saito Ho-on Kai Mus. 2: 1–118.
