= Bánh đậu xanh =

Vietnamese and Chinese pastry

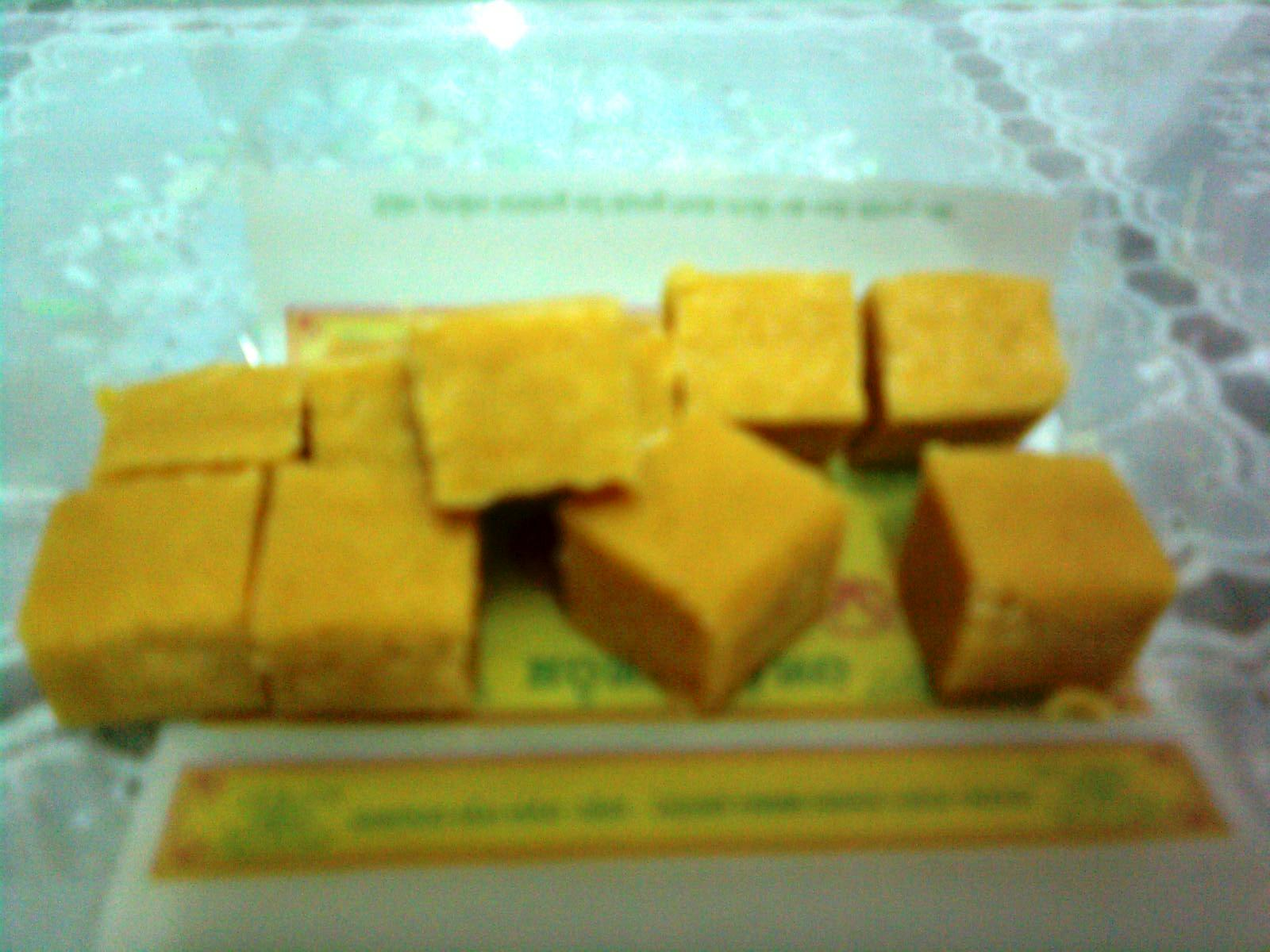
Hải Dương bánh đậu xanh

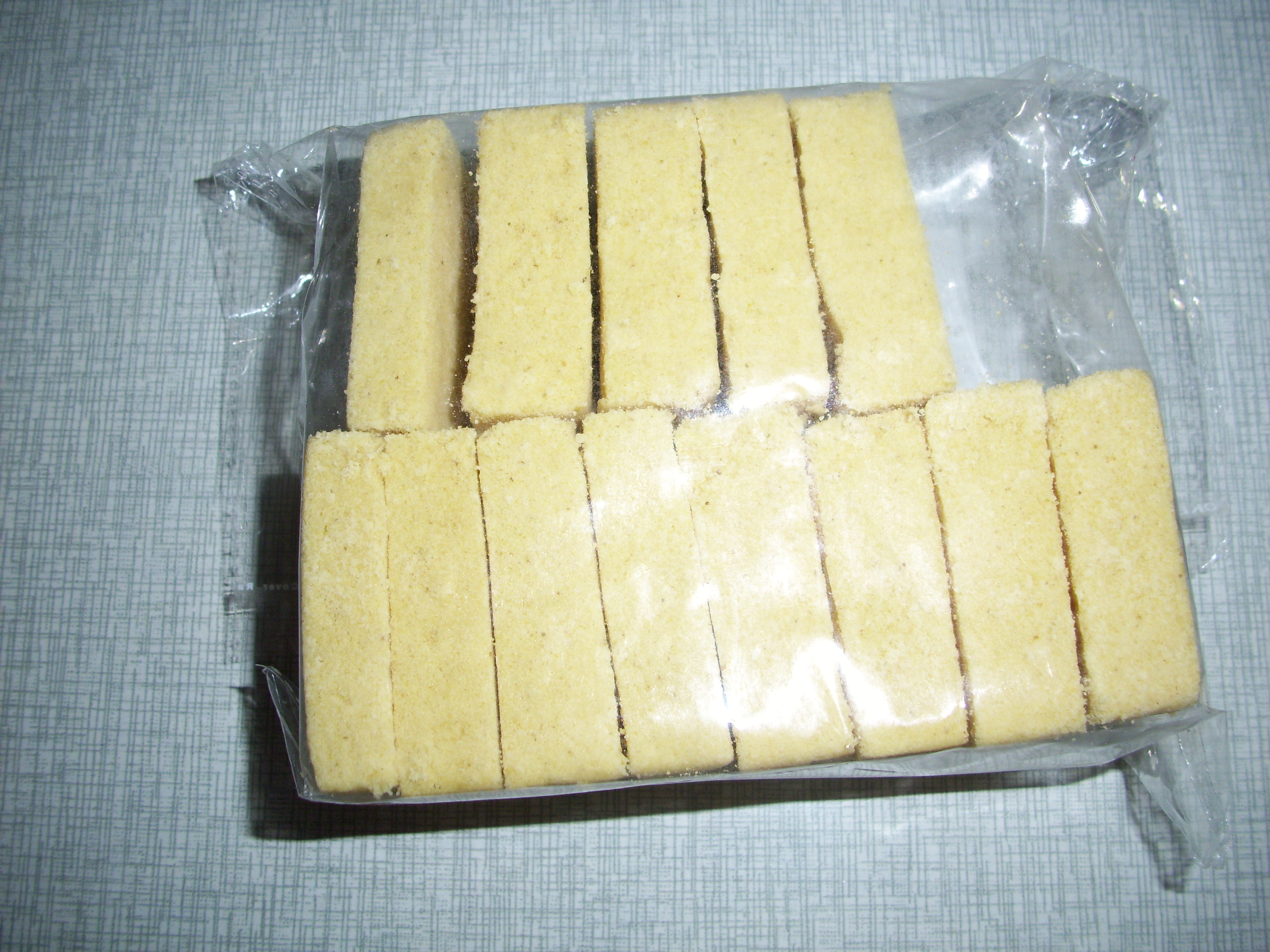
Beijing lüdou gao

Bánh đậu xanh (chữ Nôm: 𩚵豆靑, mung bean pastry) is a type of bánh in Vietnamese cuisine. It is a specialty of Hải Dương province. It is made of mung bean, sugar, and fat (lard or vegetable oil).

Other Asian countries have similar sweets. In China, Lüdou gao (绿豆糕, mung bean pastry) and lüdou huang (綠豆黄), are two types of mung bean pastries, with the former being dry and the latter being wet and fermented. In Indonesia, the Ongol ongol hunkwe is made from mungo bean starch, coconut milk and palm sugar.

== Gallery ==
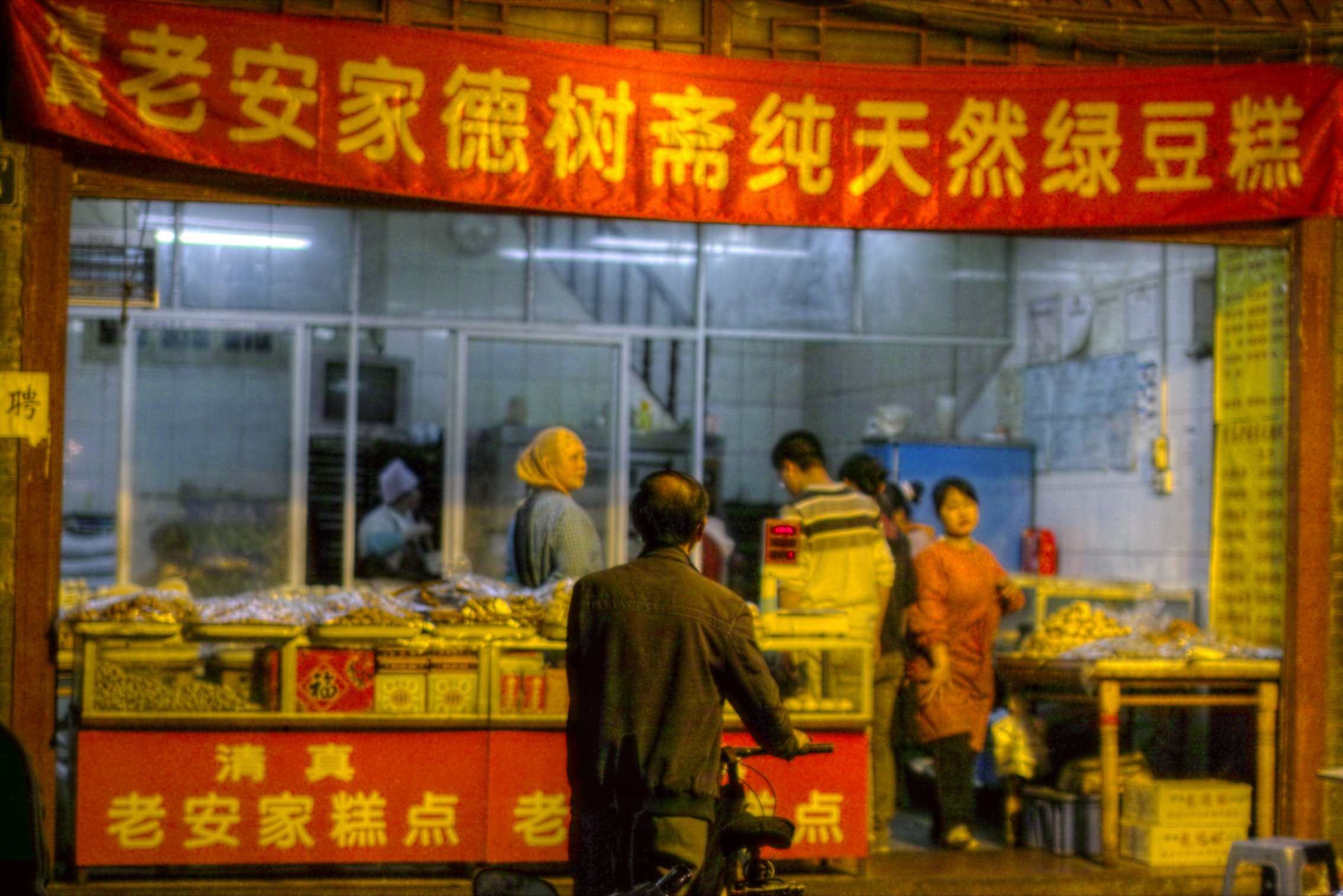
Islamic mung bean cake specialty store in Xi'an, Shaanxi

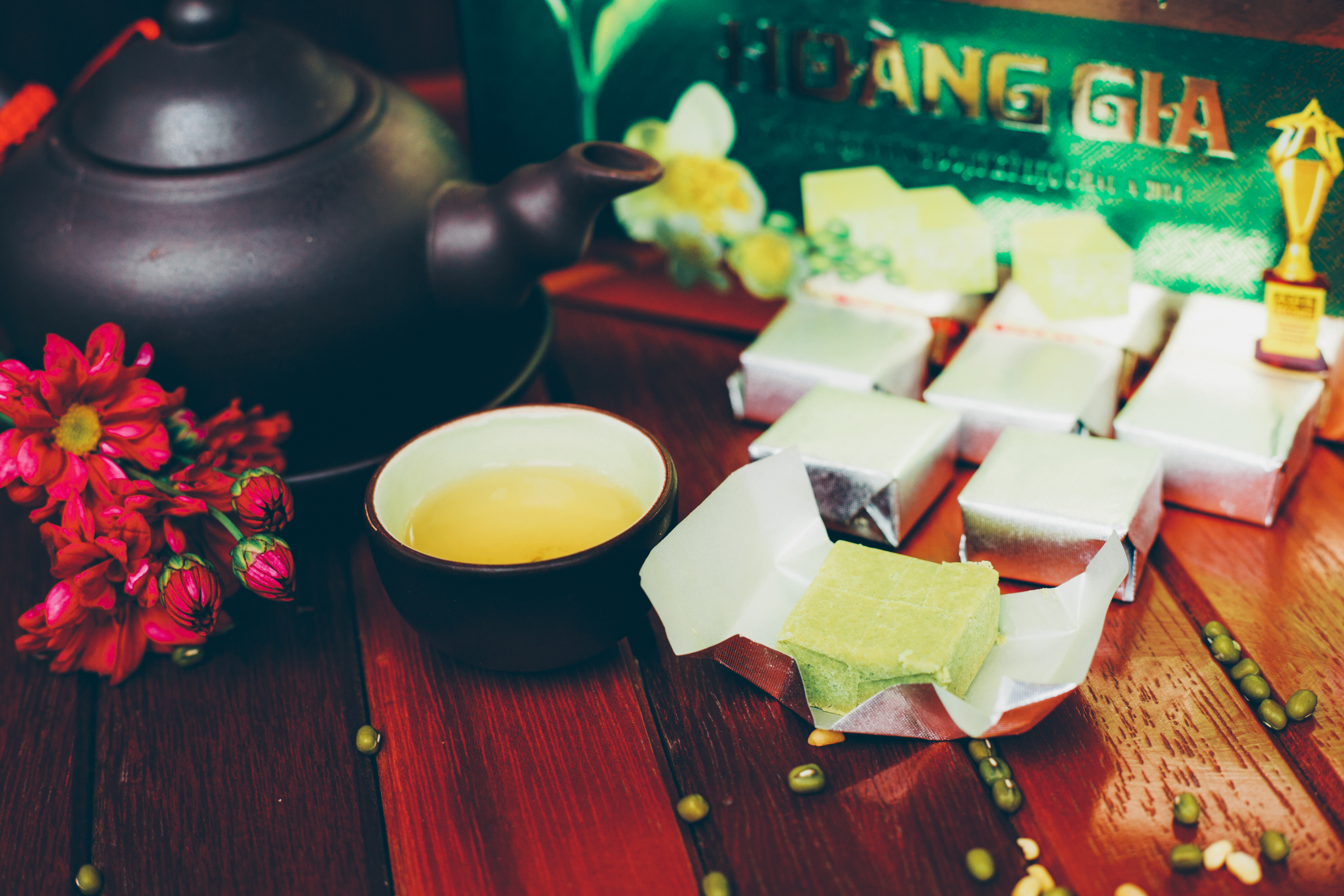
Eating bánh đậu xanh with green tea, a Vietnamese tradition

== See also ==
- Dasik
