= Jokpyeon =

Korean aspic dish

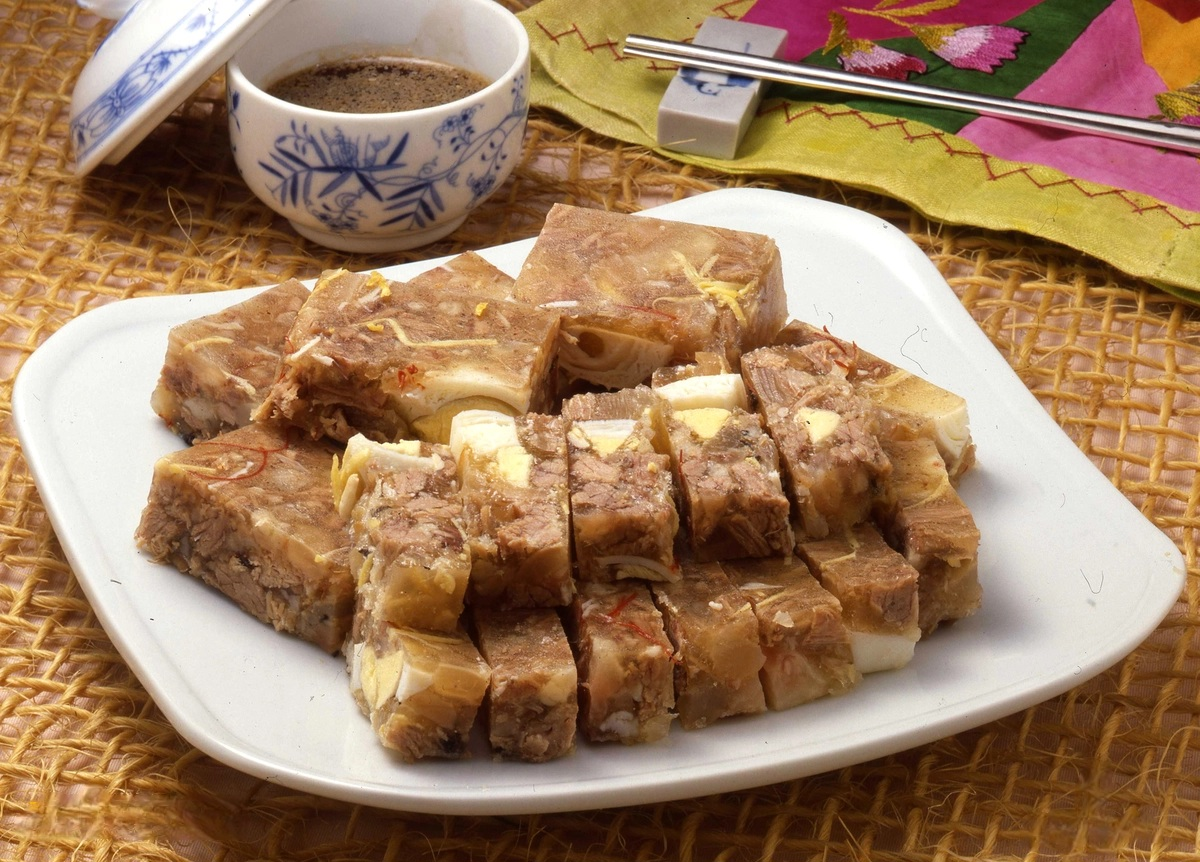
- Type: Aspic
- Place of origin: Korea
- Associated cuisine: Korean cuisine
- Main ingredients: Cow's trotters
- Similar dishes: Muk

Korean name
- Hangul: 족편
- Hanja: 足편
- RR: jokpyeon
- MR: chokp'yŏn
- IPA: [tɕok̚.pʰjʌn]

Jokpyeon (Korean: 족편) is a dish in Korean cuisine prepared by boiling cow's trotters and other cuts with high collagen content, such as cow's head, skin, tail and pig's head in water for a long time, so that the stewing liquid sets to form a jelly-like substance when cooled. The dish largely depends on cow's trotters, which explains its name that consists of jok (족; 足; "foot") and pyeon (편; "tteok"). Jokpyeon is sometimes classified as muk, a Korean jelly category made from grain starch, due to the similar appearance and characteristics.

== Preparation ==
Finely chunked cow's trotters and other cuts with high collagen content, such as cow's head, leather cuts, tail, and pig's head are boiled in water for a long time. The cuts contain large amounts of tendon, which comes with collagen that melts down while boiling or stewing for a long time and solidifies when cooled. Sometimes, beef foreshank or pheasant meat is added to give the dish more texture and enhance the flavor, in which case those meats are taken out after an hour or two, and reserved to be used later. Stewed liquid along with the meat and cartilage but without the bones is poured into a square or rectangular vessel, mixed with the foreshank or pheasant meat, garnished with thin strips of rock tripe, egg garnish and chili threads, and allowed to set in a cold place. Solidified jokpyeon is sliced and served with a dipping sauce such as cho-ganjang (soy sauce mixed with vinegar) or saeu-jeot (salted shrimp).

== Varieties ==
- Jokjanggwa (족장과) – jokpyeon colored with soy sauce and set with boiled eggs.
- Yongbong-jokpyeon (용봉족편) – jokpyeon made with cow's trotters and pheasant meat. The pheasant meat can be substituted by chicken meat.

== See also ==
- Brawn
- Jellied eels
- Jokbal
- Pyeonyuk
