= List of tteok varieties =

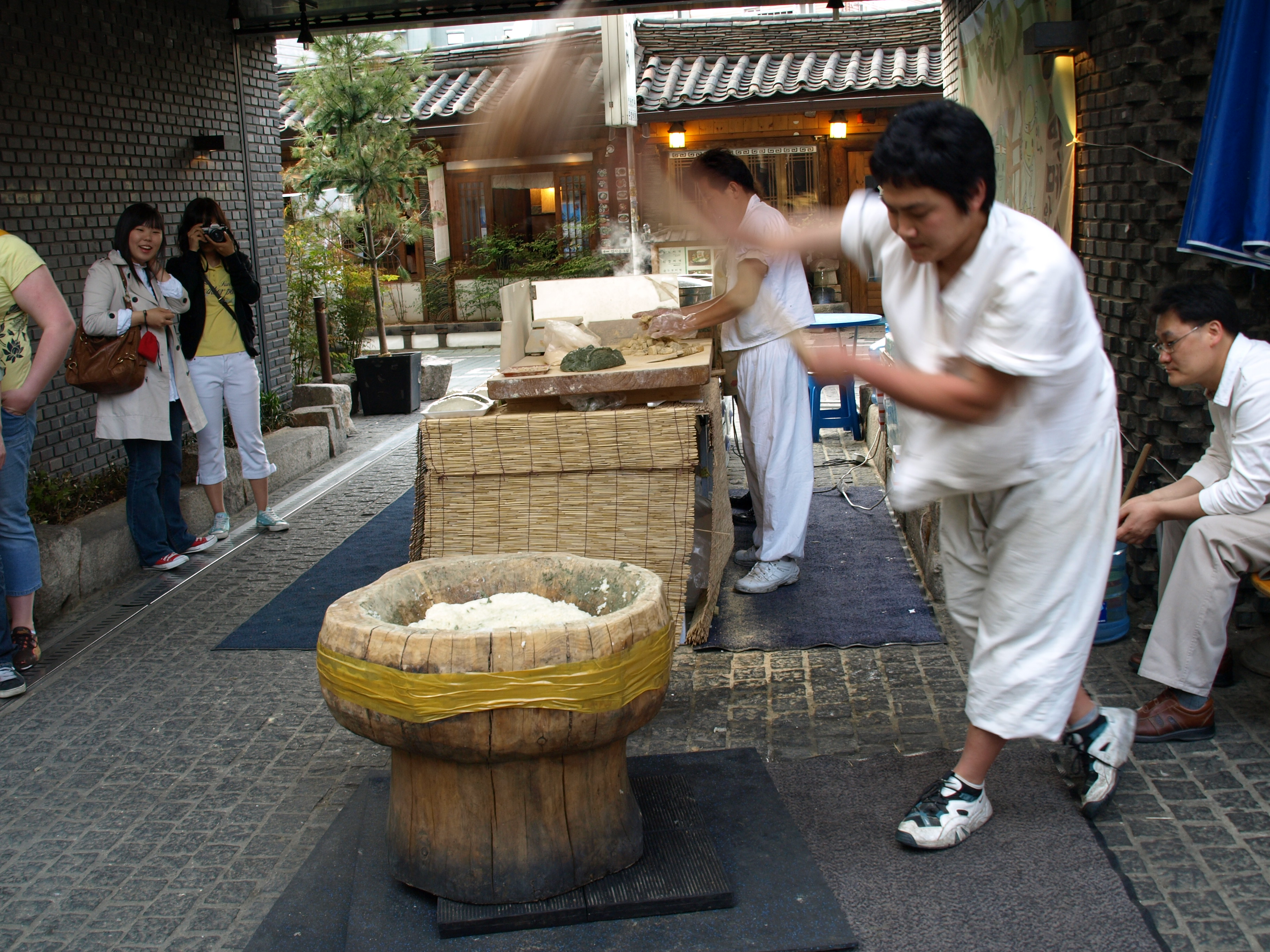
Pounding tteok

This is a list of varieties of tteok, traditional rice cakes in Korean cuisine.

== Steamed tteok ==
- Sirutteok (시루떡), steamed tteok
- Duteop tteok (두텁떡) - a variety of royal court tteok (궁중떡), is covered 3 layers - duteop powder [outside, made of black-line white bean (흰팥)], sweet rice [middle], and variety nuts and fruits [inside, including chestnut, date (jujube), pinenut, yuja, duteop-so]
- Baekseolgi (백설기) – a variety of siru tteok. It literally means "white snow tteok", and is made of white rice and whole raisins
- Kongtteok (콩떡) – tteok made with various kinds of beans
- Jeungpyeon (증편) – tteok made with makgeolli (unfiltered rice wine)
- Mujigae tteok (무지개떡) – literally "rainbow tteok"; this variety of tteok has colorful stripes. The tteok is used especially for janchi (잔치), Korean banquet, party, or feast like dol (celebrating a baby's first birthday), Hwangap (celebrating 60 years old people's birthday), or gyeonhon janchi (wedding party).

== Pounded tteok ==
- Injeolmi (인절미)
  - Pat injeolmi (팥인절미) - tteok made with azuki beans (팥)
  - Kkaeinjeolmi (깨인절미) - tteok made with black sesame (검은깨)
  - Ssuk injeolmi (쑥인절미) - tteok made with Artemisia indica
  - Surichwi injeolmi (수리취인절미) - tteok made with Synurus deltoides (AIT.) NAKAI
- Garaetteok (가래떡; also called hwin tteok, 흰떡, literally "white tteok") – tteok formed into a long white cylinder. The thinly sliced garae tteok is used for making tteokguk, while the thicker cylinder shaped tteok is used in tteokbokki.

== Shaped tteok ==
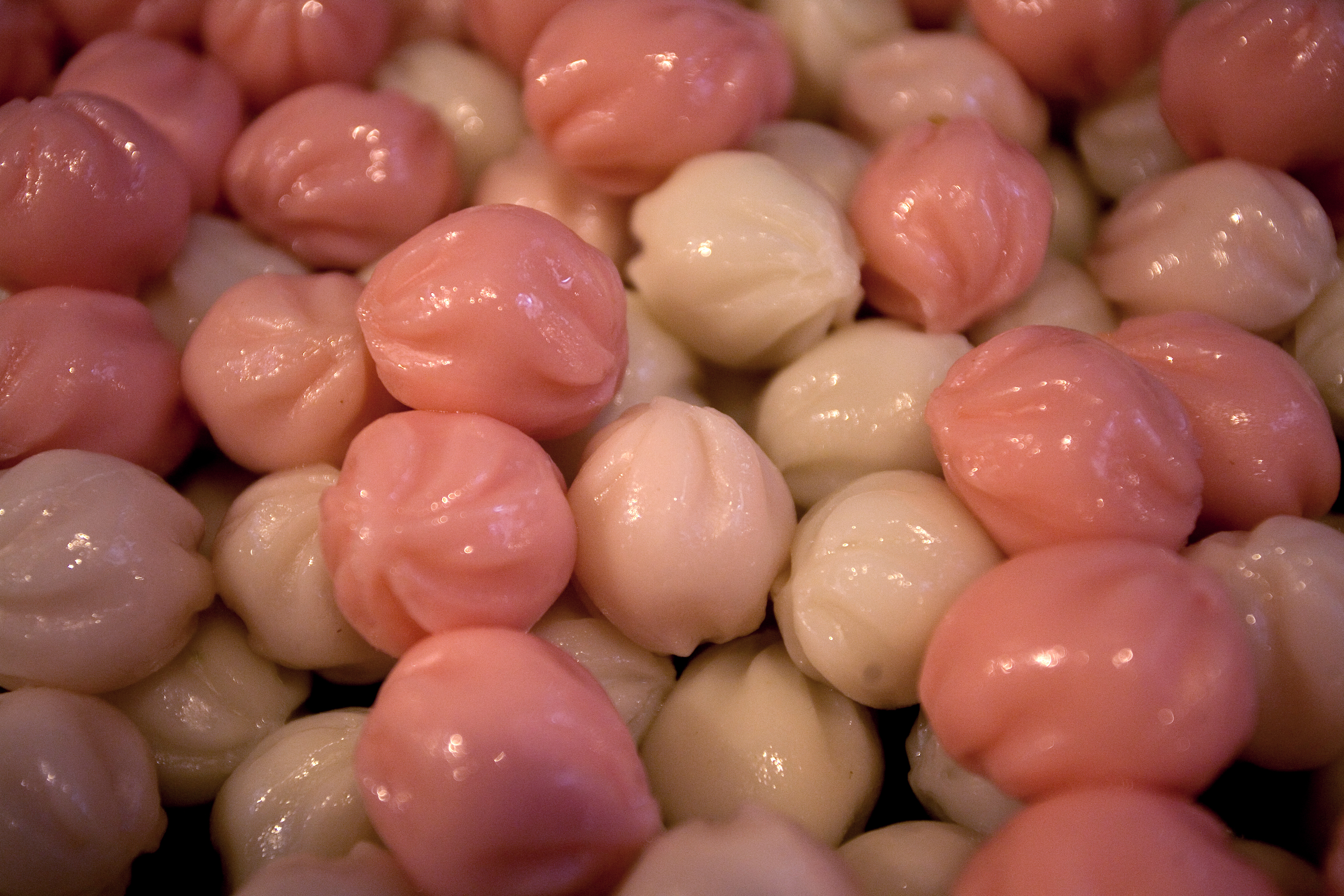
Kkul tteok (꿀떡)

- Kkul tteok (꿀떡) – literally means "honey" but this tteok is stuffed with Korean syrup. Ggul tteok is similar to songpyeon in shape, but smaller in size
- Songpyeon (송편) – eaten during the Chuseok holiday
- Gochitteok (고치떡) - made with strawberry powder, Artemisia princeps var. orientalis (쑥) and gardenia seeds (치자)
- Ssamtteok (쌈떡) – tteok used for ssam (쌈, food wrapped in a leaf)
- Dalgal tteok (닭알떡) – named after the Korean word for egg (달걀 or 계란)
- Gyeongdan (경단) – inside these rice balls are usually azuki bean or sesame paste. Then they are usually dipped and covered in black sesame or other powders.
- Bupyeon (부편) – consists of a dough made from glutinous rice flour with a sweet filling that is covered with gomul, a kind of powdered bean.

== Pan-fried tteok ==
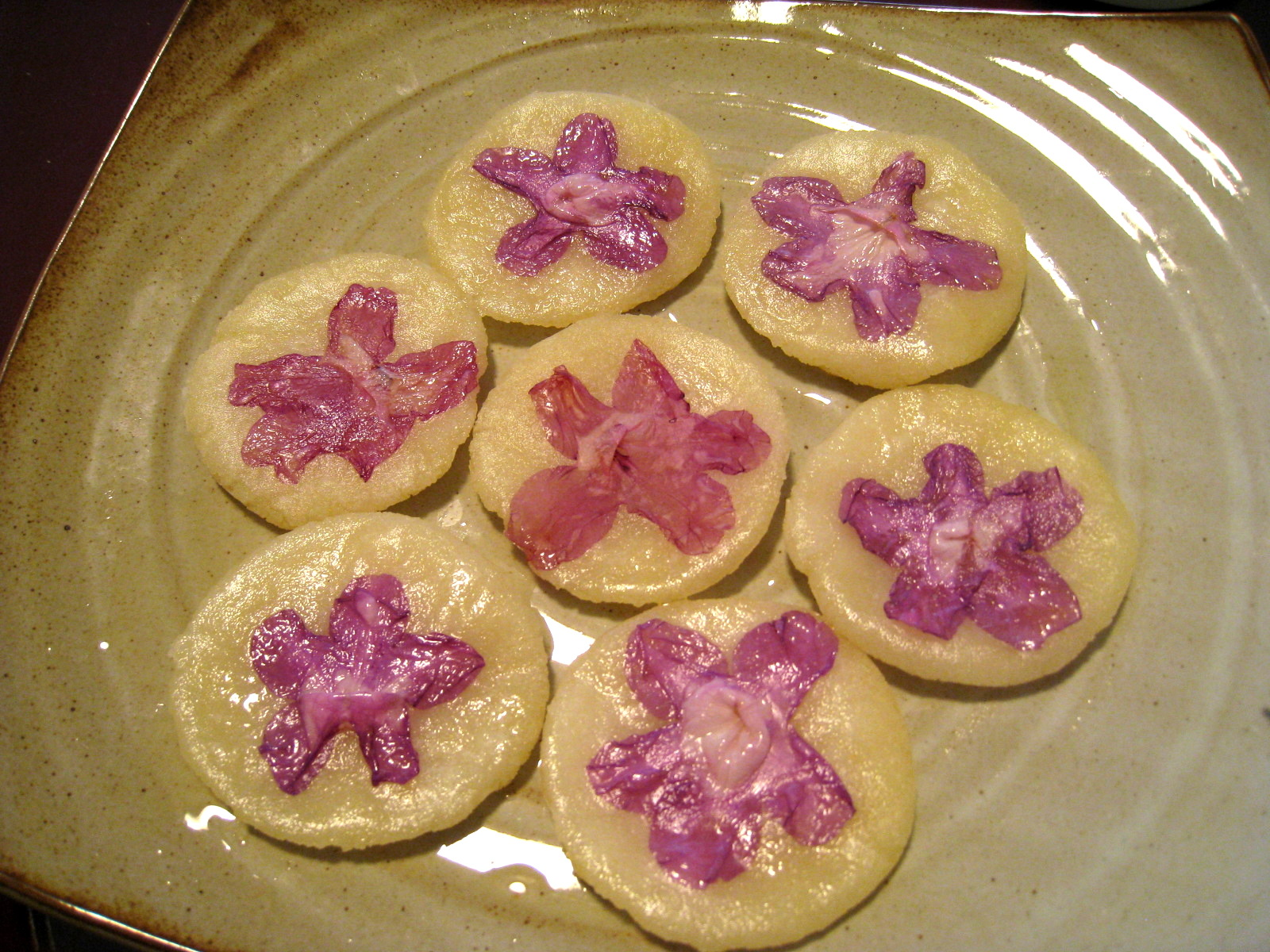
Jindallae hwajeon

- Hwajeon (화전) – small sweet pancakes made of glutinous rice flour and flower petals of Korean azalea, chrysanthemum, or rose
- Bukkumi (부꾸미), pan-fried sweet tteok with various fillings in a crescent shape
- Juak (주악), made of glutinous rice flour and stuffed with fillings such as mushrooms, jujubes, and chestnuts, and pan-fried. Juak are colored with natural coloring and covered with sugar or coated in honey.

== Non-rice tteok ==
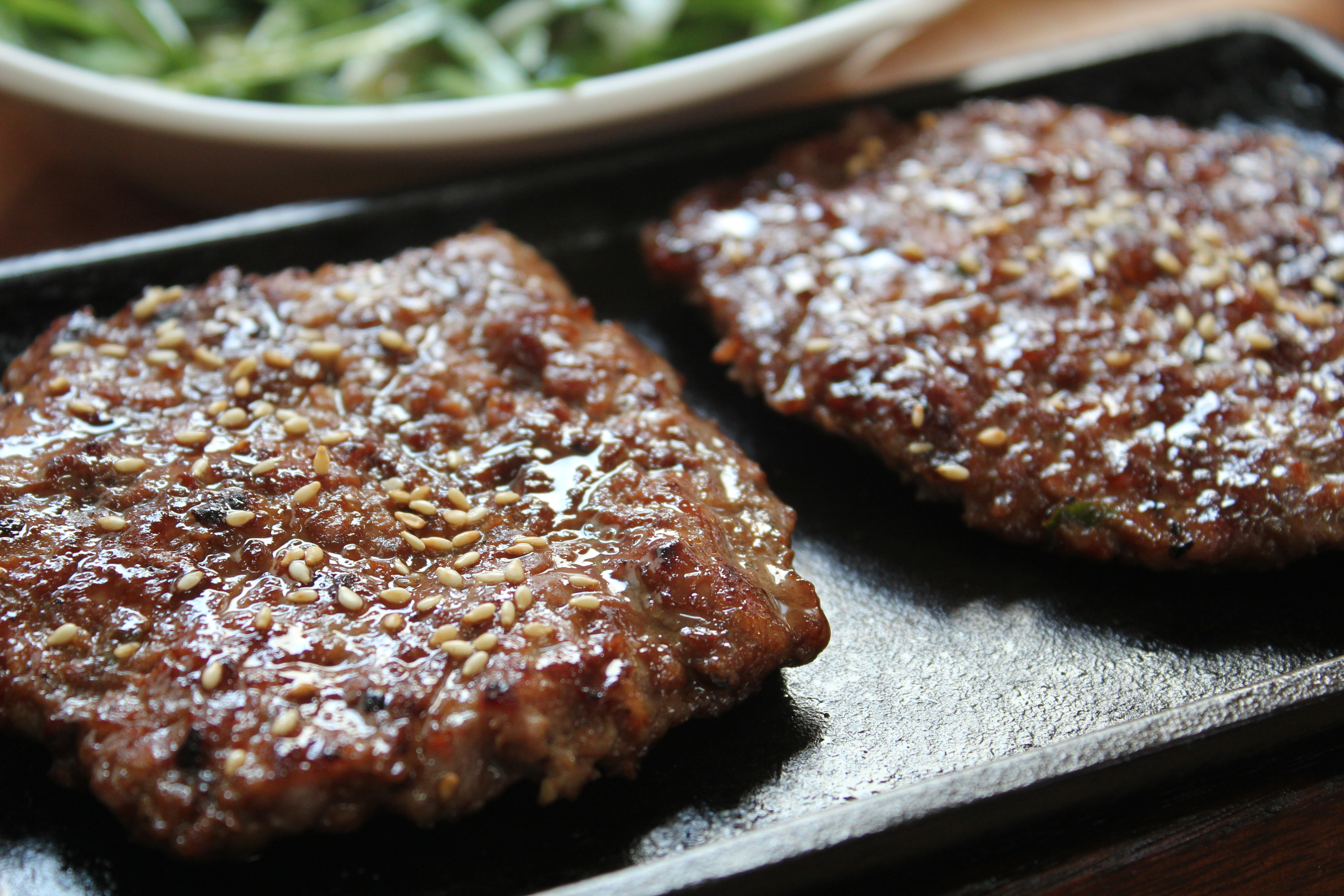
Tteok-galbi

- Tteok-galbi (떡갈비) is made of formed minced rib meat, or galbi (갈비). The name literally translates to "cake ribs" and is a metaphorical reference to the process of kneading and shaping rice-based tteok.

== See also ==
- List of Korean desserts
