= Pyeonyuk =

Korean boiled beef or pork dish

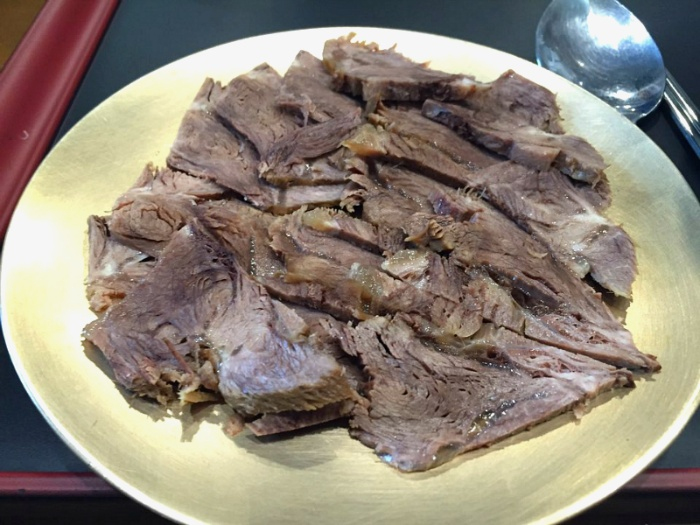
- Beef pyeonyuk
- Place of origin: Korea
- Associated cuisine: Korean cuisine
- Serving temperature: 15–25 °C (59–77 °F)
- Main ingredients: Beef (brisket, plate, foreshank, tongue, testicle, mammary, head, liver, spleen, trotters) or pork (belly, head, trotters)
- Food energy (per 1 serving): 42.5 kcal (178 kJ)

Korean name
- Hangul: 편육
- Hanja: 片肉
- RR: pyeonyuk
- MR: p'yŏnyuk
- IPA: [pʰjʌ.njuk̚]

Pyeonyuk (Korean: 편육; Hanja: 片肉) is a traditional Korean dish, which consists of thinly sliced meat that has been boiled and pressed. Either beef or pork may be used to make the dish.

It is eaten as anju (an accompaniment to alcoholic drinks), or used as a topping for other dishes such as naengmyeon (cold noodles) and seolleongtang (ox bone soup). In the past, pyeonyuk was made during the preparation of a large amount of beef stock or broth for various dishes served during feasts and banquets. Today, it is also used in non-traditional dishes, such as a cold cut in wrap sandwiches, and is considered to be a healthier alternative to deep-fried, stir-fried, or roasted meat.

== Preparation and serving ==
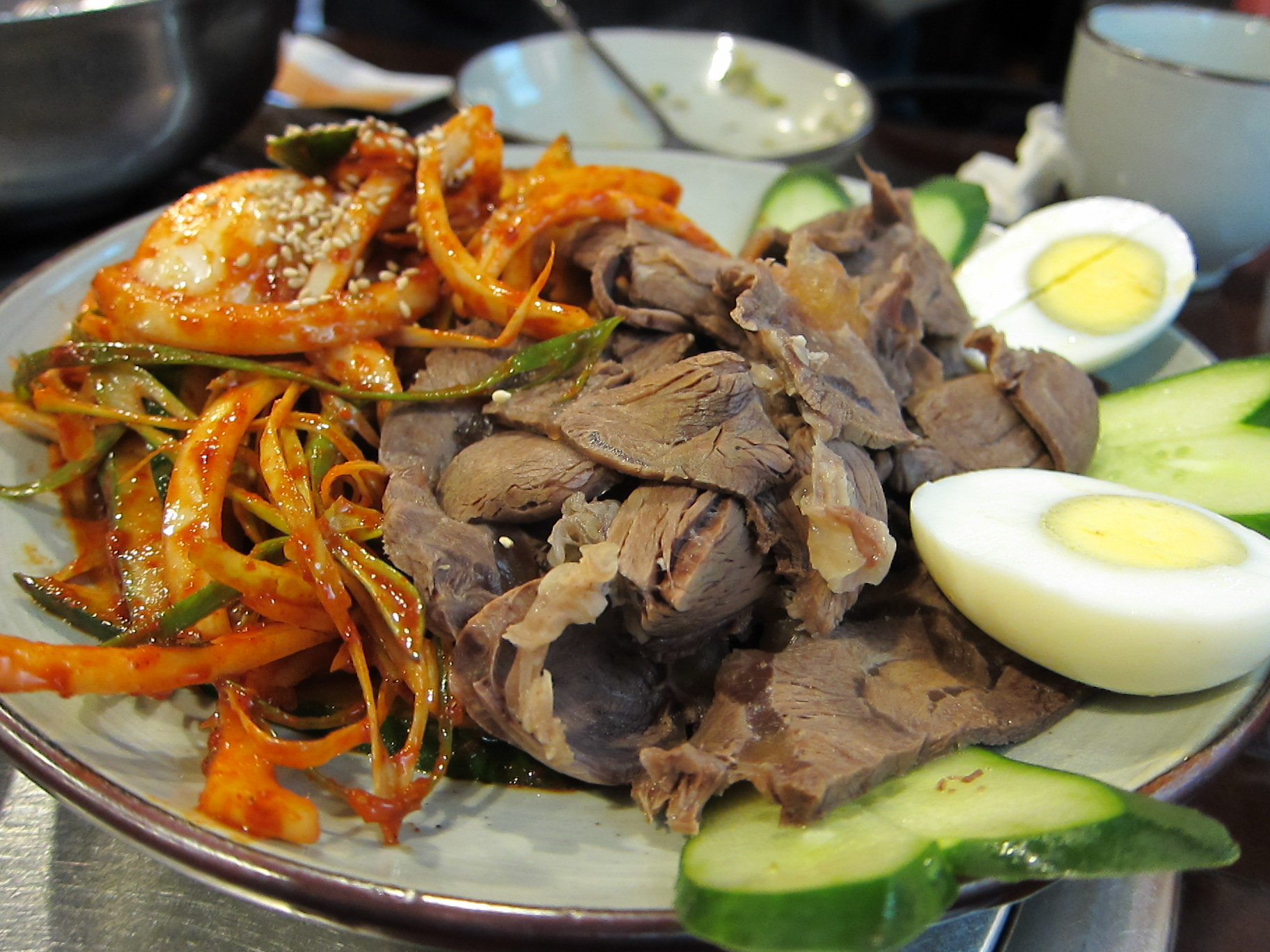
Pyeonyuk with eggs, kimchi and cucumber

Beef pyeonyuk mainly uses brisket, plate, foreshank, tongue, testicle, mammary, head, liver, spleen, and trotters, while pork pyeonyuk uses belly, head, and trotters.

The meat is always soaked in cold water to remove blood, and it is boiled as a whole chunk until tender. The broth for cooking the meat is flavored with salt and other seasonings that may vary from household to household, and can include doenjang (soybean paste), soju, cheongju (rice wine), black peppercorns, or coffee powder. Scallions and whole garlic cloves are a common addition in the broth when beef is used, and sliced ginger for pork.

After the meat is tender, it is wrapped in cloth and pressed with a weight. Then it is sliced thin and served with a dipping sauce: cho-ganjang (soy sauce–vinegar mixture) or gyeoja-chojang (soy sauce, vinegar, and mustard mixture) for the beef pyeonyuk, and saeu-jeot (salted shrimps) for the pork pyeonyuk. Pork pyeonyuk may also be eaten wrapped with baechu-kimchi (cabbage kimchi), or in lettuce or perilla leaves as ssam (wrap). Common side dishes for pyeonyuk include geotjeori (fresh kimchi), mu-mallaengi-muchim (spicy dried radish salad), and saengchae-muchim (spicy vegetable salad).

Pyeonyuk may also be used as a topping for other dishes such as naengmyeon (cold noodles), and seolleongtang (ox bone soup).

== Gallery ==
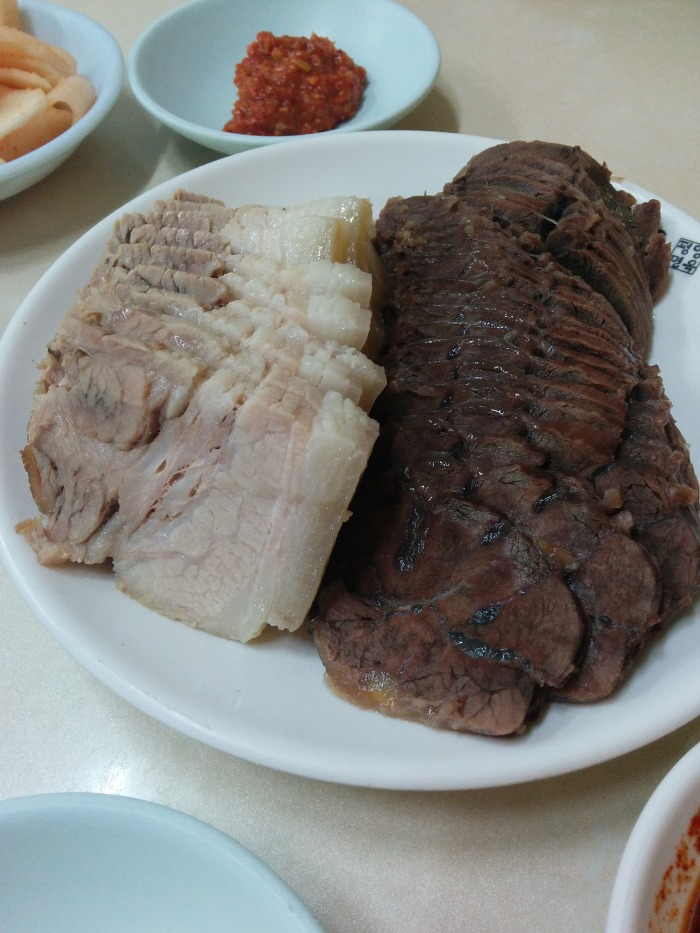
Suyuk (boiled pork slices) and pyeonyuk

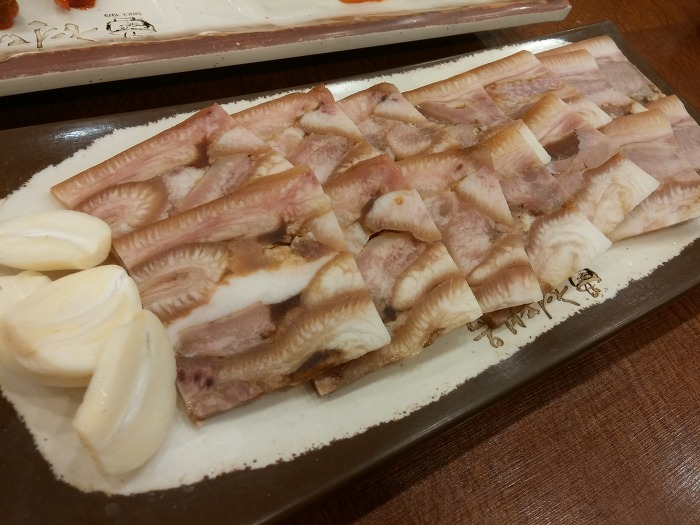
Dwaeji-meori-pyeonyuk (pressed boiled pork head slices) served with garlic

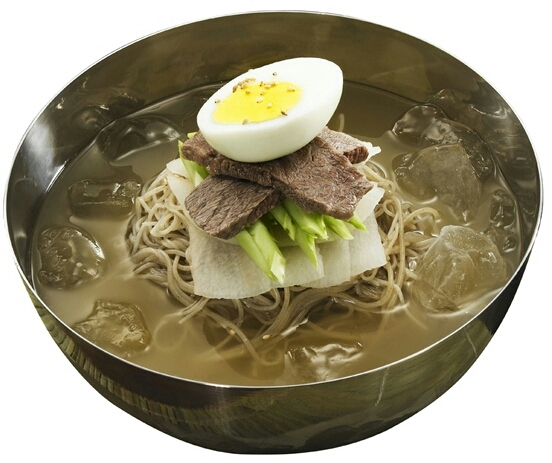
Naengmyeon (cold noodles) topped with boiled egg, pyeonyuk, cucumber, and pickled radish

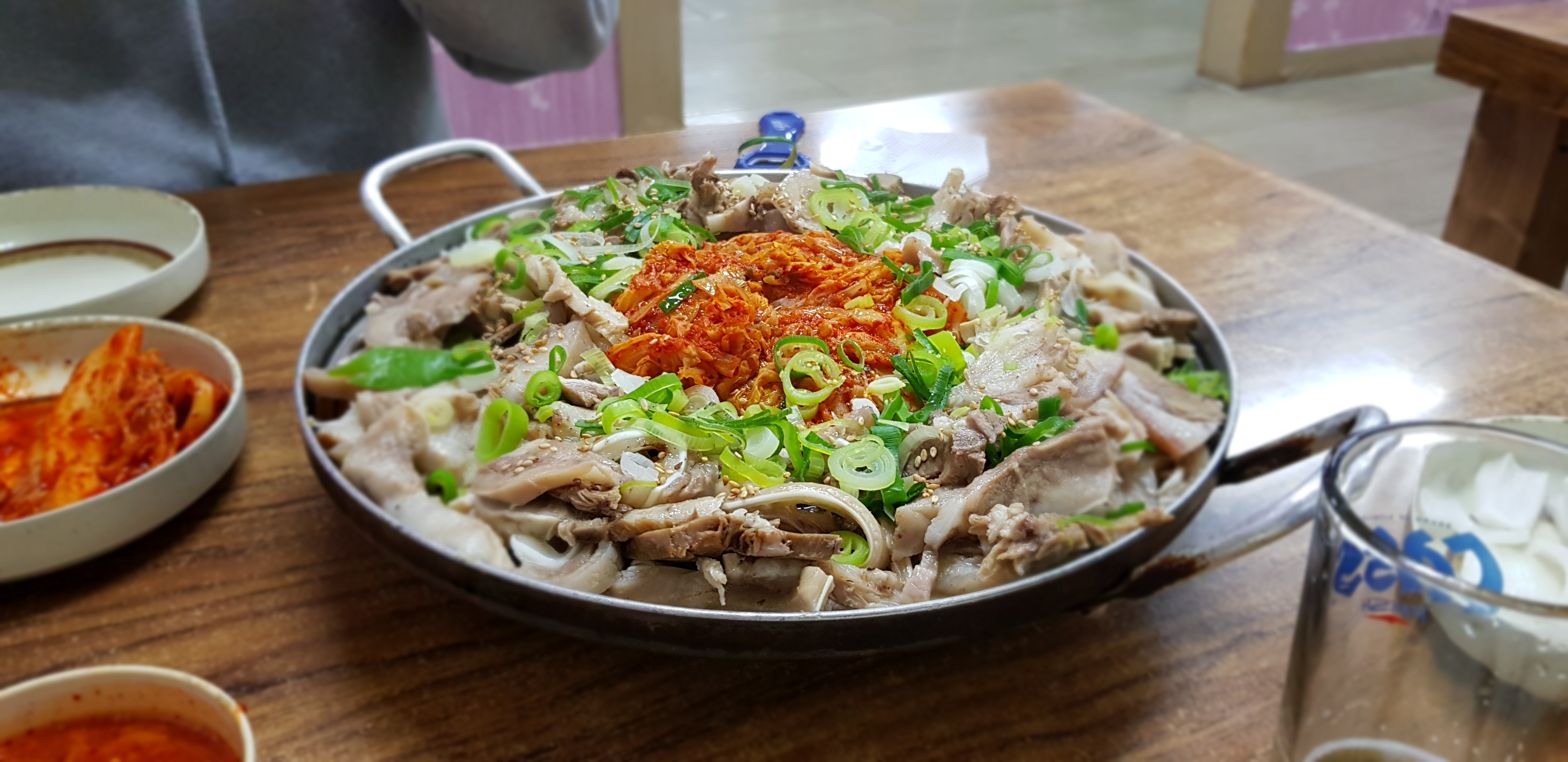
Pyeonuk with kimchi and green onions

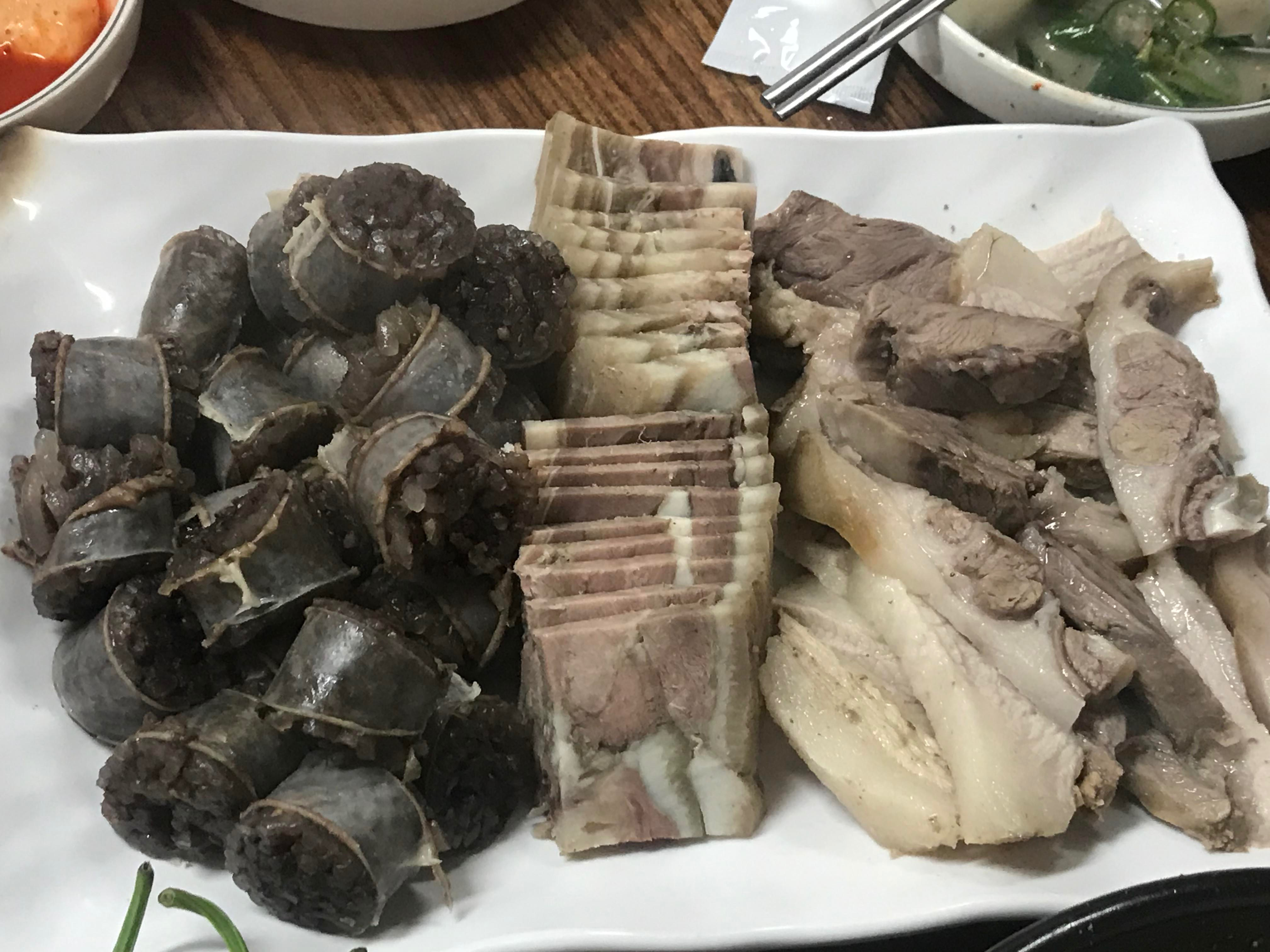
Pyeonyuk with sundae sausages

== See also ==
- Head cheese
- Jokpyeon
