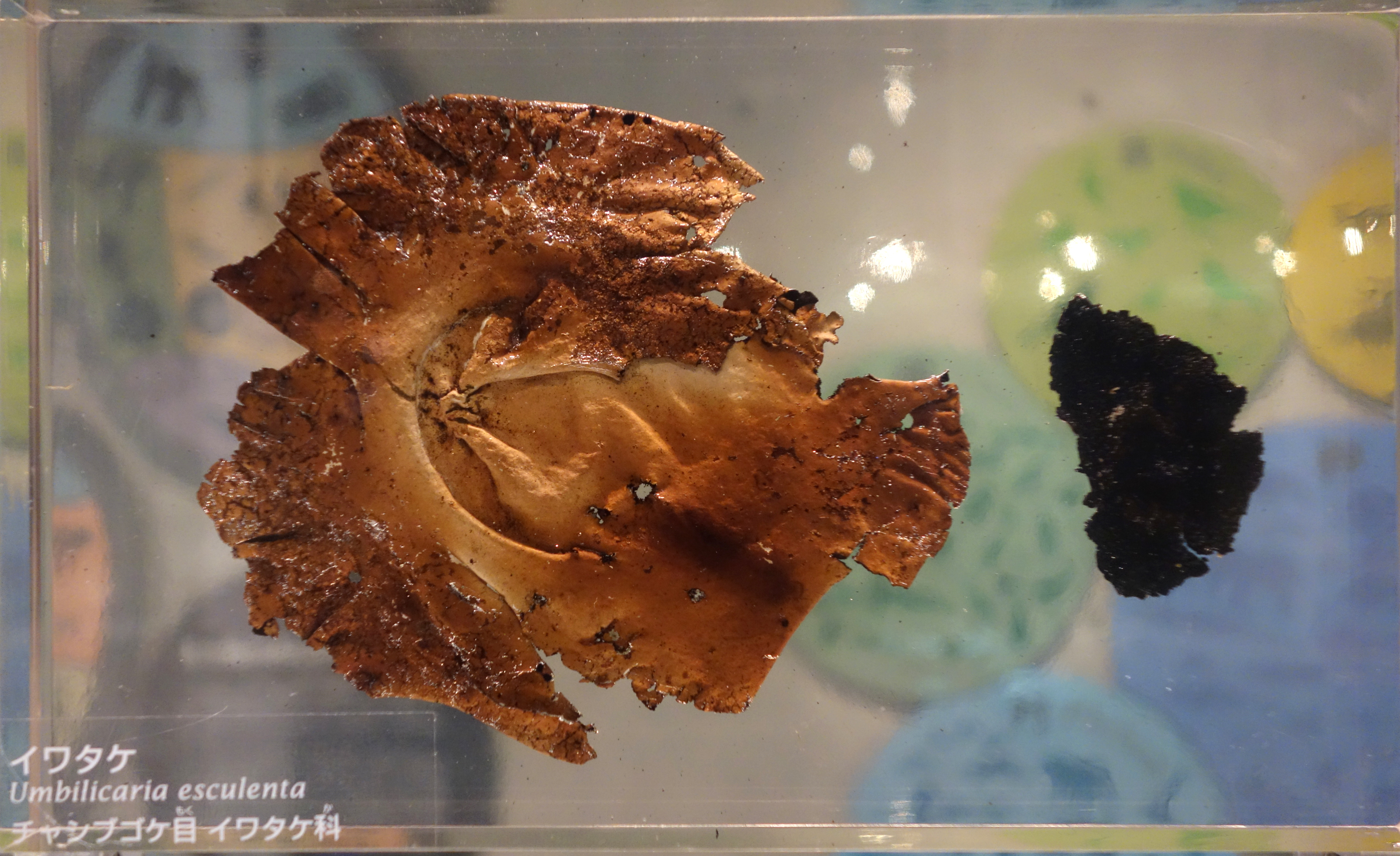

Scientific classification
- Domain: Eukaryota
- Kingdom: Fungi
- Division: Ascomycota
- Class: Lecanoromycetes
- Order: Umbilicariales
- Family: Umbilicariaceae
- Genus: Umbilicaria
- Species: U. esculenta

Binomial name
- Umbilicaria esculenta (Miyoshi) Minks (1900)

Synonyms
- Gyrophora esculenta Miyoshi (1893)

= Umbilicaria esculenta =

Species of lichen

Umbilicaria esculenta, the rock tripe or Iwa-take, is a lichen of the genus Umbilicaria that grows on rocks.

== Morphology ==
Two different types of polysaccharides are known to be the structural components, both a heteroglycan from the fungus and a glucan from the alga. U. esculenta lichens have a thallus attached to the substrate with a central holdfast. The thallus is also heteromerous (parts that are different in quality and number) and fully corticated (has a cortex and bark). Many of the Umbilicaria species are characterized by a veined or rugose thalline surface.

== Ecology ==
Umbilicaria esculenta is a saxicolous lichen; it grows on rocks and is known widely as the "rock tripe". It is usually found on at high altitude in East Asia.

== Human uses ==
U. esculenta is considered a delicacy in China, Korea, and Japan where it is eaten in dishes, soups, or in salads.

It has been used as starvation food by Native Americans and early settlers.

== Gallery ==
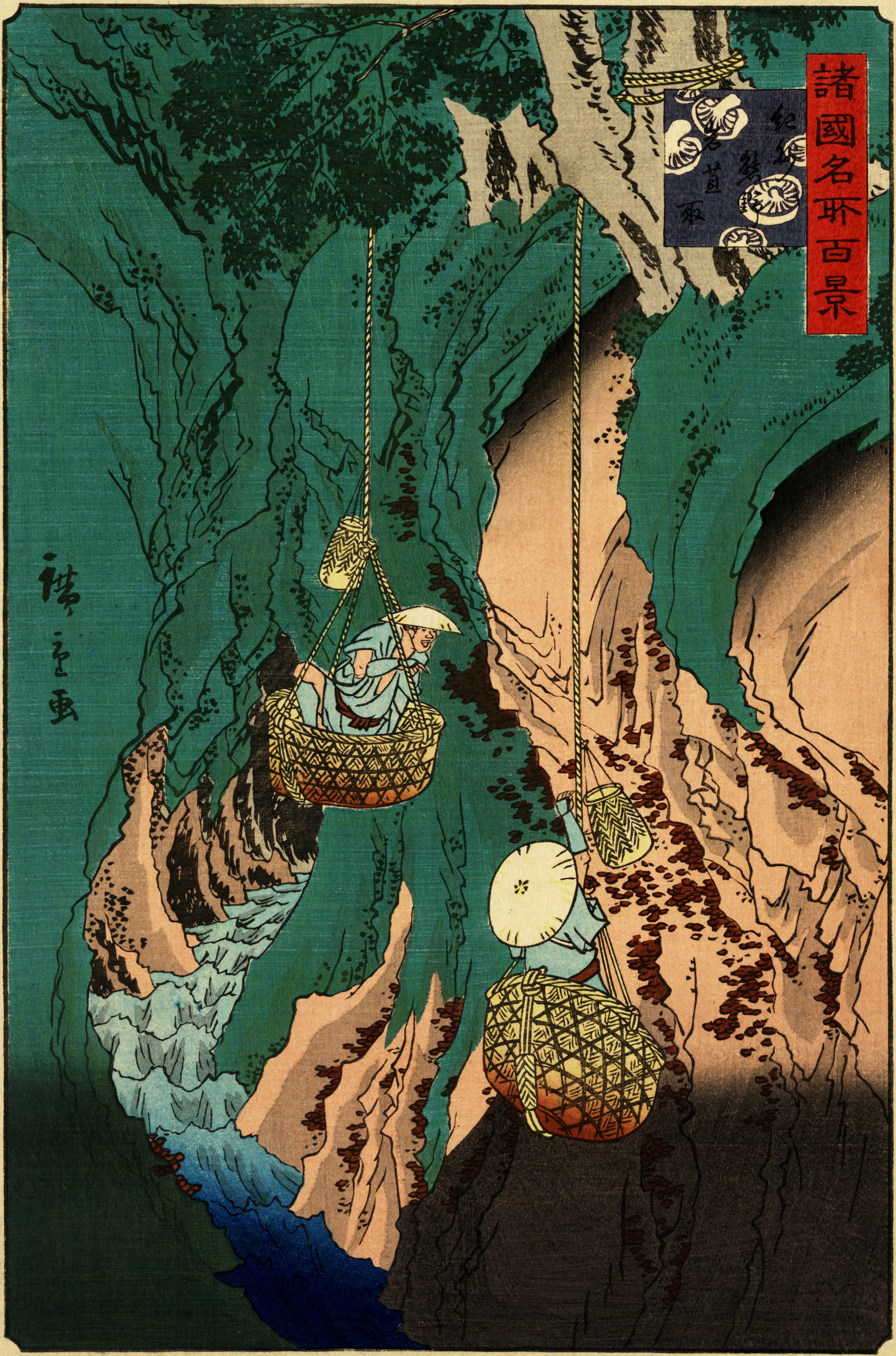
Iwatake gathering at Kumano in Kishū, by Hiroshige II

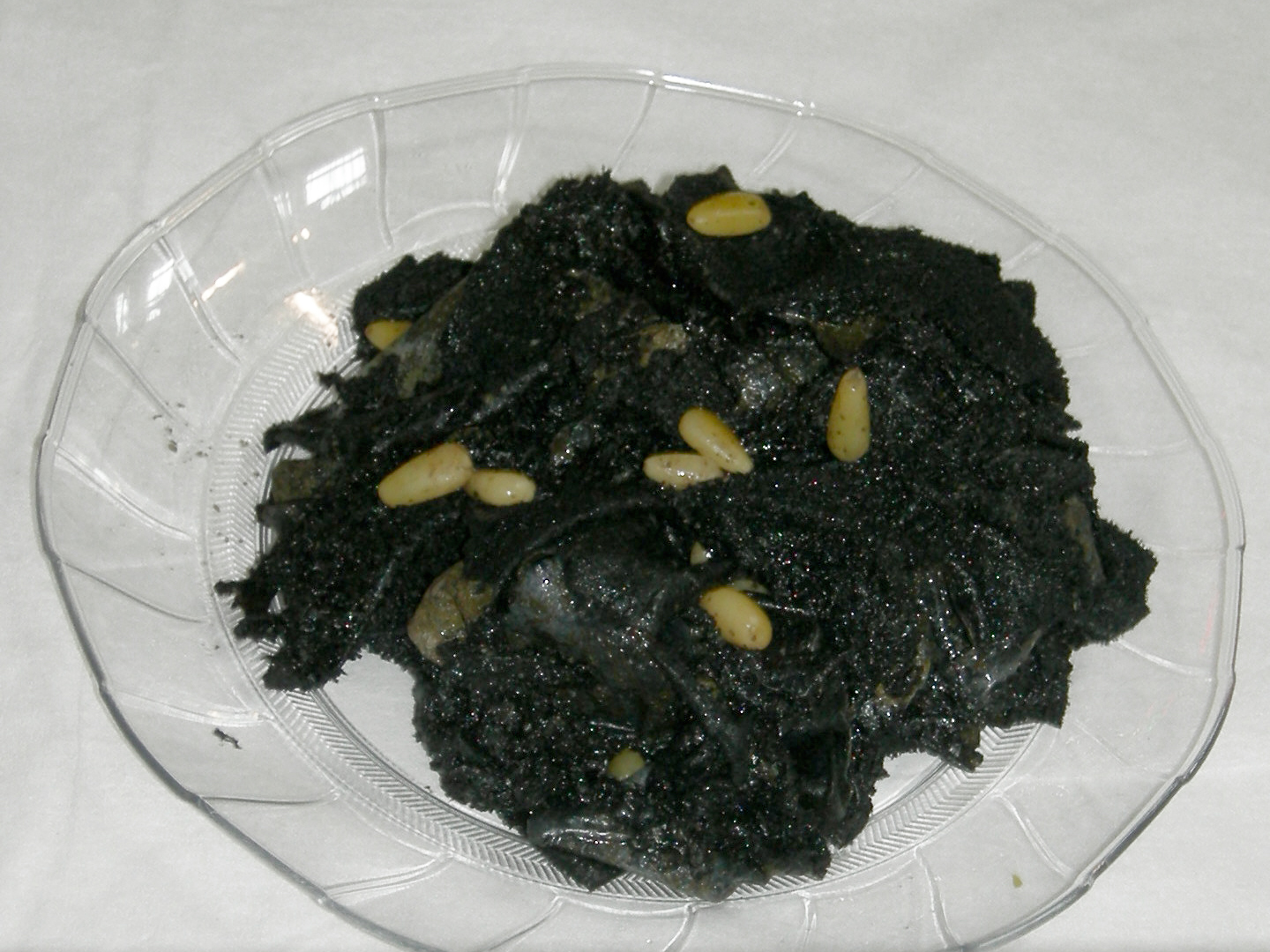
Korean pan-fried Umbilicaria esculenta
