= Dasik =

Korean confectionary

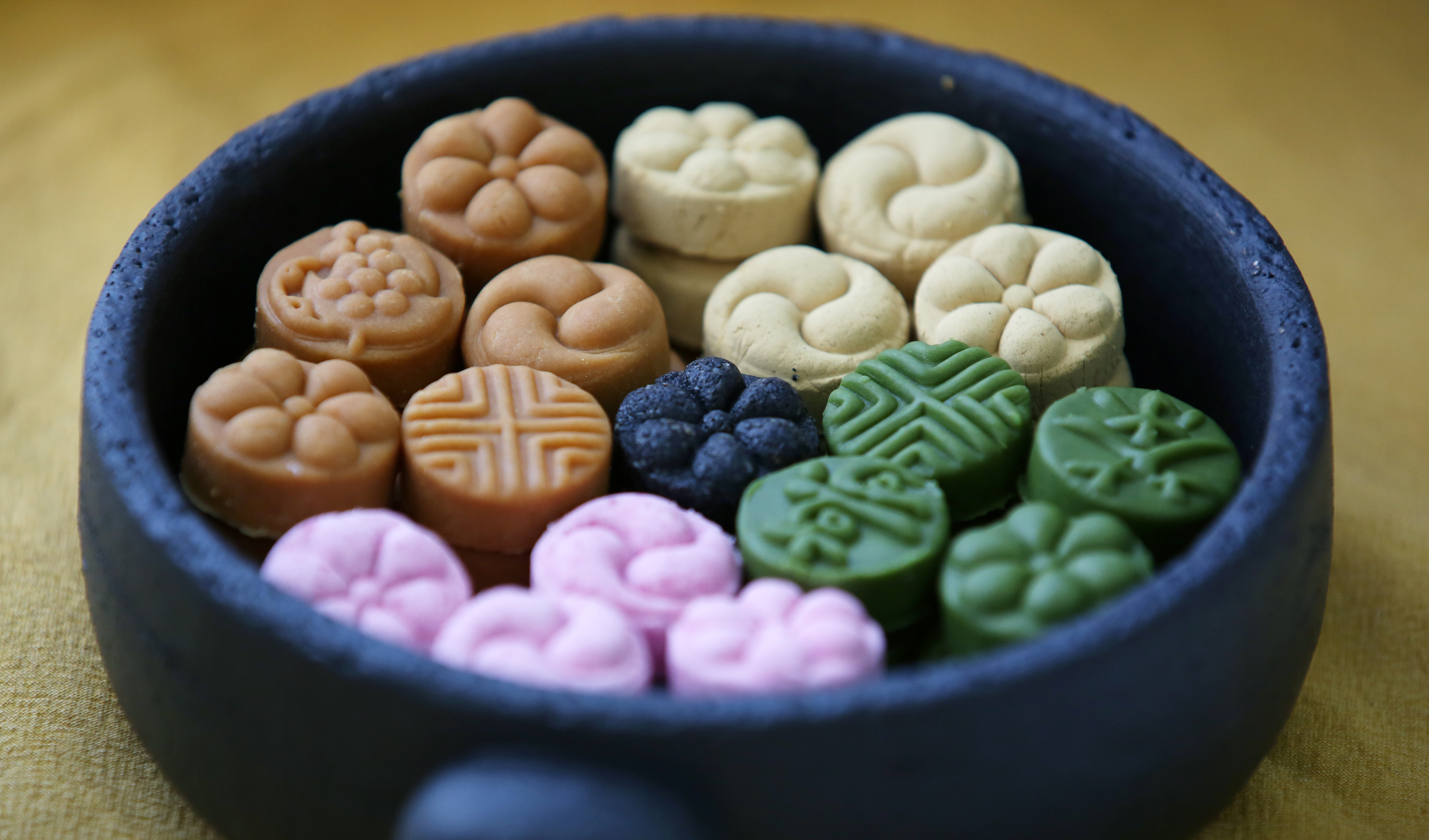
- Type: Hangwa
- Course: Dessert
- Place of origin: Korea
- Main ingredients: grain or other edible seed flour or pollen, and honey

Korean name
- Hangul: 다식
- Hanja: 茶食
- Lit.: tea food
- RR: dasik
- MR: tasik
- IPA: taɕik̚

Dasik (Korean: 다식; pronounced [taɕik̚]; lit. tea food) is a bite-size traditional Korean snack food (hangwa) that is normally accompanied by tea. It can be made by kneading grain or other edible seed flour or pollen with honey, then pressing them into a decorative mould called dasikpan (다식판). A dasik plate usually consists of an assortment of dasik of different colours, including green, yellow, pink, black, and white. Typical ingredients include: rice flour, pine pollen, black sesame, chestnut, and soybean.

== Varieties ==
- bam dasik (밤다식) – made of steamed and mashed chestnut, or chestnut powder from finely sliced and sun-dried chestnuts
- geomeunkkae dasik (검은깨다식) – made of toasted black sesame seed powder
- kkae dasik (깨다식) – made of toasted sesame seed powder
- kong dasik (콩다식) – made of steamed and pounded yellow soybean
- pureunkong dasik (푸른콩다식) – made of steamed and pounded green soybean
- songhwa dasik (송화다식) – made of pine pollen
- ssal dasik (쌀다식) – made of steamed, dried, toasted, and then pounded glutinous rice flour

== Origin ==
Dasik is a food that was introduced to Korea from China during the Song dynasty in China. Dasik became a ceremonial food for weddings during the Joseon period.

== Dasikpan ==
Dasik is shaped with a wooden or porcelain press that forms a patterned confectionery. The press is engraved with a design that forms an embossed pattern on the dasik piece. The design would symbolize the family's name in order to wish for a long life or for a special event, like hwangap or 60th birthday or weddings. Press the dough into a dasikpan that has letters, flowers or a geometric pattern is embossed. The surface of dasik has letters, flower patterns, or Chinese letters 壽·福·康·寧 representing long life, luck, health and peacefulness. Two dasikpan forms one set. Its length is 30–60 cm, width is 5–6 cm, and thickness is 2–3 cm.

== See also ==
- Bánh đậu xanh
