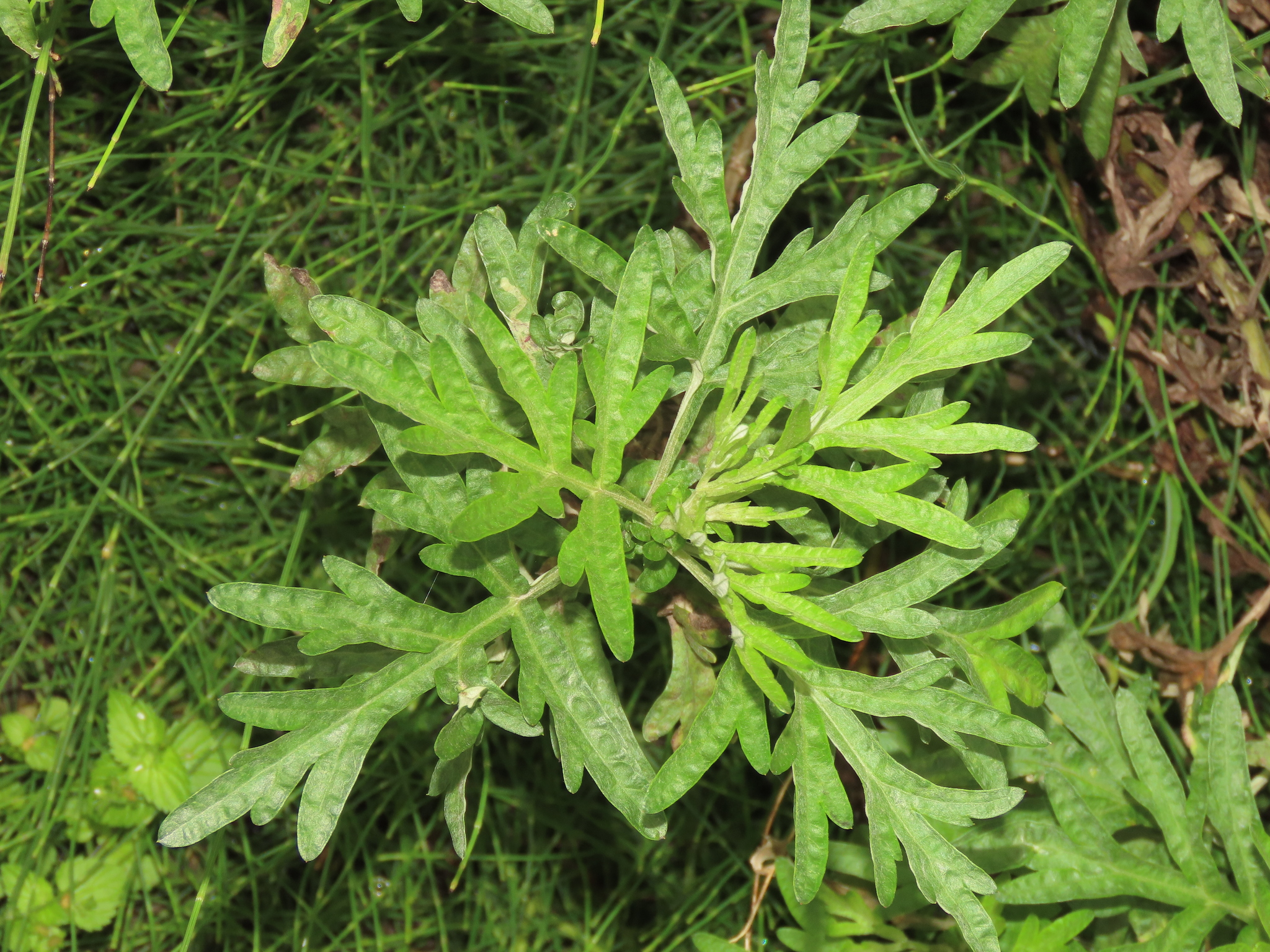

Scientific classification
- Kingdom: Plantae
- Clade: Embryophytes
- Clade: Tracheophytes
- Clade: Spermatophytes
- Clade: Angiosperms
- Clade: Eudicots
- Clade: Asterids
- Order: Asterales
- Family: Asteraceae
- Genus: Artemisia
- Species: A. indica

Binomial name
- Artemisia indica Willd.

Synonyms
- List: Absinthium moxa Besser; Artemisia asiatica Nakai ex Pamp.; Artemisia discolor var. glandulifera L.F.Hend.; Artemisia dubia var. grata (Wall. ex Besser) Pamp.; Artemisia dubia f. grata (Wall. ex Besser) Pamp.; Artemisia dubia var. orientalis Pamp.; Artemisia elegantissima Pamp.; Artemisia elegantissima var. kumaonensis Pamp.; Artemisia flodmanii Rydb.; Artemisia grata Wall. ex Besser; Artemisia indica var. orientalis (Pamp.) H.Hara; Artemisia leptophylla D.Don; Artemisia leptostachya DC.; Artemisia longiflora Pamp.; Artemisia momiyamae Kitam.; Artemisia princeps var. orientalis H.Hara; Artemisia vulgaris var. flodmanii (Rydb.) M.Peck; Artemisia vulgaris subsp. flodmanii (Rydb.) H.M.Hall & Clem.; Artemisia vulgaris var. glandulifera (L.F.Hend.) M.Peck; Artemisia vulgaris var. indica (Willd.) Hassk.; Artemisia vulgaris var. vulgatissima Besser; Artemisia wallichiana Besser

= Artemisia indica =

Species of flowering plant

Artemisia indica, the Indian wormwood, is a widespread species of flowering plant in the family Asteraceae. It is native to the Indian Subcontinent (except Bangladesh), mainland Southeast Asia, China (except Xinjiang and Qinghai), Taiwan, the Philippines, Korea, the Ryukyu Islands, and Japan, and it has been introduced to Peninsular Malaysia. In the wild it is typically found alongside roads, on slopes, in forest edges, and in scrublands at elevations below 2,000 m (6,600 ft).

== Subtaxa ==
The following varieties are accepted:

- Artemisia indica var. dissecta Pamp. – Assam
- Artemisia indica var. elegantissima (Pamp.) Y.R.Ling & Humphries – northern Pakistan, western Himalayas, southeastern Tibet
- Artemisia indica var. indica – entire range
- Artemisia indica var. kumaonensis (Pamp.) Karthik. & Moorthy – western Himalayas
- Artemisia indica var. momiyamae (Kitam.) H.Hara – Honshu
