= Manabu Miyoshi =

Japanese botanist

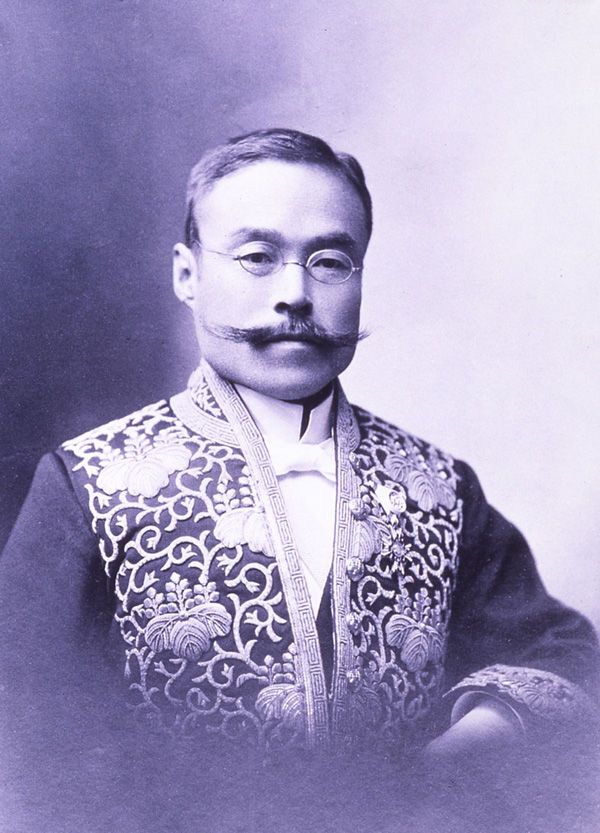
- M. Miyoshi, between 1895 and 1923
- Born: December 2, 1874; Ena, Gifu
- Died: May 11, 1939 (aged 78)
- Resting place: Tama Cemetery
- Education: Imperial University of Tokyo; University of Leipzig
- Scientific career
- Fields: Botany
- Workplaces: Imperial University of Tokyo
- Doctoral advisor: Wilhelm Friedrich Philipp Pfeffer
- Author abbrev. (botany): Miyoshi

Manabu Miyoshi (三好 学, Miyoshi Manabu; January 4, 1861 – May 11, 1939) was a Japanese botanist.

== Biography ==
Miyoshi was born in 1861 in the village of Iwamura, now part of modern-day Ena. He was born into a samurai family from the former province of Mino. A graduate of the Imperial University of Tokyo in 1889, he continued his scientific training at the University of Leipzig under the direction of German botanist Wilhelm Friedrich Philipp Pfeffer. In 1895, he earned his Doctorate of Science degree and returned to Japan as Professor of Botany at the University of Tokyo.

He entered the Imperial Academy of Japan in 1920.

Throughout his academic career, he studied the genera Prunus and Iris. At the beginning of the 20th century, he promoted the idea of ‘natural monuments’ for preservation, a concept he brought back with him from his period of study in Germany.

== Awards ==
- 1917: Order of the Sacred Treasure, 2nd class.

== Selected publications ==
- Miyoshi, Manabu, ed. (1905–1914). Atlas of Japanese Vegetation: Phototype Reproductions of Photographs of Wild and Cultivated Plants as Well as the Plant-Landscapes of Japan, with Explanatory Text. Tokyo: The Maruzen Kabushiki Kaisha (Z.P. Maruya & Co., Ltd.). 15 sets.
- Miyoshi, Manabu (1921). HANA SHOBU ZUFU - Irises. Tokyo: Unsôdô. 4 vols., each 8 3/4" X 17 3/16" with a total of 100 full page color woodblock prints of Japanese irises, along with 5 pages of color samples. In addition, there is a 40pp. letterpress text volume (6 1/4" X 8 7/8"). Printed by color woodblock. Published in a clasped chitsu case. Produced in Kyoto with Japanese bookbinding (YAMATO TONI) and published on 15 Oct 1921.
- Miyoshi, Manabu (1921). ŌKA GAISETSU - Cherry blossoms. Tokyo: Unsôdô. 2 vols., with a total of 100 full page color woodblock prints. Woodblock carving by Yuji Otsuka. Printing by Sanjiro Matsui using color woodblock printer. Published in a clasped chitsu case. Printed in Tokyo 10 May 1921, produced with Japanese bookbinding (YAMATO TONI), and published on 15 May 1921. 100 were printed initially and sold out. Maruzen sold them outside Japan. A second printing of 100 were lost in the Great Kanto Earthquake, as were the wood blocks and the offices of Unsôdô in Tokyo.
- Miyoshi, Manabu (1935). Sakura Japanese Cherry - Tourist Library 3. Tokyo: Japanese Government Railways.
