= Perennial vegetable =

Type of vegetable

Perennial vegetables are vegetables that can live for more than two years.

Some well known perennial vegetables from the temperate regions of the world include asparagus, artichoke and rhubarb. In the tropics, cassava and taro are grown as vegetables, and these plants can live many years. Some perennial plants are cultivated as annuals in order to minimise pest pressure (e.g., potato, Solanum tuberosum).

Perennial vegetables are an integral part of many cultural diets around the world, particularly in tropical agriculture. In contrast, temperate Eurasian cultures have relied on annual cereals (oats, barley, wheat) as dietary staples since antiquity. Some examples of older temperate varieties include: seakale, skirret, sorrel, and Good King Henry.

== List ==
- Abelmoschus manihot, edible hibiscus
- Allium ampeloprasum, perennial leek
- Allium cepa aggregatum, potato onion
- Allium fistulosum, the Welsh onion, a perennial scallion
- Allium × proliferum, tree onion or walking onion
- Allium schoenoprasum, chives
- Aralia cordata, udo
- Arracacia xanthorrhiza, arracacha
- Artocarpus altilis, breadfruit
- Asparagus officinalis, asparagus
- Atriplex halimus, saltbush
- Basella alba, Malabar spinach
- Beta vulgaris maritima, sea beet
- Blitum bonus-henricus, Good King Henry
- Brassica oleracea acephala varieties, tree collards or tree kale
- Brassica oleracea alboglabra, kai-lan
- Bunias orientalis, Turkish rocket
- Camassia spp., camas
- Canna edulis, achira
- Capparis spinosa, capers
- Capsicum baccatum, aji amarillo
- Capsicum pubescens, manzano chile
- Carica papaya, papaya
- Cicorium intybus, chicory
- Cnidoscolus chayamansa, chaya
- Coccinia grandis, ivy gourd or perennial cucumber
- Colocasia esculenta, taro
- Crambe maritima, sea kale
- Cynara cardunculus, cardoon
- Cynara scolymus, artichoke
- Dioscorea bulbifera, air potato
- Helianthus tuberosus, Jerusalem artichoke
- Ipomoea batatas, sweet potato
- Lablab purpureus, hyacinth bean
- Manihot esculenta, cassava
- Nasturtium officinale, water cress
- Nelumbo nucifera, lotus
- Oxalis tuberosa, oca
- Phaseolus coccineus, runner bean
- Plantago coronopus, minutina
- Rheum rhabarbarum, rhubarb
- Rumex acetosa, sorrel
- Rumex scutatus, shield-leaf sorrel
- Sauropus androgynus, katuk
- Scorzonera hispanica, black salsify
- Sium sisarum, skirret
- Smallanthus sonchifolius, yacón
- Stachys affinis, crosne
- Suaeda pulvinata, seepweed
- Toona sinensis, fragrant spring tree or xiāngchūn
- Vasconcellea × heilbornii, babaco papaya

== See also ==
- Leaf vegetable
- Root vegetable
- Breadfruit is an example of a tree fruit that is perennial, and is used as a vegetable
- Perennial (disambiguation)
