= Baechu-kimchi =

Korean staple dish

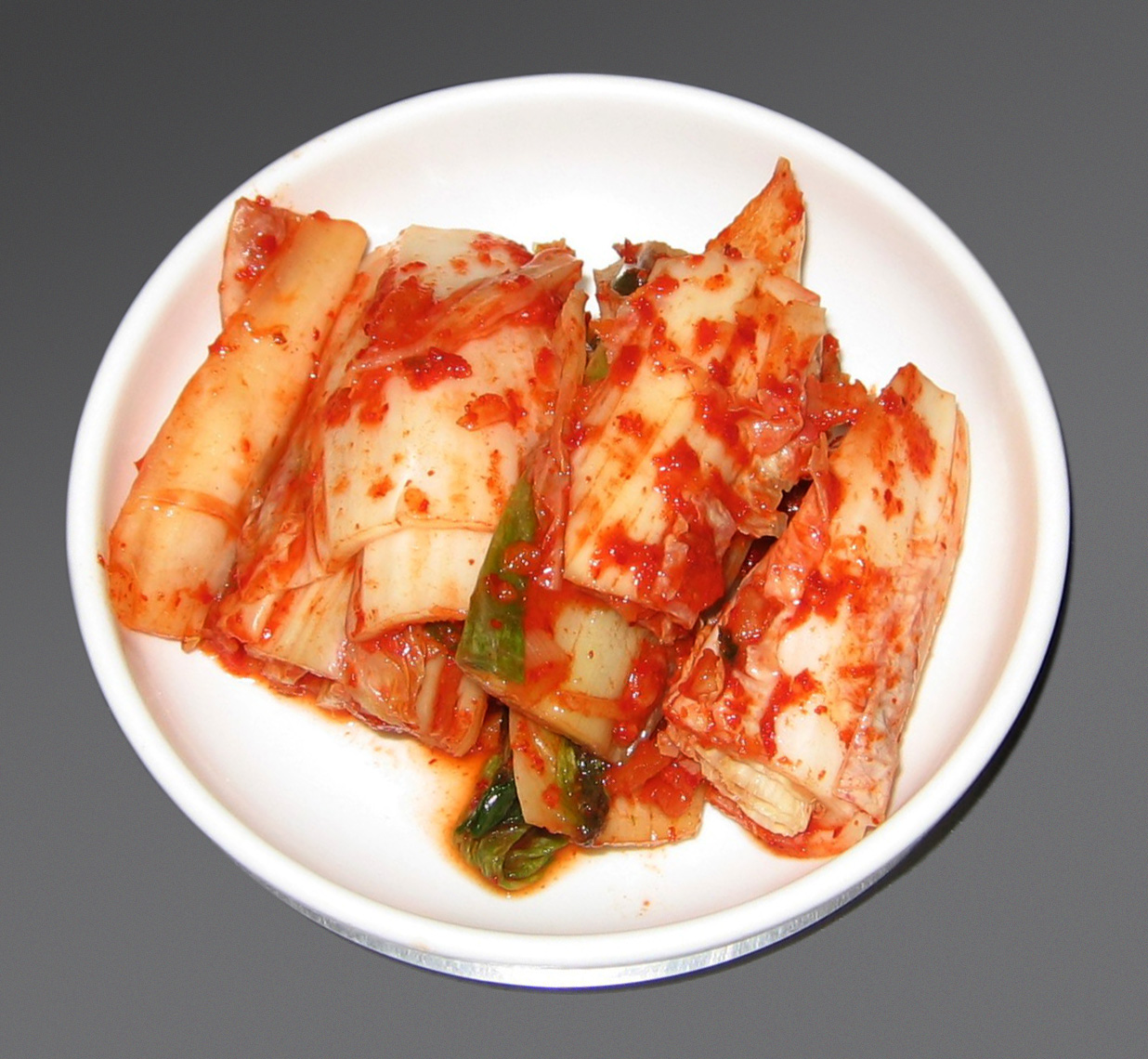
- Type: Kimchi
- Course: Banchan (side dish)
- Place of origin: Korea
- Associated cuisine: Korean cuisine
- Cooking time: 5 hours
- Serving temperature: 4–10 °C (39–50 °F)
- Main ingredients: Napa cabbage
- Food energy (per 50g serving): 19 kcal (79 kJ)

Korean name
- Hangul: 배추김치
- RR: baechugimchi
- MR: paech'ugimch'i
- IPA: pɛ.tɕʰu.ɡim.tɕʰi

Baechu-kimchi (Korean: 배추김치), translated as napa cabbage kimchi or simply kimchi, is a quintessential banchan (side dish) in Korean cuisine, made with salted, seasoned, and fermented napa cabbage.

== Preparation ==
Baechu-kimchi is made by fermenting salted napa cabbage with Korean radish, aromatic vegetables, jeotgal (salted seafood), gochugaru (chili powder) and various seasonings. Northern varieties are milder and soupier. Southern varieties are saltier and more pungent.

=== Cabbages ===
Korean brining salt, which has a larger grain size compared to common kitchen salt, is used for the initial salting of the napa cabbage. Being minimally processed, it helps develop flavors in fermented foods. Per 100 grams (3.5 oz) water, around 2 grams (0.071 oz) of salt is used. Half of the salt is dissolved in water before putting the cabbage in, and the other half is sprinkled in between the layers of napa cabbage that were washed, trimmed, and halved or quartered lengthwise. The cabbage is salted in the brine for several hours, turned over, then salted for more hours. After that, the salted cabbage is washed thoroughly under running water and drained.

=== Fillings ===
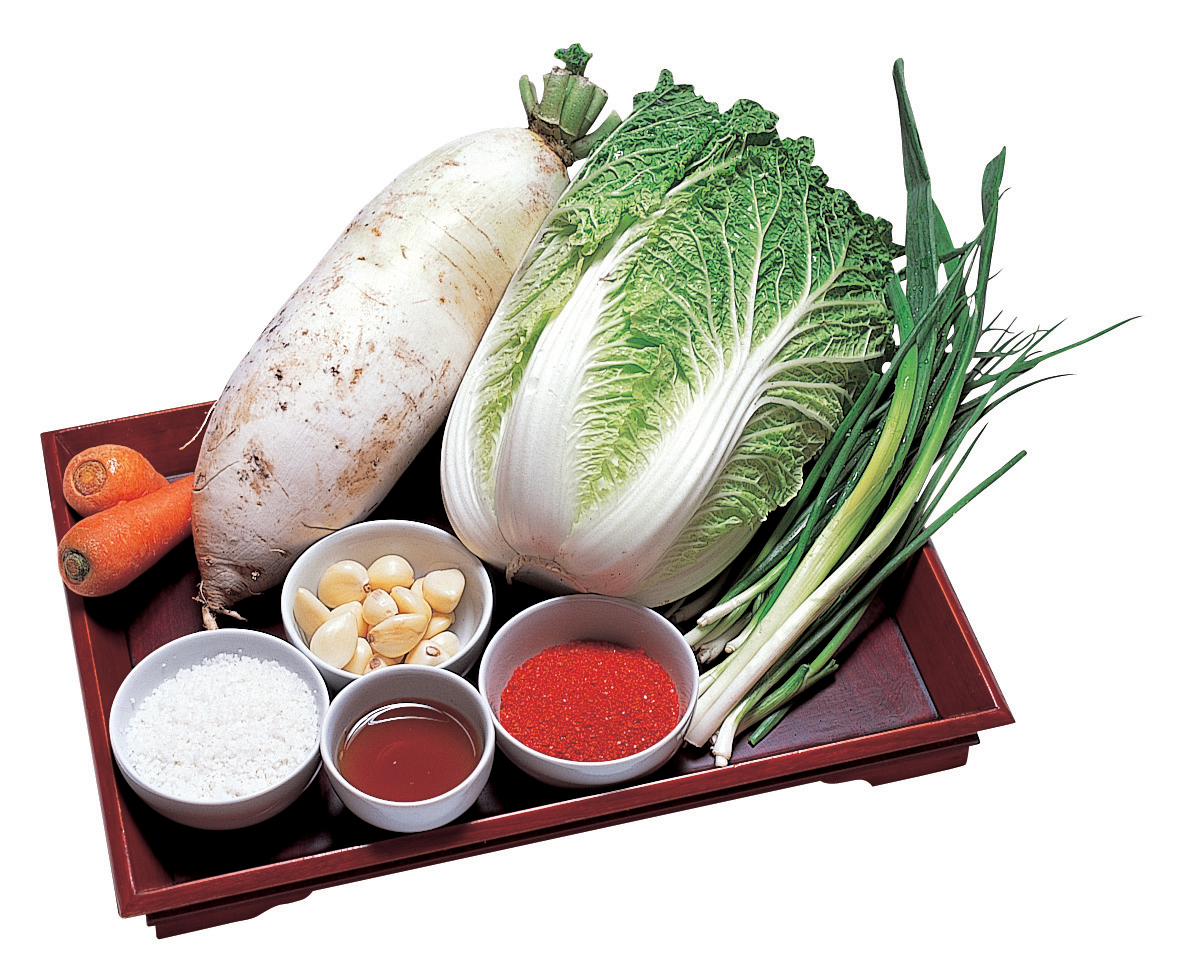
Kimchi ingredients (cabbage, radish, scallions, carrots, garlic, salt, fish sauce, and chili powder)

Porridge-like thin paste is made by boiling small amount of glutinous rice flour in water. To that, gochugaru, jeotgal, Korean radish, and aromatic vegetables are added to make the kimchi seasoning.

Scallions, minced garlic, and ground ginger are the most commonly used aromatic vegetables, and garlic chives, Korean parsley, onions, carrots, and chili peppers are also often added. Korean radish is typically julienned, and the aromatics can be chopped, minced, or ground.

Jeotgal can be replaced with raw seafood in colder northern parts of the Korean Peninsula. If used, milder saeu-jeot (salted shrimp) or jogi-jeot (salted croaker) is preferred and the amount of jeotgal is also reduced in Northern and Central regions. In Southern Korea, a generous amount of stronger myeolchi-jeot (salted anchovies) and galchi-jeot (salted hairtail) is commonly used. Raw seafood or daegu-agami-jeot (salted cod gills) are used in the east coast areas. The most commonly used aekjeot (liquid jeotgal, or fish sauce) are myeolchi-aekjeot (anchovy sauce) and kkanari-aekjeot (sand lance sauce). Aekjeot may be used in place of solid jeotgal or used along with them. Small amounts of sugar, honey, fruit juice, or ground fruit can also be added.

The fillings are packed between each leaf of the cabbage.

=== Fermentation ===
Kimchi is placed in an onggi (earthenware) or other container, covered, and pressed down, and let ferment at room temperature for a day or two. Traditionally, kimchi is stored underground in onggi. Today, it is more commonly stored in a kimchi refrigerator or a regular refrigerator.

== See also ==
- Gimjang
- Kkakdugi
