= Thermal mass refrigerator =

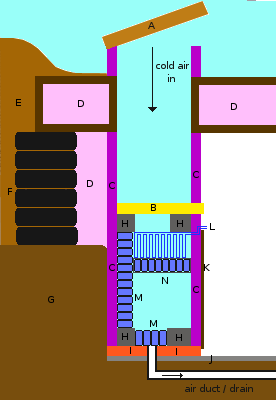
Thermal mass refrigerator

A thermal mass refrigerator is a refrigerator that is foreseen with thermal mass as well as insulation to decrease the energy use of the refrigerator.

A particularly popular thermal mass refrigerator was conceived by Michael Reynolds and detailed in his 1993 book Earthship Volume 3. This refrigerator was a DIY refrigerator designed around a (Sun-Frost) DC refrigeration unit run on P.V. panels.

== Design ==
The thermal mass used in Michael Reynolds' design is a combination of a liquid (i.e. water or beer) together with concrete mass. Concrete's temperature can be decreased quickly, while a liquid's (such as beer or water) with its higher thermal mass requires more energy to change temperature, holding the cold for longer. In Michael Reynolds' design, the liquid is added in the form of beer cans, placed in the back of the refrigerator.

Besides the use of a large quantity of thermal mass, he also made sure that the inside of the box could be in direct contact with the outside air, so as to allow the unit to be cooled without electricity/compressor-assistance during winter. This is done by having the top of the unit openable by placing a skylight on top. A pipe connects the bottom to the outside as well, so as to allow natural circulation of air. The inflow of outside air from the top could be closed off by closing the skylight as well as by closing the removable insulated damper.

== See also ==
- Kimchi refrigerator
