= L. perennis =

L. perennis may refer to:

- Lactuca perennis, the blue lettuce or perennial lettuce, a plant species present in most of the Central and Southern Europe
- Lupinus perennis, the Indian beet, old maid's bonnets, blue lupine or sundial lupine, a plant species widespread in the eastern part of the United States

== See also ==
- Perennis (disambiguation)
