= Kimchi =

Korean side dish of fermented vegetables

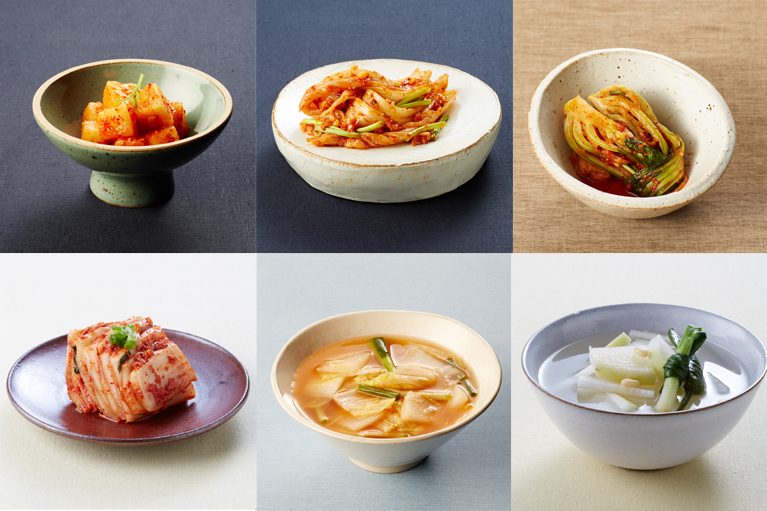
- Clockwise from top left: kkakdugi, pa-kimchi, yeolmu-kimchi, dongchimi, nabak-kimchi, mul-kimchi
- Course: Banchan
- Place of origin: Korea
- Associated cuisine: Korean
- Serving temperature: Cold or at room temperature
- Main ingredients: Various vegetables including napa cabbage and Korean radish
- Ingredients generally used: Chili
- Variations: Baechu-kimchi, baek-kimchi, dongchimi, kkakdugi, nabak-kimchi, pa-kimchi, yeolmu-kimchi, morkovcha

Korean name
- Hangul: 김치
- RR: gimchi
- MR: kimch'i
- IPA: [kim.tɕʰi]

Kimchi (/ˈkɪmtʃi/; Korean: 김치; pronounced [kim.tɕʰi]) (Note: Romanized in different languages/romanization systems as gimchi, gimchee, kimuchi, or kimchee) is a traditional Korean side dish (banchan) consisting of salted and fermented vegetables, most often Chinese cabbage or Korean radish. A wide selection of seasonings are used, including gochugaru (Korean chili powder), spring onions, garlic, ginger, and jeotgal (salted seafood). Kimchi is also used in a variety of soups and stews. Kimchi is a staple food in Korean cuisine and is eaten as a side dish with almost every Korean meal.

There are hundreds of different types of kimchi made with different vegetables as the main ingredients. Examples of variants include baechu-kimchi, kkakdugi, chonggak-kimchi, and oi-sobagi. Traditionally, winter kimchi, called gimjang, was stored in large earthenware fermentation vessels, called onggi, in the ground to prevent freezing during the winter months and to keep it cool enough to slow down the fermentation process during summer months. The process of making kimchi was called gimjang and was based on participation by the whole village. The vessels are also kept outdoors in special terraces called jangdokdae. The use of household kimchi refrigerators has become a more common method for keeping fermenting kimchi at the right temperature.

Kimchi has gained international recognition as a traditional Korean food and has been promoted as part of Korean cultural heritage. Its preparation methods and cultural significance have been documented as part of Korea's intangible cultural heritage.

== Etymology ==
=== Ji ===
The term ji (지), which has its origins in archaic Korean dihi (디히), has been used to refer to kimchi since ancient times. The sound change can be roughly described as:

- dihi (디히) → di (디) → ji (지)

The Middle Korean form dihi is found in several books from the Joseon period (1392–1897). In Modern Korean, the word remains as the suffix -ji in the standard language (as in jjanji, seokbak-ji), and as the suffix -ji as well as the noun ji in Gyeongsang and Jeolla dialects. The unpalatalized form di is preserved in P'yŏngan dialect.

=== Kimchi ===
Kimchi (김치) is the accepted word in both North and South Korean standard languages. Earlier forms of the word include thimchoy (팀ᄎᆡ), a Middle Korean transcription of the Sino-Korean word 沈菜 (literally "submerged vegetable"). Thimchoy appears in Sohak Eonhae, the 16th-century Korean rendition of the Chinese book, Xiaoxue. Sound changes from Middle Korean to Modern Korean regarding the word can be described as:

- thimchoy (팀ᄎᆡ; 沈菜) → timchoy (딤ᄎᆡ) → cimchoy (짐ᄎᆡ) → cimchuy (짐츼) → kimchi (김치)

The aspirated first consonant of thimchoy became unaspirated in timchoy, then underwent palatalization in cimchoy. The word then became cimchuy with the loss of the vowel o (ㆍ) in Korean language, then kimchi, with the depalatalized word-initial consonant. In Modern Korean, the hanja characters 沈菜 are pronounced chimchae (침채), and are not used to refer to kimchi, or anything else. The word kimchi is not considered as a Sino-Korean word. Older forms of the word are retained in many regional dialects: jimchae (Jeolla, Hamgyŏng dialects), jimchi (Chungcheong, Gangwon, Gyeonggi, Gyeongsang, Hamgyŏng, Jeolla dialects), and dimchi (P'yŏngan dialect).

== History ==
=== Early history ===
Samguk Sagi, a historical record of the Three Kingdoms of Korea, mentions the pickle jar used to ferment vegetables, which indicates that fermented vegetables were commonly eaten during this time. Attributed to the earliest kimchi, the Goguryeo people were skilled at fermenting and widely consumed fermented food. During the Silla dynasty (57 BCE – CE 935), kimchi became prevalent as Buddhism caught on throughout the nation and fostered a vegetarian lifestyle.

The pickling of vegetables was an ideal method, prior to refrigerators, that helped to preserve the lifespan of foods. In Korea, kimchi was made during the winter by fermenting vegetables, and burying them in the ground in traditional brown ceramic pots called onggi. This labor further allowed a bonding among women within the family. A poem on Korean radish written by Yi Gyubo, a 13th-century literatus, shows that radish kimchi was common in Goryeo (918–1392).

Pickled radish slices make a good summer side dish,
Radish preserved in salt is a winter side dish from start to end.
The roots in the earth grow plumper every day,
Harvesting after the frost, a slice cut by a knife tastes like a pear.

— Yi Gyubo, Donggukisanggukjip (translated by Michael J. Pettid, in Korean cuisine: An Illustrated History)

Kimchi has been a staple in Korean culture, but historical versions were not a spicy dish. Early records of kimchi do not mention garlic or chili pepper. Chili peppers, now a standard ingredient in kimchi, had been unknown in Korea until the early seventeenth century due to it being a New World crop. Chili peppers, originally native to the Americas, were introduced to East Asia by Portuguese traders. The first mention of chili pepper is found in Jibong yuseol, an encyclopedia published in 1614. Sallim gyeongje, a 17‒18th century book on farm management, wrote on kimchi with chili peppers. However, it was not until the 19th century that the use of chili peppers in kimchi became widespread. Recipes from the early 19th century closely resemble today's kimchi.

A 1766 book, Jeungbo sallim gyeongje, reports kimchi varieties made with myriad ingredients, including chonggak-kimchi (kimchi made with chonggak radish), oi-sobagi (with cucumber), seokbak-ji (with jogi-jeot), and dongchimi. However, napa cabbage was introduced to Korea only at the end of 19th century, and whole-cabbage kimchi similar to its current form is described in Siuijeonseo, a cookbook published around that time.

=== Modern history ===
During South Korea's involvement in the Vietnam War, the industrialization and commercialization of kimchi production became increasingly important because the Korean government wanted to provide rations for its troops. The Korean government requested American help to ensure that South Korean troops, reportedly "desperate" for the food, could obtain it in the field.

In 2008, South Korean scientists created a special low-calorie, vitamin-rich "space kimchi" for Yi So-yeon, the first Korean astronaut, to take to space. It was bacteria-free, unlike normal kimchi in which bacteria are essential for fermentation. It was feared that cosmic rays might mutate the bacteria.

South Korea developed programs for adult Korean adoptees to return to South Korea and learn about what it means to be Korean. One of these programs was learning how to make kimchi.

==== 1996 kimchi standard dispute with Japan ====
In 1996, Korea protested against Japanese commercial production of kimchi arguing that the Japanese-produced product (kimuchi, キムチ) was different from kimchi. In particular, Japanese kimchi was not fermented and was more similar to asazuke. Korea lobbied for an international standard from the Codex Alimentarius, an organization associated with the World Health Organization that defines voluntary standards for food preparation for international trade purposes. In 2001, the Codex Alimentarius published a voluntary standard defining kimchi as "a fermented food that uses salted napa cabbages as its main ingredient mixed with seasonings, and goes through a lactic acid production process at a low temperature", but which neither specified a minimum amount of fermentation nor forbade the use of any additives. Following the inclusion of the kimchi standard, kimchi exports in Korea did increase, but so did the production of kimchi in China and the import of Chinese kimchi into Korea.

==== 2010 kimchi ingredient price crisis ====
Due to heavy rainfall shortening the harvesting time for cabbage and other main ingredients for kimchi in 2010, the price of kimchi ingredients and kimchi itself rose greatly. Korean and international newspapers described the rise in prices as a national crisis. Some restaurants stopped offering kimchi as a free side dish, which The New York Times compared to an American hamburger restaurant no longer offering free ketchup. In response to the kimchi price crisis, the South Korean government announced the temporary reduction of tariffs on imported cabbage to coincide with the kimjang season.

==== Intangible Cultural Heritage of Humanity ====
Kimchi-related items have been inscribed on UNESCO's Representative List of the Intangible Cultural Heritage of Humanity by both South and North Korea. This makes kimchi the second intangible heritage that was submitted by two countries, the other one being the folk song "Arirang" which was also submitted by both North and South Korea. "The culture of kimjang" was the subject of the Intangible Cultural Heritage: kimchi is not registered by itself.

===== Submitted by South Korea (inscribed 2013) =====
Kimjang, the tradition of making and sharing kimchi that usually takes place in late autumn, was added to the list as "Gimjang, making and sharing kimchi in the Republic of Korea". The practice of Gimjang reaffirms Korean identity and strengthens family cooperation. Gimjang is also an important reminder for many Koreans that human communities need to live in harmony with nature.

===== Submitted by North Korea (inscribed 2015) =====
North Korean kimchi-making was inscribed on the list in December 2015 as "Tradition of kimchi-making in the Democratic People's Republic of Korea". North Korean kimchi tends to be less spicy and less red than South Korean kimchi. Seafood is used less often and less salt is added. Additional sugar is used to help with fermentation in the cold climate.

==== Kimchi Day ====
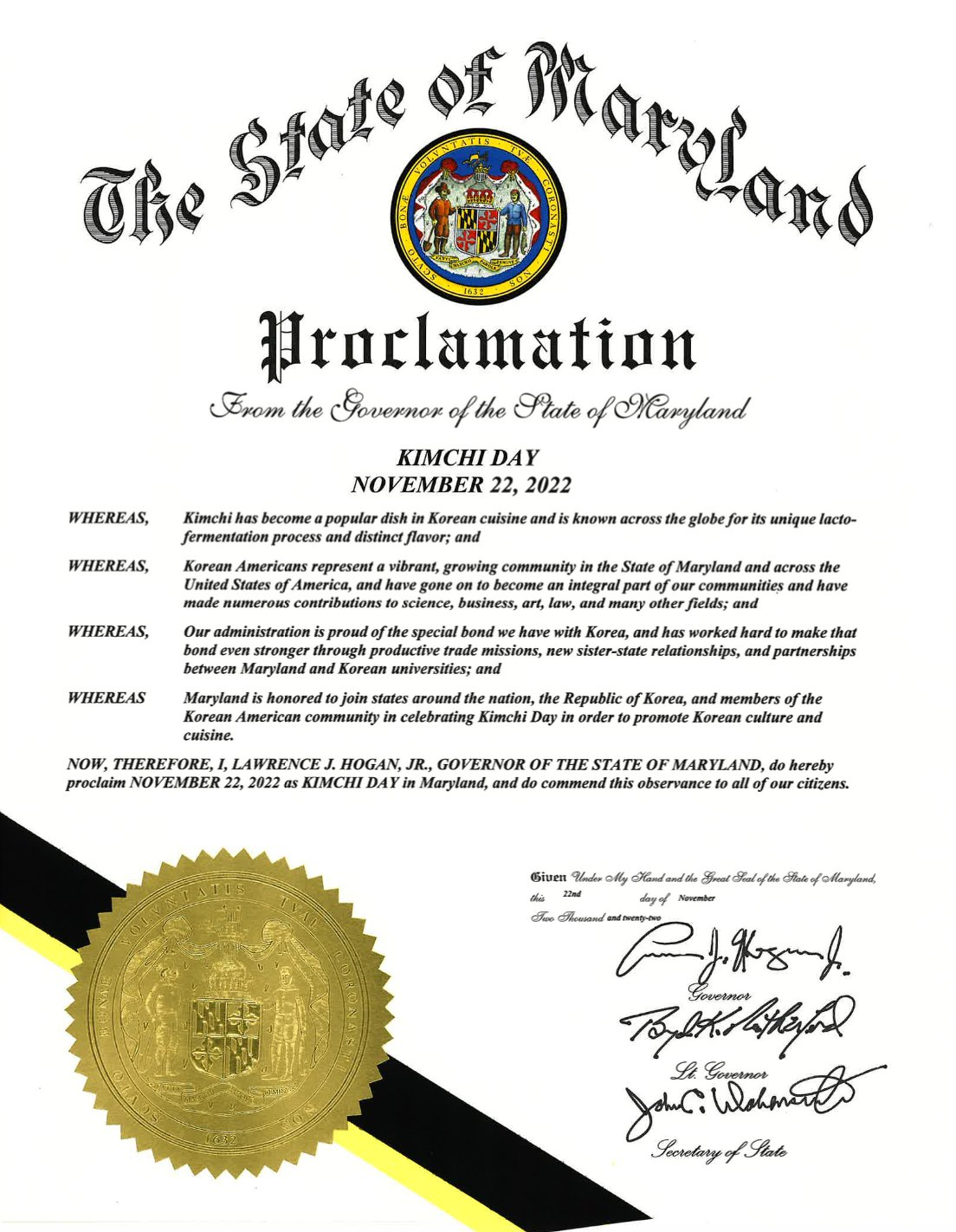
Proclamation signed by Governor of Maryland Larry Hogan declaring 22 November as 'Kimchi Day' (2022)

In the United States, the states California, Virginia, Maryland and New York, and the capital city Washington D.C. have issued proclamations declaring 22 November as 'Kimchi Day' to recognize the importance of the dish as part of Korean culture.

==== 2012 effective ban by China of Korean kimchi imports ====
Since 2012, the Chinese government has effectively banned the import of Korean kimchi through government regulations. Ignoring the standards of kimchi outlined by the Codex Alimentarius, China defined kimchi as a derivative of one of its own cuisines, called pao cai. However, due to significantly different preparation techniques from pao cai, kimchi has significantly more lactic acid bacteria through its fermentation process, which exceeds China's regulations. Since 2012, commercial exports of Korean kimchi to China has reached zero; the only minor amounts of exports accounting for Korean kimchi are exhibition events held in China.

==== 2017 boycott in China ====
A 2017 article in The New York Times said that anti-Korean sentiment in China had risen after South Korea's acceptance of the deployment of THAAD in South Korea. Government-run Chinese news media encouraged the boycott of South Korean goods, and some Chinese nationalists vowed not to eat kimchi. The move was criticized by other Chinese nationalists, who noted that China officially considered Koreans an integral ethnic group in the multinational state, and that kimchi is also indigenous to the Yanbian Korean Autonomous Prefecture.

==== 2020 kimchi ISO standard dispute with China ====
In November 2020, the International Organization for Standardization (ISO) posted ISO 24220:2020, new regulations for the making of pao cai. The same month, BBC News reported that Chinese news organization Global Times claimed the new ISO standard was "an international standard for the kimchi industry led by China" despite the standard clearly stating "this document does not apply to kimchi". This sparked strong anger from South Korean media and people, as well as the responses from some Chinese people who argued China held the right to claim kimchi as their own.

However clarifications from both countries, later revealed that the controversy was triggered over a misunderstanding of a translation of the Chinese word pao cai. After the controversy emerged, Global Times explained it was simply a "misunderstanding in translation", where they had meant to refer to Chinese pao cai, and their Chinese language article had used the term pao cai, but their English language version had "erroneously" translated it as "kimchi", and that the dispute arose from being innocently "lost in translation". They acknowledged that kimchi and pao cai are two different foods, where "Kimchi refers to a kind of fermented cabbage dish that plays an integral role in Korean cuisine, while pàocài, or Sichuan pàocài, refers to pickled vegetables that are popular originally in Southwest China's Sichuan Province, but now in most parts of northern China." Global Times also reported that Baidu Baike, a Chinese online encyclopedia, removed the controversial phrase "Korean kimchi originated from China" after the request.

According to Sojin Lim, co-director of the Institute of Korean Studies of the University of Central Lancashire, Korean kimchi is often called pao cai in China, but China has its own Sichuanese fermented vegetable dish that it also calls pao cai. In 2021, the South Korean Ministry of Culture, Sports and Tourism subsequently presented the guidelines to set the term xīnqí (辛奇) as the new proper Chinese translation of kimchi, while pàocài was no longer the acceptable translation. However, CNN reported that the new Chinese translation of kimchi was unpopular with both Chinese and Korean netizens, and that some Chinese people complained that they do recognize the difference between dishes, but do not like to be told how to translate Kimchi in Chinese. There were also complaints among Koreans that Korea is appropriating their own traditional culture for the Chinese, by trying to promote a Chinese term for Kimchi which does not have an authentic Korean sound.

== Ingredients ==
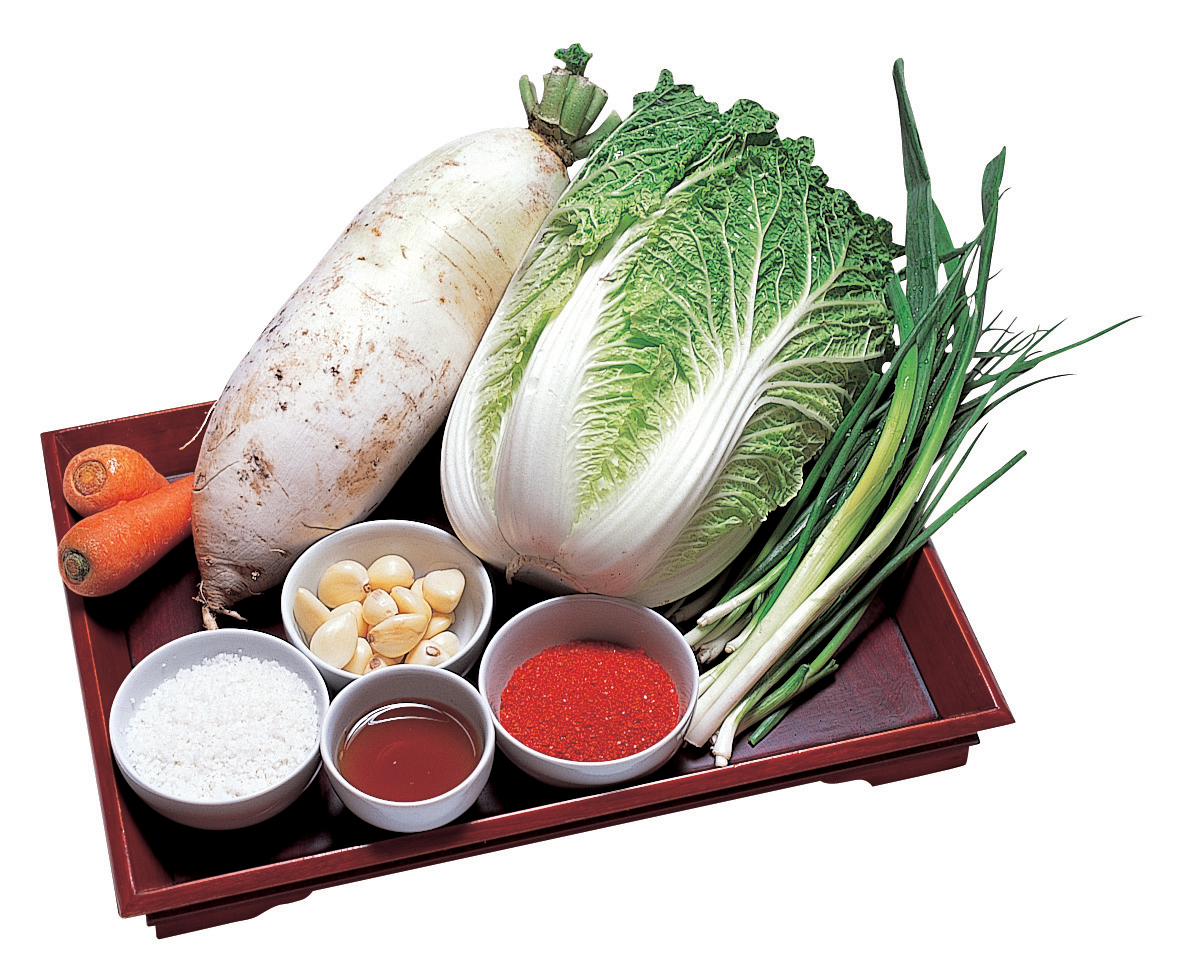
Basic ingredients for kimchi: napa cabbage, radish, carrot, salt, garlic, fish sauce, chili powder and scallions. A sticky, glutinous paste of rice flour is also needed to make the seasoning of the kimchi.

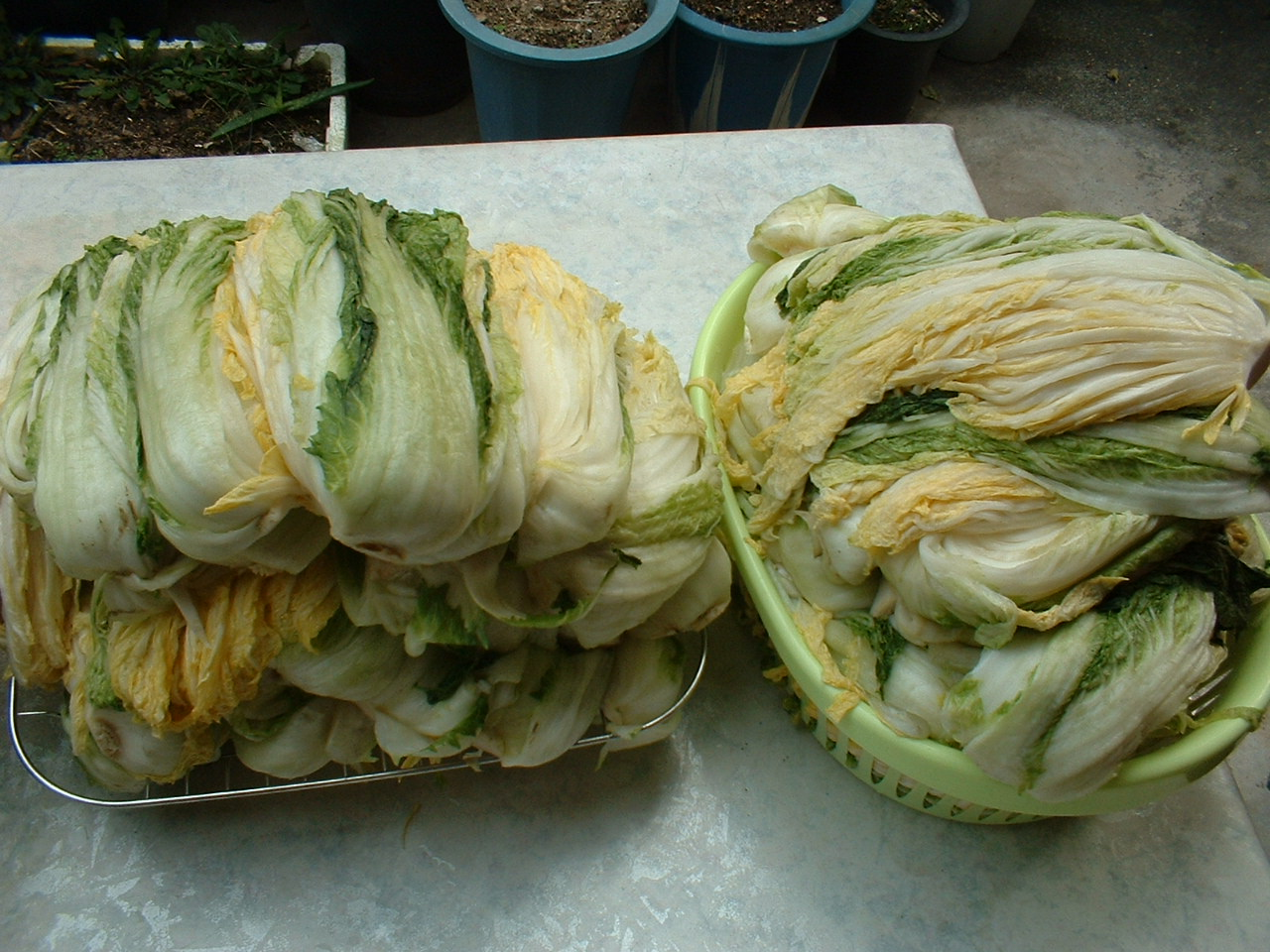
Salted napa cabbage before making kimchi. Cabbage is usually marinated twice to help maintain the salt in the dish.

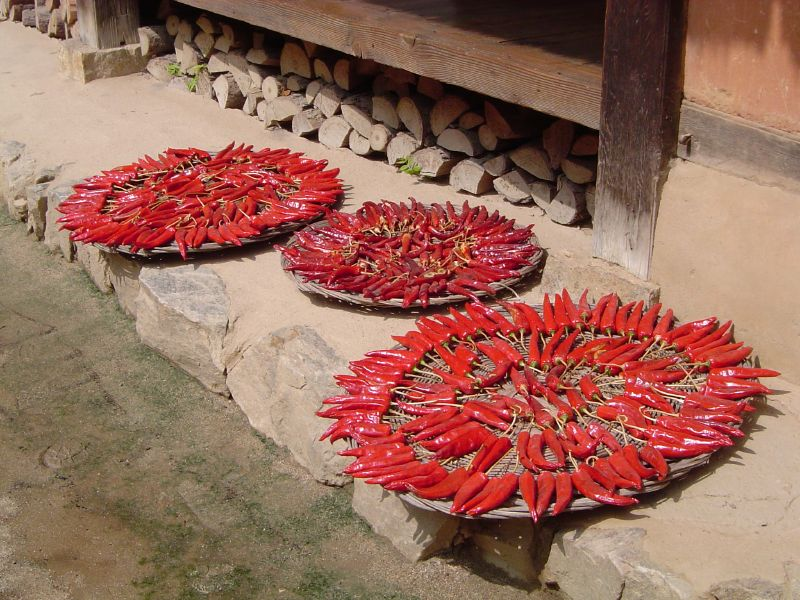
Drying chili peppers for kimchi. After drying they are made into gochugaru, the powder that is added to the seasoning paste for spicy kimchi.

Kimchi varieties are named according to their main vegetable ingredients and the mix of seasonings used to flavor them.

=== Vegetables ===
Cabbages (napa cabbages, bomdong, headed cabbages) and radishes (Korean radishes, ponytail radishes, gegeol radishes, yeolmu radishes) are the most commonly used kimchi vegetables. Other kimchi vegetables include aster, balloon flower roots, burdock roots, celery, chamnamul, cilantro, cress, crown daisy greens, cucumber, eggplant, garlic chives, garlic scapes, ginger, Korean angelica-tree shoots, Korean parsley, Korean wild chive, lotus roots, mustard greens, onions, perilla leaves, bamboo shoot, Momordica charantia, pumpkins, radish greens, rapeseed leaves, scallions, seaweed, soybean sprouts, spinach, sugar beets, sweet potato vines, and tomatoes.

=== Seasonings ===
Brining salt (with a larger grain size compared to kitchen salt) is used mainly for initial salting of kimchi vegetables. Being minimally processed, it serves to help develop flavors in fermented foods. Cabbage is usually salted twice when making spicy kimchi.

Commonly used seasonings include gochugaru (chili powder), scallions, garlic, ginger, and jeotgal (salted seafood) Jeotgal can be replaced with raw seafood in colder Northern parts of the Korean Peninsula. If used, milder saeu-jeot (salted shrimp) or jogi-jeot (salted croaker) is preferred and the amount of jeotgal is also reduced in Northern and Central regions. In Southern Korea, on the other hand, a generous amount of stronger myeolchi-jeot (salted anchovies) and galchi-jeot (salted hairtail) is commonly used. Raw seafood or daegu-agami-jeot (salted cod gills) are used in the East coast areas.

Salt, scallions, garlic, fish sauce, and sugar are commonly added to flavor the kimchi.

== Production ==
To make kimchi, cabbage or daikon is sliced into small, uniform pieces to increase surface area. The pieces are then coated with salt to draw out water and increase salt content, which helps preserve them by preventing the growth of harmful microorganisms. This salting process can use 5–7% salt for 12 hours or 15% salt for 3–7 hours.

After salting, excess water is drained and the seasoning ingredients are added. Sugar can be used to bind any remaining water. Finally, the brined vegetables are packed into airtight jars and left to ferment at room temperature for 24 to 48 hours. The ideal salt concentration during fermentation is about 3%.

Since the fermentation process results in the production of carbon dioxide, the jar should be "burped" daily to release the gas. The more fermentation that occurs, the more carbon dioxide will be incorporated, which results in a very carbonated-drink-like effect.

=== Microorganisms in kimchi ===
The microorganisms present in kimchi include Bacillus mycoides, B. pseudomycoides, B. subtilis, Lactobacillus brevis, Lb. curvatus, Lb. kimchii, Lb. parabrevis, Lb. pentosus, Lb. plantarum, Lb. sakei, Lb. spicheri, Lactococcus carnosum, Lc. gelidum, Lc. lactis, Leuconostoc carnosum, Ln. citreum, Ln. gasicomitatum, Ln. gelidum, Ln. holzapfelii, Ln. inhae, Ln. kimchii, Ln. lactis, Ln. mesenteroides, Serratia marcescens, Weissella cibaria, W. confusa, W. kandleri, W. kimchii. W. koreensis, and W. soli. Archaea and yeasts, such as Saccharomyces, Candida, Pichia, and Kluyveromyces are also present in kimchi, with the latter being responsible for undesirable white colonies that sometimes form in the product as well as food spoilages and off-flavors.

In early fermentation stages, the Leuconostoc variety is found more dominantly in kimchi fermentation because of its lower acid tolerance and microaerophilic properties; the Leuconostoc variety also grows better at low salt concentrations. Throughout the fermentation process, as acidity rises, the Lactobacillus and Weissella variety become dominant because of their higher acid tolerance. Lactobacillus also grows better in conditions with a higher salt concentration.

These microorganisms are present due to the natural microflora provided by utilizing unsterilized food materials in the production of kimchi. The step of salting the raw materials as well as the addition of red pepper powder inhibits the pathogenic and putrefactive bacteria present in the microflora, allowing the lactic acid bacteria (LAB) to flourish and become the dominant microorganism. These anaerobic microorganisms steadily increase in number during the middle stages of fermentation, and prefer to be kept at low temperatures of about 10 °C, pH of 4.2-4, and remain in the presence of 1.5% – 4% NaCl. A faster fermentation at a higher temperature may be chosen as well to accelerate the growth of bacterial cultures for a faster decrease in pH level.

Since the raw cruciferous vegetables themselves are the source of LAB required for fermentation, no starter culture is required for the production of kimchi; rather, spontaneous fermentation occurs. The total population of microorganisms present at the beginning of processing determines the outcome of fermentation, causing the final product to be highly variable in terms of quality and flavor. Currently, there are no recommended approaches to control the microbial community during fermentation to predict the outcome. In the industrial production of kimchi, starter cultures made up of Leu. mesenteroides, Leu. citreum, and Lb. plantarum are used, which are often unsuccessful because they fail to outcompete the naturally occurring cultures on the raw materials.

=== By-products of microorganisms ===
The lactic acid bacteria (LAB) produce lactic acid, hydrogen peroxide, and carbon dioxide as by-products during metabolism. Lactic acid quickly lowers the pH, creating an acidic environment that is uninhabitable for most other microorganisms that survived salting. This also modifies the flavor of sub-ingredients and can increase the nutritive value of the raw materials, as the microbial community in the fermentation process can synthesize B vitamins and hydrolyze cellulose in plant tissues to free nutrients that are normally indigestible by the human gastrointestinal tract. Hydrogen peroxide is formed by the oxidation of reduced nicotinamide adenine dinucleotide (NADH) and provides an antibiotic to inhibit some undesirable microorganisms. Carbon dioxide functions as a preservative, flushing out oxygen to create an anaerobic environment, as well as creating the desired carbonation in the final product.

=== Odor ===
Kimchi is known for its strong, spicy, flavors and odors, although milder varieties exist. Variations in the fermentation process cause the final product to be highly variable in terms of quality and flavor. The strong odor is especially tied to the sulfur compounds from garlic and ginger of kimchi, which can be less appealing to non-Koreans. Thus, scientists are experimenting with the types of bacteria used in its production to minimize the odor to increase the appeal to international markets. These efforts are not universally appreciated by lovers of kimchi, as the flavor is affected in the process, and some see that "South Korea's narrative about its own culinary staple" is being manipulated to suit the foreigners' tastes.

== Varieties ==
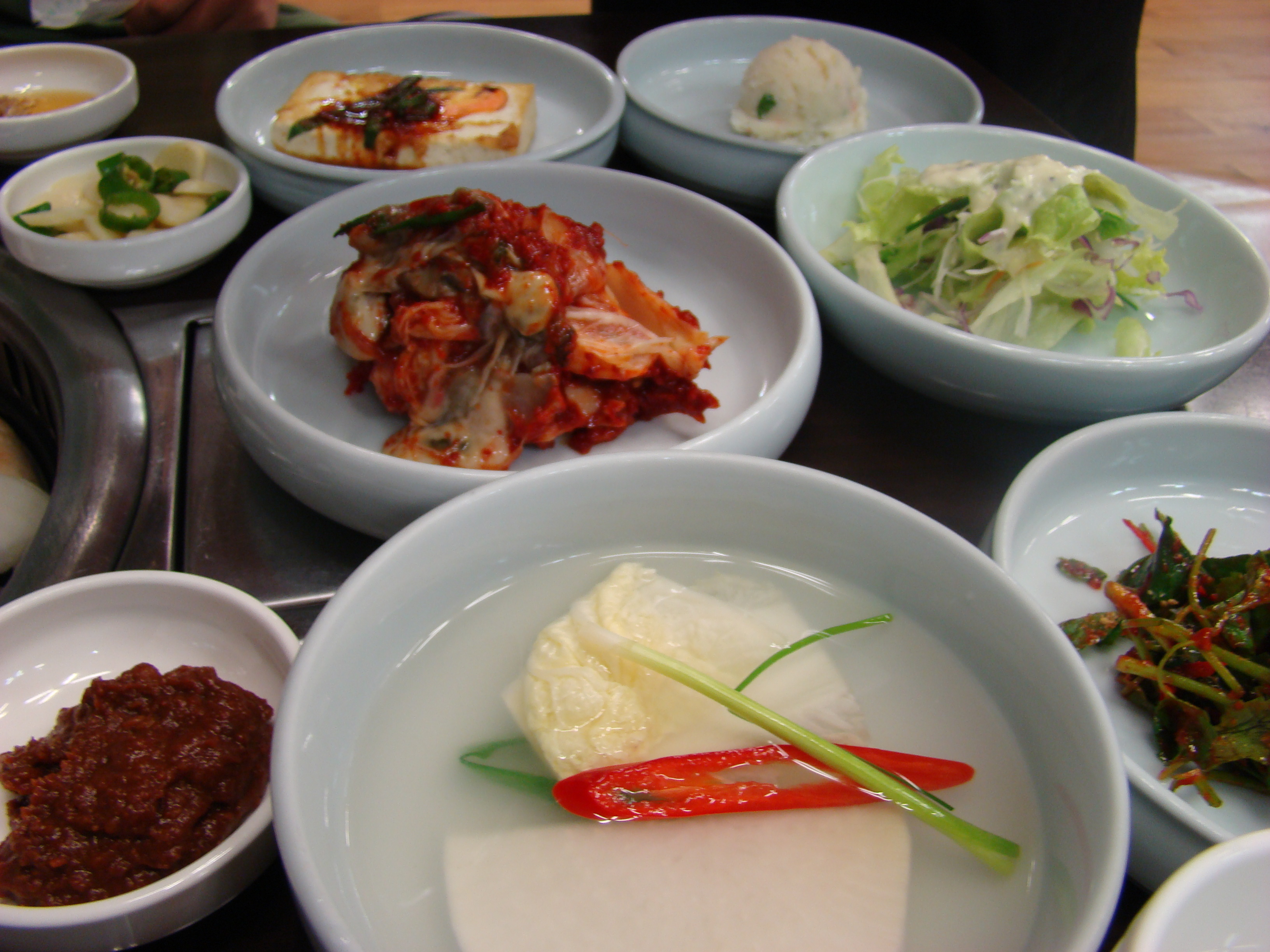
Tongkimchi, gulgimchi (kimchi with additional oyster) and other banchan

Kimchi is one of the most important staples of Korean cuisine. The Korean term "Kimchi" refers to fermented vegetables, and encompasses salt and seasoned vegetables. It is mainly served as a side dish with every meal, but also can be served as a main dish. Kimchi is mainly recognized as a spicy fermented cabbage dish globally.

New variations of kimchi continue to be created, and the taste can vary depending on the region and season. Conventionally, the secret of kimchi preparation was passed down by mothers to their daughters in a bid to make them suitable wives to their husbands. However, with the current technological advancement and increase in social media use, many individuals worldwide can now access recipes for kimchi preparation.

Kimchi can be categorized by main ingredients, regions or seasons. Korea's northern and southern sections have a considerable temperature difference. There are over 180 recognized varieties of kimchi. The most common kimchi variations are:

- Baechu-kimchi (배추김치) spicy napa cabbage kimchi, made from whole cabbage leaves
- Baechu-geotjeori (배추겉절이) unfermented napa cabbage kimchi
- Bossam-kimchi (보쌈김치) wrapped kimchi
- Baek-kimchi (백김치) white kimchi, made without chili pepper
- Dongchimi (동치미) a non-spicy watery kimchi
- Nabak-kimchi (나박김치) a mildly spicy watery kimchi
- Chonggak-kimchi (총각김치) cubed chonggak "ponytail" radish, a popular spicy kimchi
- Kkakdugi (깍두기) spicy cubed Korean radish strongly-scented kimchi containing fermented shrimp
- Oi-sobagi (오이소박이) cucumber kimchi that can be stuffed with seafood and chili paste, and is a popular choice during the spring and summer seasons
- Pa-kimchi (파김치) spicy green onion kimchi
- Yeolmu-kimchi (열무김치) is also a popular choice during the spring and summer, and is made with yeolmu radishes, and does not necessarily have to be fermented.
- Gat-kimchi (갓김치), made with Indian mustard
- Yangbaechu-kimchi (양배추 김치) spicy cabbage kimchi, made from "headed" cabbage leaves (as opposed to napa cabbage)

Kimchi from the northern parts of Korea tend to have less salt and red chili and usually do not include brined seafood for seasoning. Northern kimchi often has a watery consistency. Kimchi made in the southern parts of Korea, such as Jeolla Province and Gyeongsang Province, uses salt, chili peppers and myeolchijeot (멸치젓, brined anchovy allowed to ferment) or saeujeot (새우젓, brined shrimp allowed to ferment), myeolchiaekjeot (멸치액젓), anchovy fish sauce, kkanariaekjeot (까나리액젓), liquid anchovy jeot, similar to fish sauce used in Southeast Asia, but thicker.

Saeujeot (새우젓) or myeolchijeot is not added to the kimchi spice-seasoning mixture, but is simmered first to reduce odors, eliminate tannic flavor and fats, and then is mixed with a thickener made of rice or wheat starch (풀). This technique has been falling into disuse in the past 40 years.

=== Color ===
White kimchi is neither red nor spicy. It includes white napa cabbage kimchi and other varieties such as white radish kimchi (dongchimi). Watery white kimchi varieties are sometimes used as an ingredient in a number of dishes such as cold noodles in dongchimi brine (dongchimi-guksu).

=== Age ===
- Geotjeori (겉절이): unfermented kimchi meant to be eaten fresh
- Mugeun-ji (묵은지), also known as mugeun-kimchi (묵은김치): aged kimchi

=== Region ===
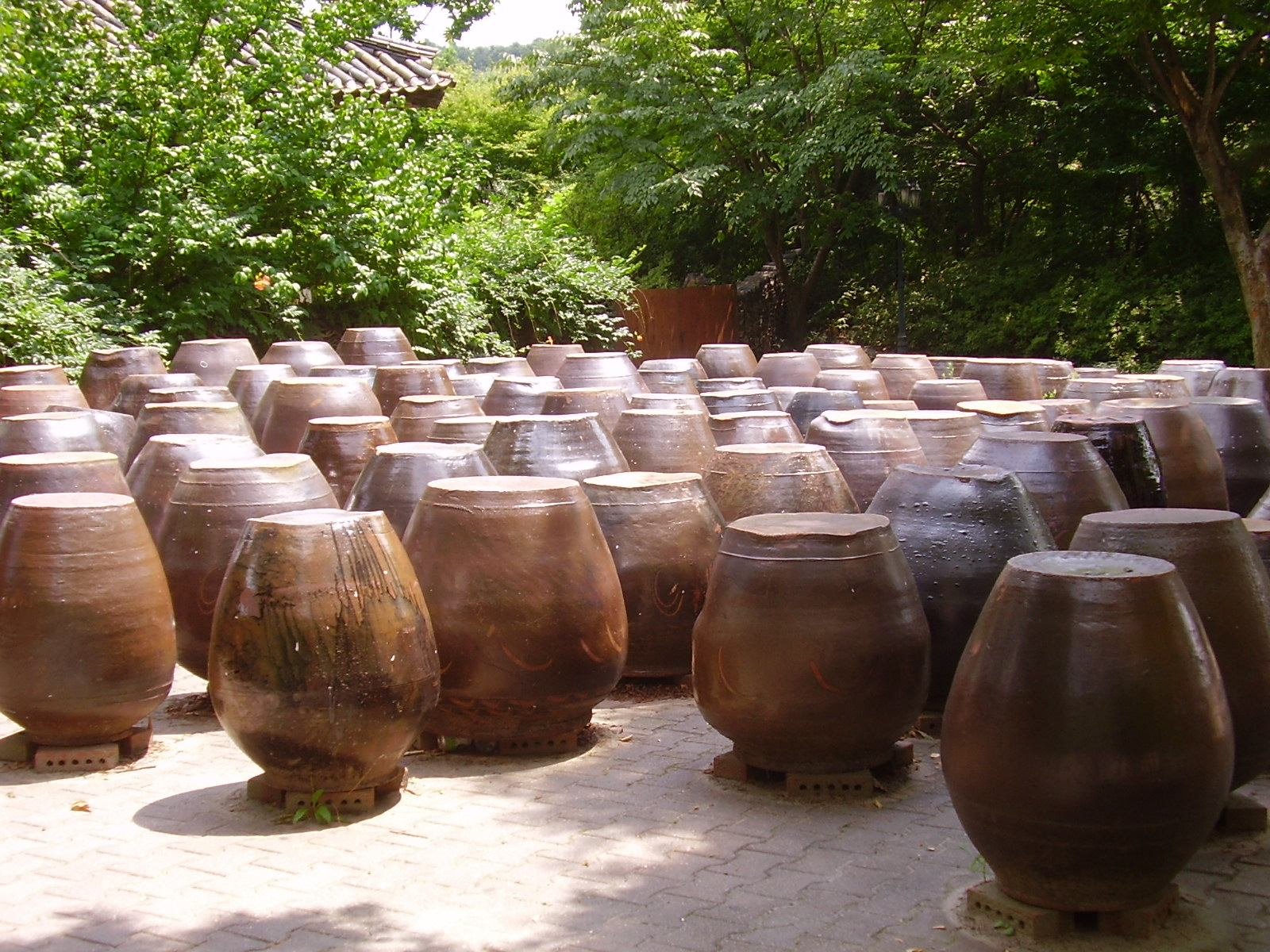
Empty traditional jars (onggi, 옹기), used for storing kimchi, gochujang, doenjang, soy sauce and other pickled banchan (side dishes)

The following regional classification dates to the 1960s. Since then, kimchi-making practices and trends in Korea have diverged from it.

- Pyongan Province Non-traditional ingredients have been adopted in rural areas due to severe food shortages.
- Hamgyong Province: Due to its proximity to the ocean, people in this particular region use fresh fish and oysters to season their kimchi.
- Hwanghae Province: The taste of kimchi in Hwanghae Province is not bland but not extremely spicy. Most kimchi from this region have less color since red chili flakes are not used. The typical kimchi in Hwanghae Province is called hobakji (호박지). It is made with pumpkin (bundi).
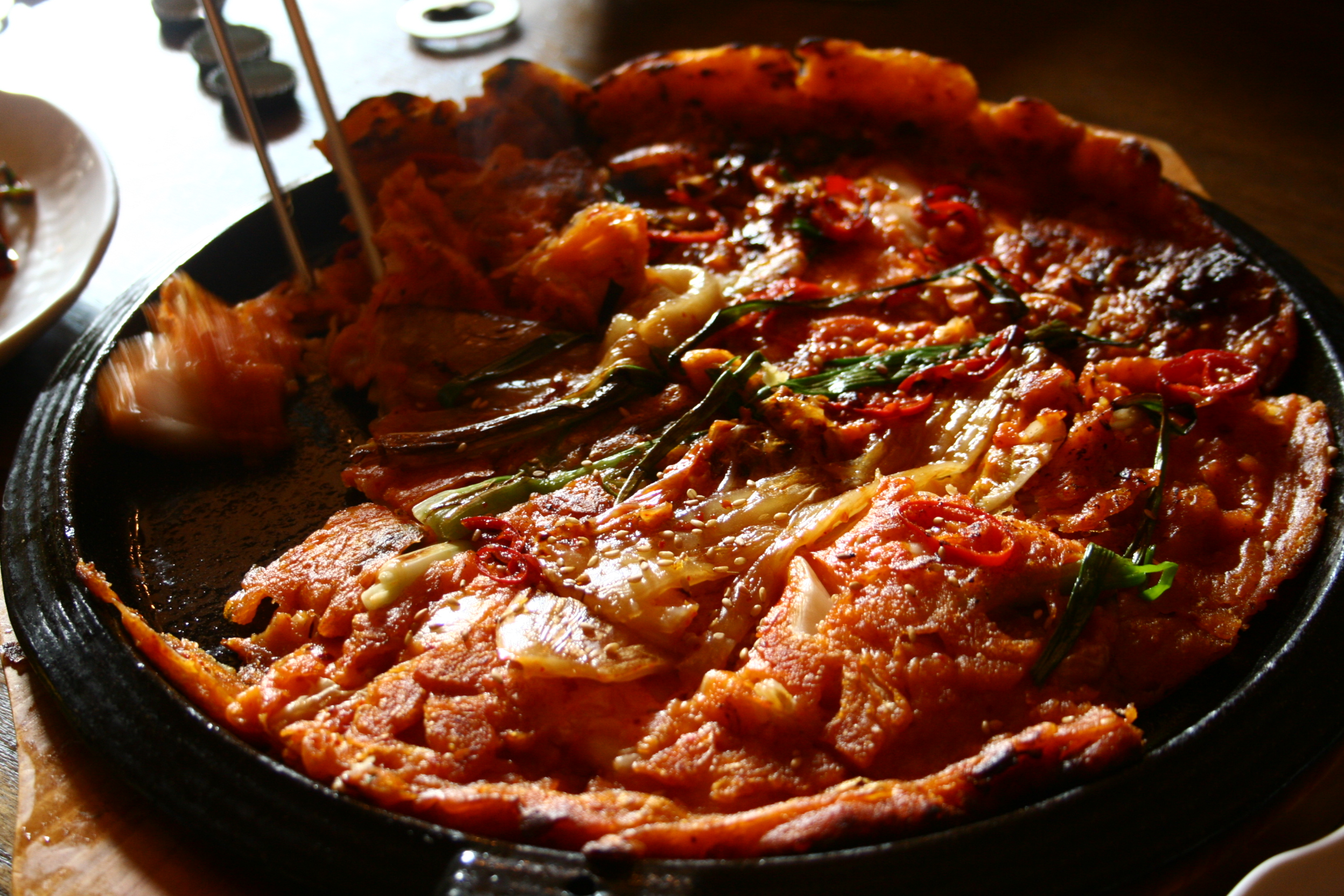
  Kimchi-buchimgae, a savory Korean pancake with kimchi
- Gyeonggi Province
- Chungcheong Province: Instead of using fermented fish, people in the region rely on salt and fermentation to make savory kimchi. Chungcheong Province has the most varieties of kimchi.
- Gangwon Province, South Korea/Kangwon Province, North Korea: In Gangwon Province, kimchi is stored for longer periods. Unlike other coastal regions in Korea, kimchi in this area does not contain much salted fish.
- Jeolla Province: Salted yellow corvina and salted butterfish are used in this region to create different seasonings for kimchi.
- Gyeongsang Province: This region's cuisine is saltier and spicier. The most common seasoning components include myeolchijeot (멸치젓) which produces a briny and savory flavor. They also use oysters in their kimchi.
- Foreign countries: In some places of the world people sometimes make kimchi with western cabbage and many other alternative ingredients such as broccoli.

=== Seasonal variations ===
Different types of kimchi were traditionally made at different times of the year, based on when various vegetables were in season and also to take advantage of hot and cold seasons before the era of refrigeration. Although the advent of modern refrigeration – including kimchi refrigerators specifically designed with precise controls to keep different varieties of kimchi at optimal temperatures at various stages of fermentation – has made this seasonality unnecessary, Koreans continue to consume kimchi according to traditional seasonal preferences.

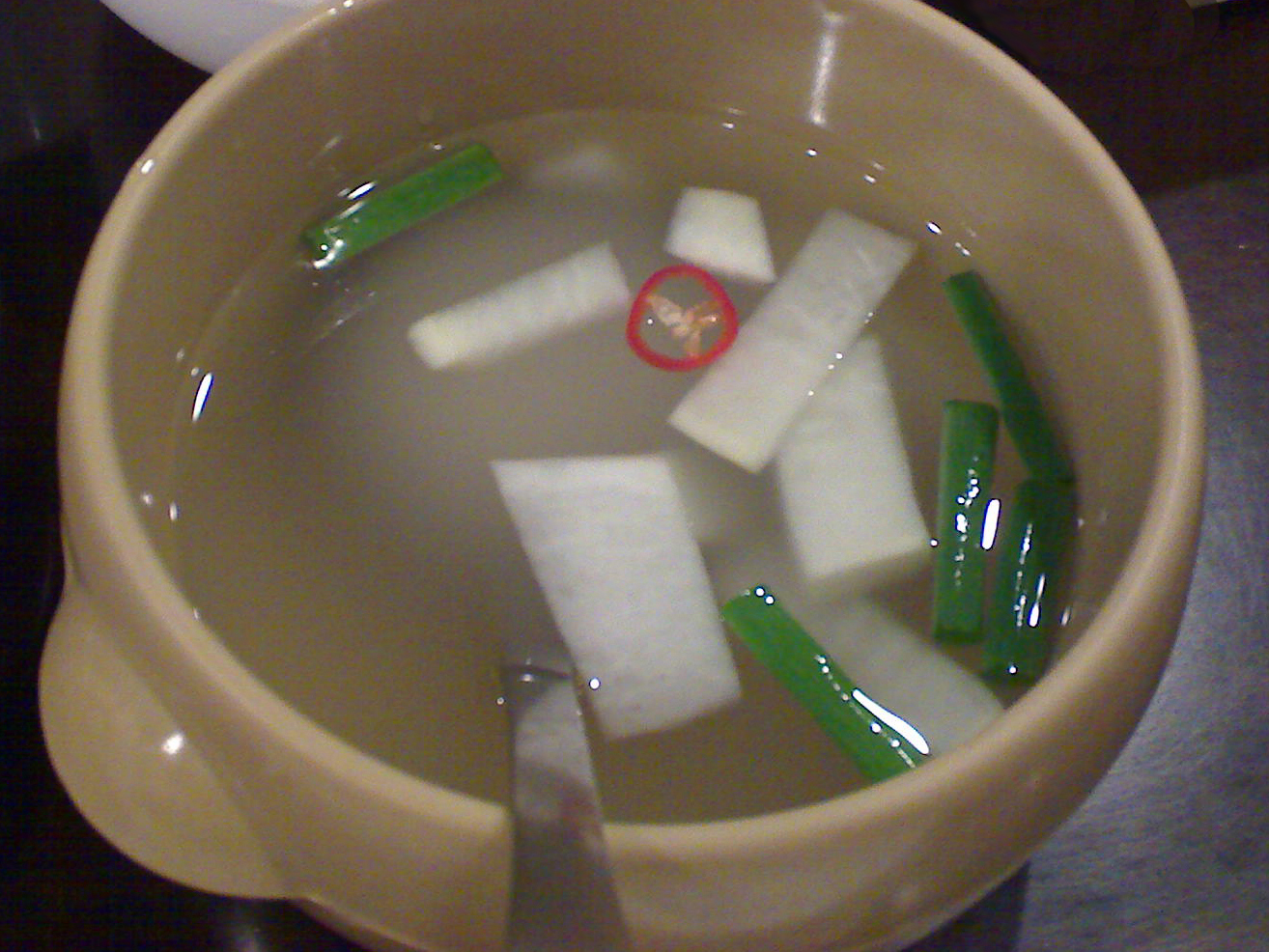
Dongchimi (동치미) is largely served during winter. Dongchimi is also used to make buckwheat naengmyeon, a popular dish during hot months.

==== Spring ====
After a long period of consuming gimjang kimchi (김장김치) during the winter, fresh potherbs and vegetables were used to make kimchi. These kinds of kimchi were not fermented or even stored for long periods of time but were consumed fresh.

==== Summer ====
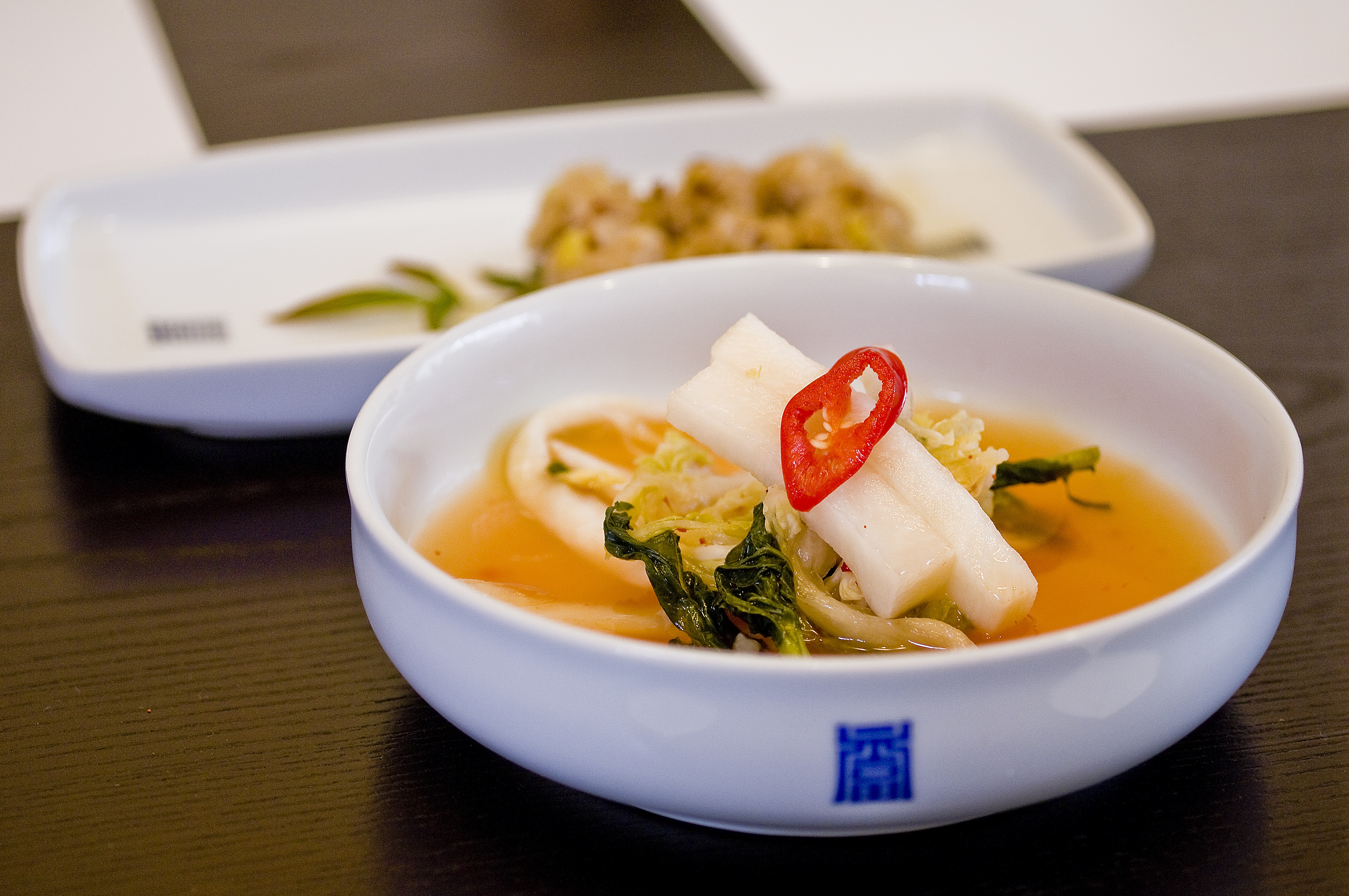
Yeolmu-kimchi, cold, watery kimchi that is usually eaten with oily foods, is consumed mostly in the summer.

Yeolmu radishes and cucumbers are summer vegetables made into kimchi, yeolmu-kimchi (열무김치) which is eaten in several bites. Brined fish or shellfish can be added, and freshly ground dried chili peppers are often used.

==== Autumn ====
Baechu kimchi is prepared by inserting blended stuffing materials, called sok (literally inside), between layers of salted leaves of uncut, whole Napa cabbage. The ingredients of sok (속) can vary, depending on the regions and weather conditions. Generally, baechu kimchi used to have a strong salty flavor until the late 1960s, before which a large amount of myeolchijeot or saeujeot had been used.

Gogumasoon Kimchi is made from sweet potato stems.

==== Winter ====
Traditionally, the greatest varieties of kimchi were available during the winter. In preparation for the long winter months, many types of kimjang kimchi (김장 김치) were prepared in early winter and stored in the ground in large kimchi pots. Today, many city residents use modern kimchi refrigerators offering precise temperature controls to store kimjang kimchi. November and December are traditionally when people begin to make kimchi; women often gather together in each other's homes to help with winter kimchi preparations. "Baechu kimchi" is made with salted baechu filled with thin strips of radish, parsley, pine nuts, pears, chestnuts, shredded red pepper, manna lichen (Korean: 석이 버섯; RR: seogi beoseot), garlic, and ginger.

=== Korean preference ===
As of 2004, the preference of kimchi preparation in Korean households from the most prepared type of kimchi to less prepared types of kimchi was: baechu kimchi, being the most prepared type of kimchi, then kkakdugi, then dongchimi and then chonggak kimchi. Baechu kimchi comprised more than seventy percent of marketed kimchi and radish kimchi comprised about twenty percent of marketed kimchi.

== Nutrition ==
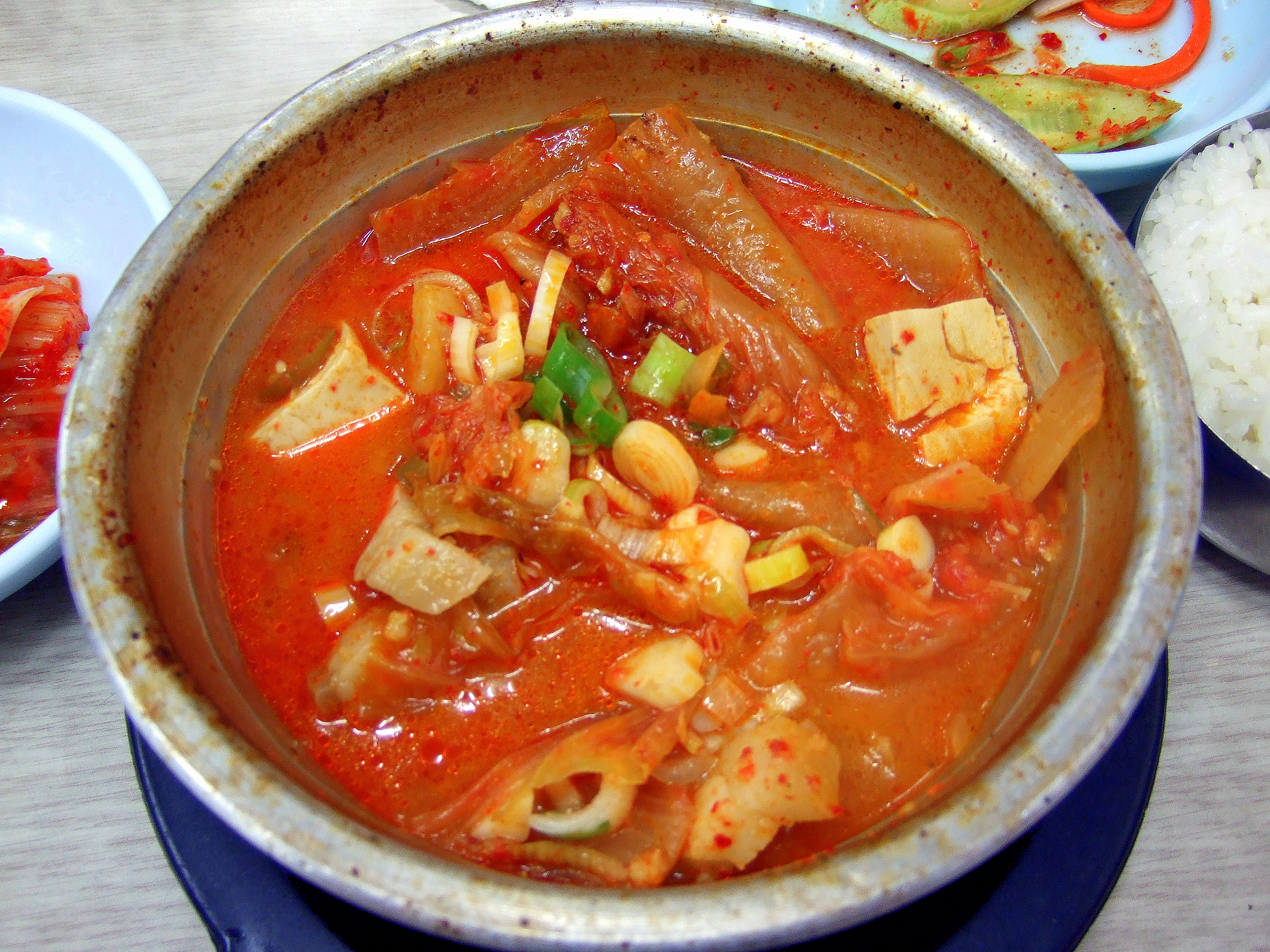
Kimchi jjigae (김치찌개), a stew made of kimchi, vegetables, broth, and other ingredients, is a popular dish during the cold months.

Kimchi is made of various vegetables and contains a high concentration of dietary fiber, while being low in food energy. The vegetables used in kimchi also contribute to intake of vitamin A, thiamine (B_{1}), riboflavin (B_{2}), calcium, and iron.

Nutritional composition of typical kimchi
Nutrients	per 100 g	Nutrients	per 100 g
Food energy	32	Moisture	88.4 g
Crude protein	2.0 g	Crude lipid	0.6 g
Total sugar	1.3 g	Crude fiber	1.2 g
Crude ash	0.5 g	Calcium	45 mg
Phosphorus	28 mg	Vitamin A	492 IU
Vitamin B_{1}	0.03 mg	Vitamin B_{2}	0.06 mg
Niacin	2.1 mg	Vitamin C	21 mg

Vitamin contents of common kimchi and average vitamin contents of 4 kimchi during fermentation at 3–7 °C
Fermentation time (week)	Carotene (μg%)	Vitamin B_{1} (μg%)	Vitamin B_{2} (μg%)	Vitamin B_{12} (μg%)	Niacin (μg%)	Vitamin C (mg%)
0	49.5^{a}	41.7	66	0.17	740	28.9
1	44.0 (35.4)^{b}	41.6 (40.1)	47 (54)	0.09 (0.09)	781 (747)	25.0 (25.3)
2	32.0 (30.4)	70.9 (61.9)	110 (99)	0.19 (0.20)	928 (861)	27.8 (28.5)
3	26.6 (26.9)	79.1 (87.5)	230 (157)	0.25 (0.33)	901 (792)	23.6 (22.3)
4	21.0 (25.3)	62.7 (70.8)	35 (95)	0.20 (0.26)	591 (525)	16.7 (16.0)
5	24.2 (20.1)	53.3 (49.1)	40 (37)	0.10 (0.16)		11.16 (11.0)
^{a}Naturally fermented baechu kimchi^{b}Average levels of four kimchis; common kimchi +3 different starter inoculated kimchis
Source: Hui et al. (2005) who cited Lee et al. (1960)

General components of kimchi (per 100g of edible portion)
Components	Baechu-kimchi	Kaktugi	Gat-kimchi	Pa-kimchi	Baek-kimchi	Yeolmu-kimchi	Dongchimi	Nabak-kimchi
Calorie (kcal)	18	33	41	52	8	38	11	9
Moisture (%)	90.8	88.4	83.2	80.7	95.7	84.5	94.2	95.1
Crude protein (g)	2	1.6	3.9	3.4	0.7	3.1	0.7	0.8
Crude lipid (g)	0.5	0.3	0.9	0.8	0.1	0.6	0.1	0.1
Crude ash (g)	2.8	2.3	3.5	3.3	1.5	3.2	2	1.5
Carbohydrate (g)	3.9	7.4	8.5	11.8	2	8.6	3	2.5
Dietary fiber (g)	3	2.8	4	5.1	1.4	3.3	0.8	1.5
Source: Tamang (2015) who cited Lee (2006)

Vitamin content of kimchi (per 100g of edible portion)
Vitamins	Baechu-kimchi	Kaktugi	Gat-kimchi	Pa-kimchi	Baek-kimchi	Yeolmu-kimchi	Dongchimi	Nabak-kimchi
Vitamin A (RE)	48	38	390	352	9	595	15	77
Vitamin A (β-carotene) (μg)	290	226	2342	2109	53	3573	88	460
Vitamin B_{1} (mg)	0.06	0.14	0.15	0.14	0.03	0.15	0.02	0.03
Vitamin B_{2} (mg)	0.06	0.05	0.14	0.14	0.02	0.29	0.02	0.06
Niacin (mg)	0.8	0.5	1.3	0.9	0.3	0.6	0.2	0.5
Vitamin C (mg)	14	19	48	19	10	28	9	10
Vitamin B_{6} (mg)	0.19	0.13						
Folic acid (μg)	43.3	58.9	74.8					
Vitamin E (mg)	0.7	0.2	1.3					
Not detected: vitamin A (retinol), pantothenic acid, vitamin B_{12}, vitamin K
Source: Tamang (2015) who cited Lee (2006)

A 2003 article said that South Koreans consume 18 kg (40 lbs) of kimchi per person annually. Many credit the Korean Miracle in part to the popularity of the dish. Adult Koreans eat from 50 grams (0.11 lb) to 200 grams (0.44 lb) of kimchi a day.

== Trade ==
South Korea spent around $129 million in 2017 to purchase 275,000 metric tons of foreign kimchi, more than 11 times the amount it exported, according to data released by the Korea Customs Service in 2017. South Korea consumes 1.85 million metric tons of kimchi annually, or 36.1 kg per person. It imports a significant fraction of that, mostly from China, and runs a $47.3 million kimchi trade deficit.

Import and export of kimchi
Year	Volume (tons)		Value (thousand USD)		
Year	Export	Import	Export	Import	Surplus
2022	41,121	263,435	140,823	169,400	-28,577
2021	42,540	240,606	159,915	140,742	19,173
2020	39,748	281,187	144,511	152,426	−7,915
2019	29,628	306,050	104,992	130,911	−25,919
2018	28,197	290,742	97,456	138,215	−40,759
2017	24,311	275,631	81,393	128,679	−47,286
2016	23,490	253,432	78,900	121,485	−42,585
2015	23,111	224,124	73,543	113,237	−39,694
2014	24,742	212,938	84,033	104,396	−20,363
2013	25,631	220,218	89277	117,431	−28,154
2012	27,664	218,845	106,608	110,842	−4,234
2011	27,429	230,078	104,577	120,874	−16,297
2010	29,672	192,936	98,360	102,019	−3,659

== Consumption ==
In 2021, Koreans collectively consumed 1,965,000 tons of Kimchi, with average Korean consuming 88.3 grams of Kimchi daily. This average has been steadily declining from 109.9 grams per day in 2010, marking a 19.6% decrease. Males tend to consume more Kimchi than females, with an average of 106.6 grams compared to 70.0 grams.

Average Kimchi Consumption (grams per day)
Year	Total	Male	Female
2010	109.9	129.0	90.8
2015	96.3	115.1	77.6
2020	88.3	106.6	70.0
CAGR	−2.16%	−1.89%	−2.57%

== Food regulations ==
The Canadian Food Inspection Agency has regulations for the commercial production of kimchi. The final product should have a pH ranging from 4.2 to 4.5. Any low-acidity ingredients with a pH above 4.6, including white daikon and napa cabbage, should not be left under conditions that enable the growth of undesirable microorganisms and require a written illustration of the procedure designed to ensure this is available if requested. This procedural design should include steps that maintain sterility of the equipment and products used, and the details of all sterilization processes. The cutoff pH of 4.6 is a value common to many food safety regulations, initially defined because botulism toxin is not produced below this level.

== Gallery ==
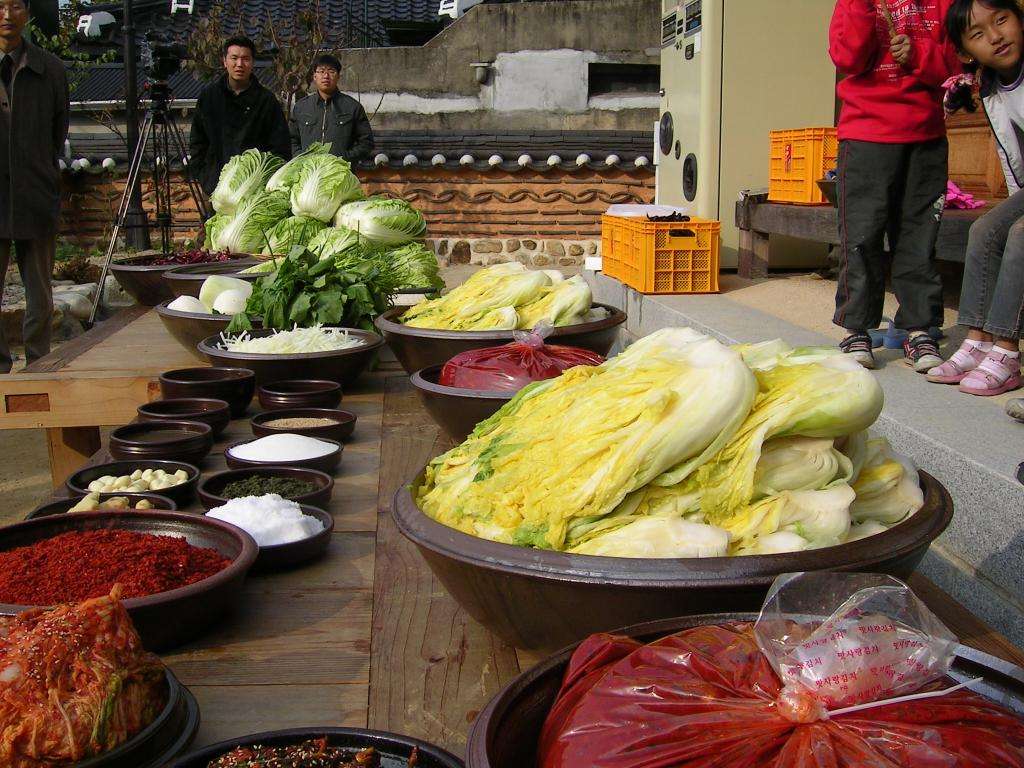
Preparation for making kimchi

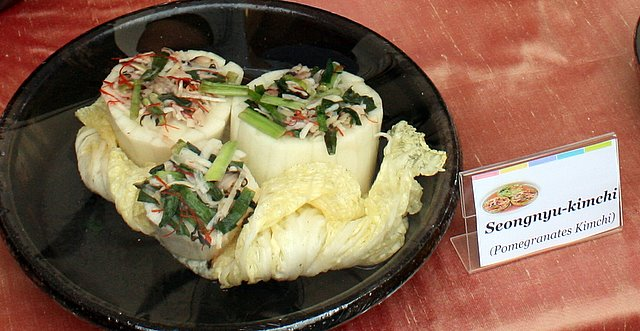
Seokryu kimchi named after its pomegranate-like shape

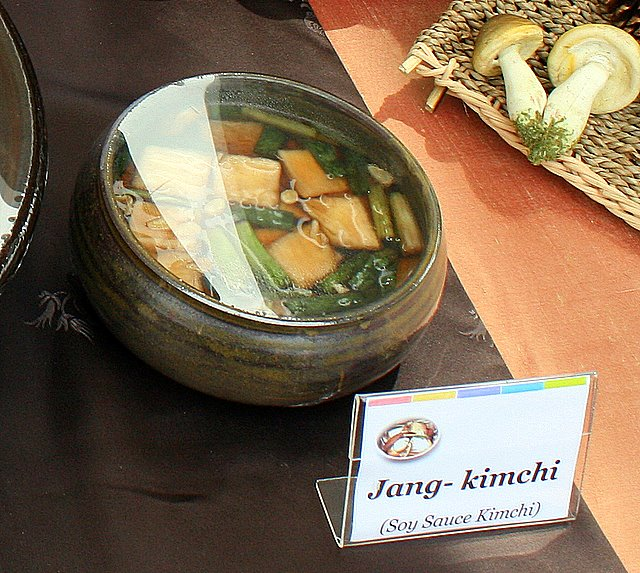
Jang kimchi, pickled with soy sauce

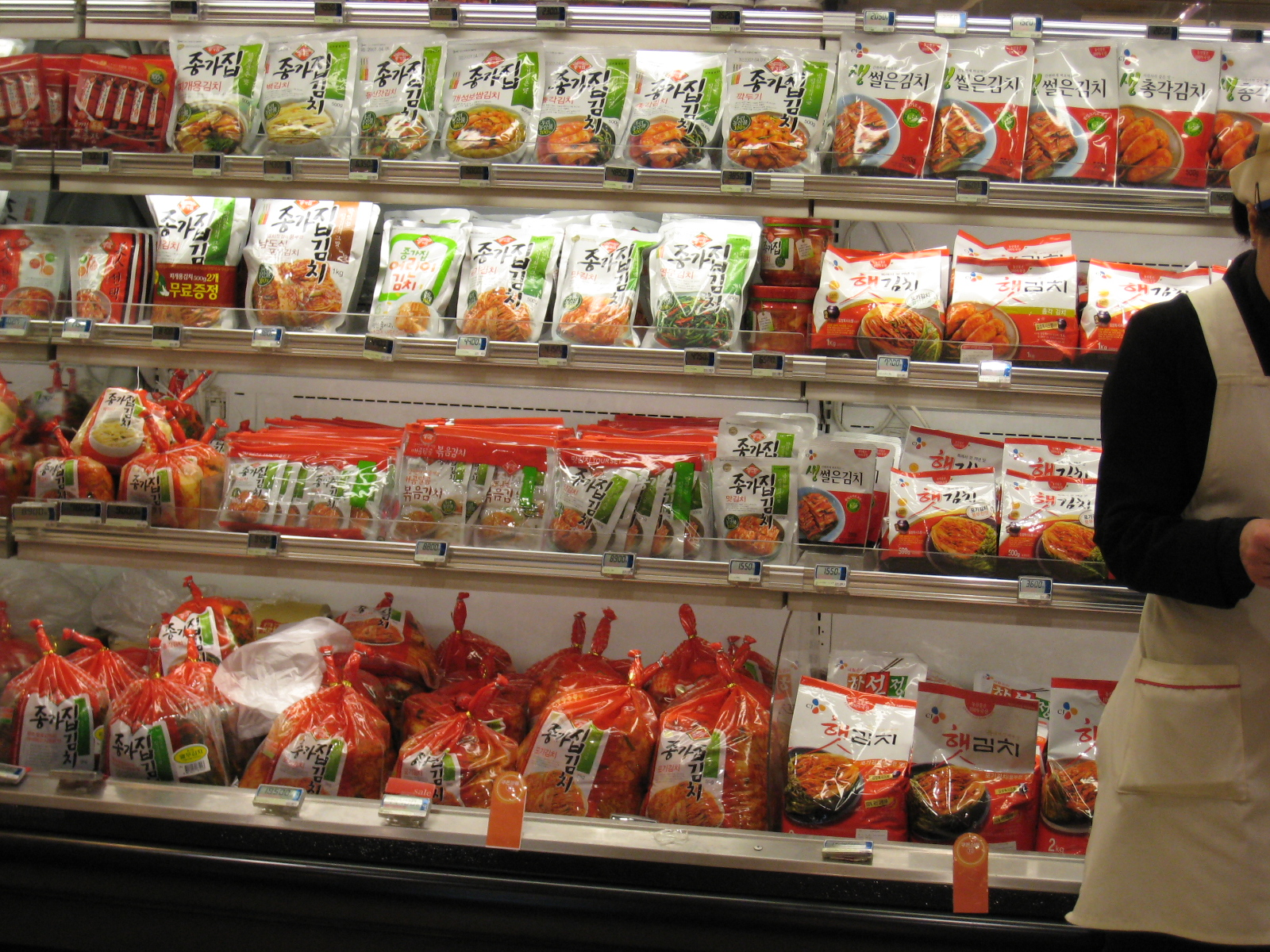
Displayed manufactured kimchi

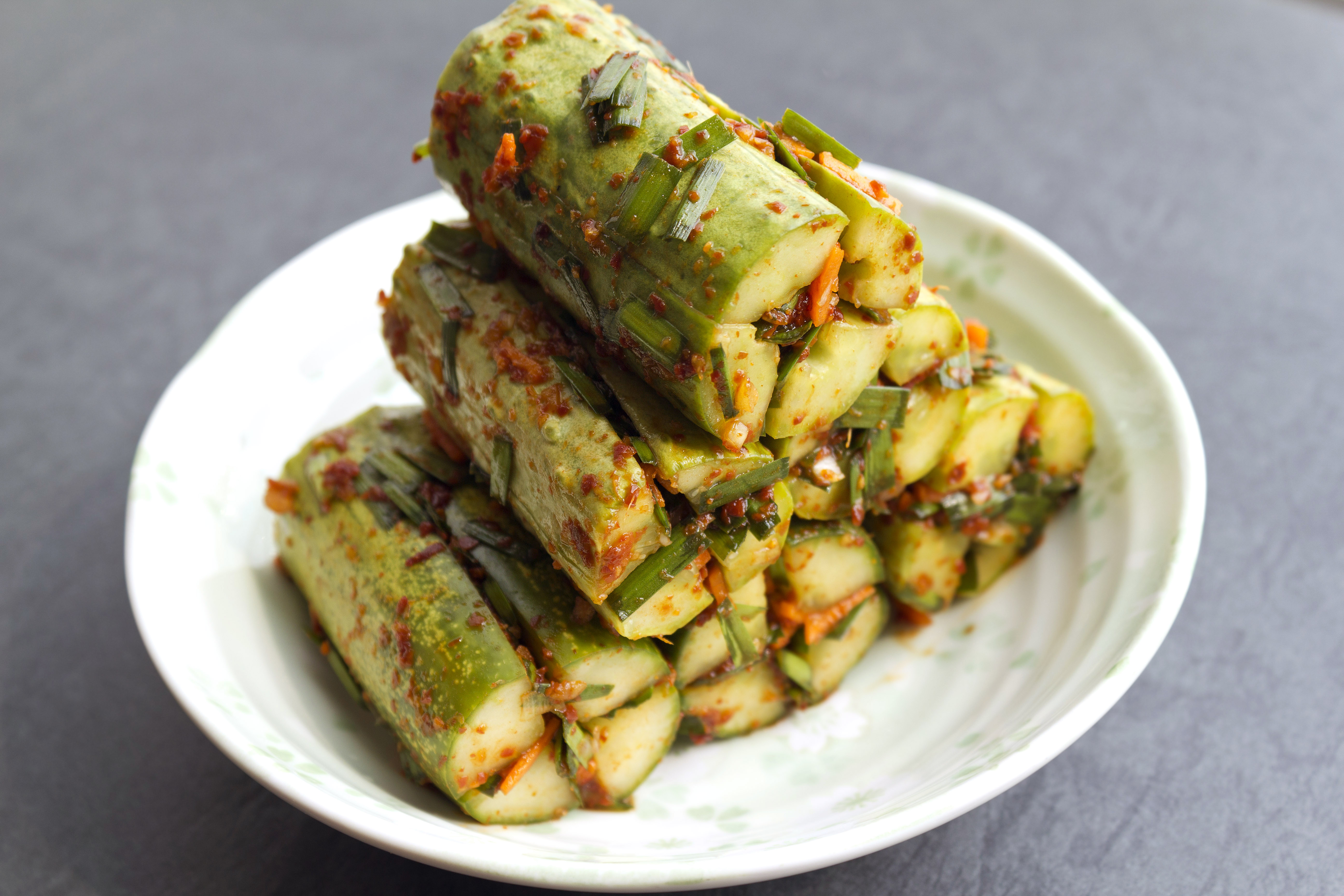
Oi-sobagi (cucumber kimchi)

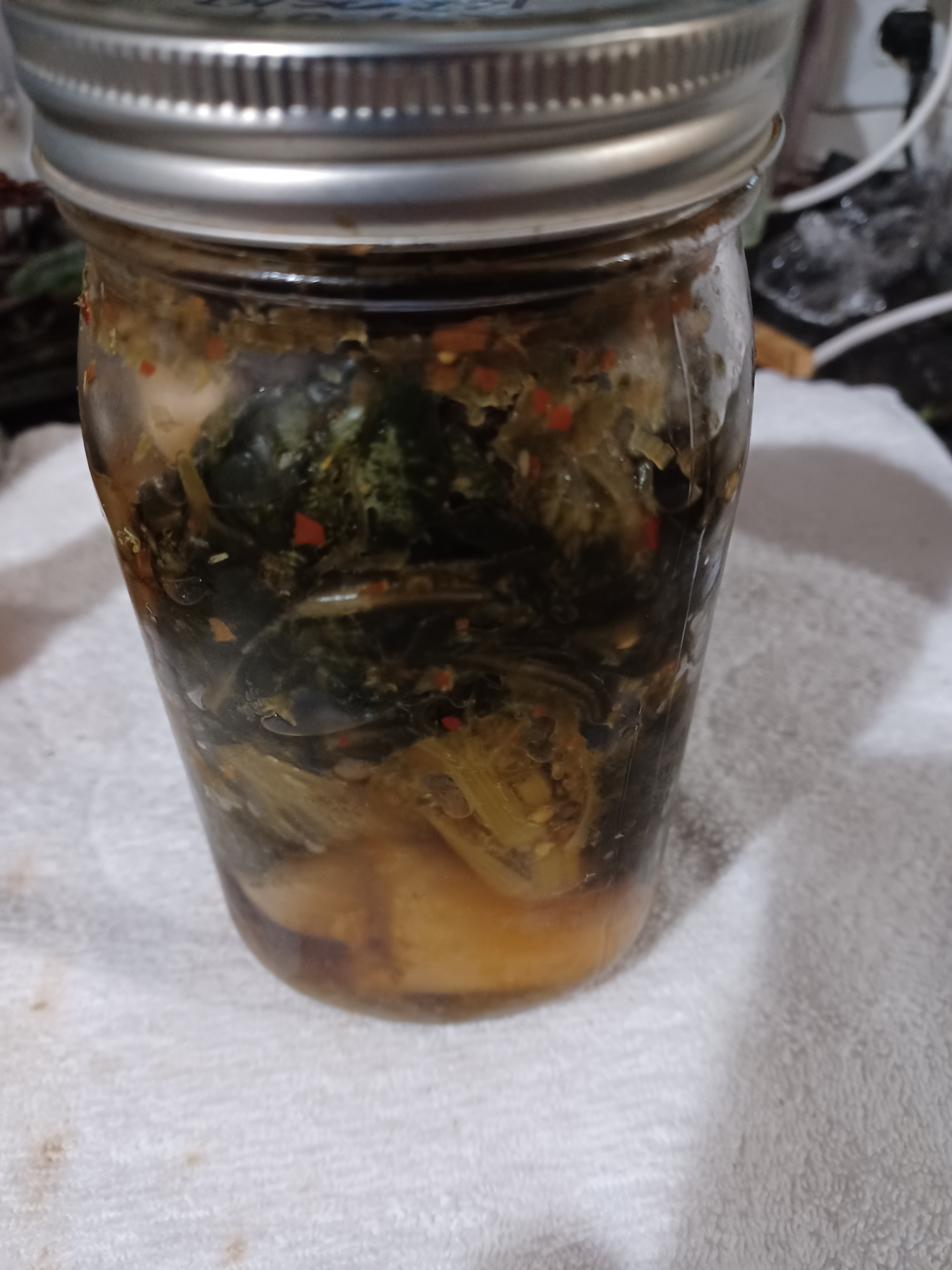
Homemade green kimchi, made with bok choy with a green onion and garlic scape-based chili paste

== See also ==
- World Institute of Kimchi – South Korean food R&D organization
- Foods containing tyramine – Trace amine
- Jangajji – Korean pickled vegetable dish
- Jeotgal – Korean salted seafood category
- Kimchi burger
- Korean radish – Variety of edible white radish
- Korean brining salt – Coarse salt
- Morkovcha – Koryo-saram spicy marinated carrot dish – a variety of kimchi made of carrots by Koryo-saram
- List of cabbage dishes
- List of English words of Korean origin
- List of pickled foods
- Pao cai – Pickle in Chinese cuisine.
- Sauerkraut – Finely sliced and fermented cabbage
- Torshi, also known as Tursu – Procedure of preserving food in brine or vinegar
