= Perennis =

Perennis (Latin, 'perennial'), may refer to:

- Perennial philosophy (Latin: philosophia perennis)
- Tigidius Perennis (died 185), a prefect of the Roman imperial bodyguard

== See also ==
- Perennial (disambiguation)
- List of Roman cognomina
