= Gat-kimchi =

Korean side dish made of mustard greens

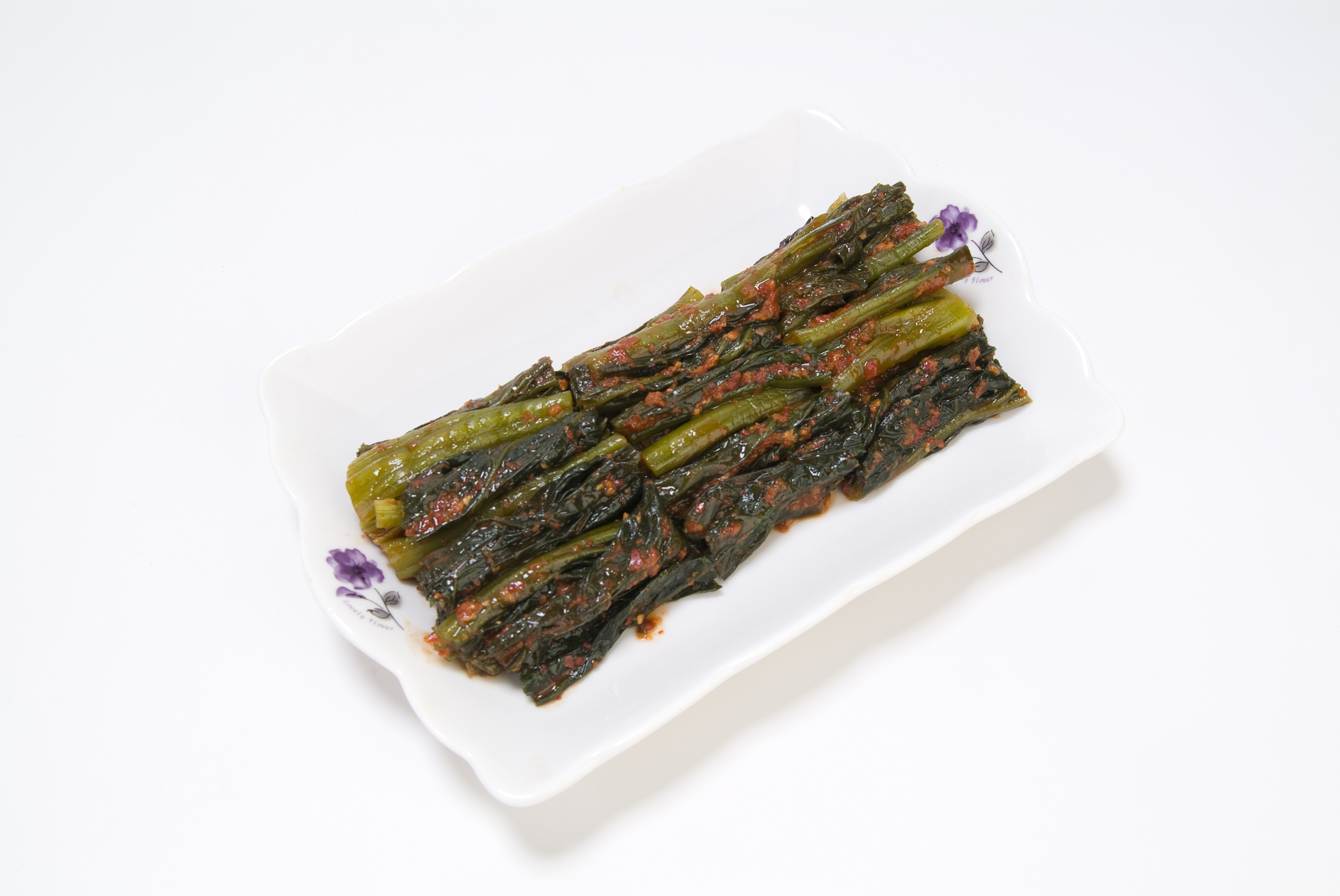
- Type: Kimchi
- Course: Side dish
- Region or state: Korea
- Main ingredients: Mustard greens

Gat-kimchi (Korean: 갓김치) is a regional variety of the Korean side dish kimchi, and is made from mustard greens instead of the more typical napa cabbage.

The island Dolsando in Yeosu, South Jeolla Province is known for its gat-kimchi.

== Gallery ==
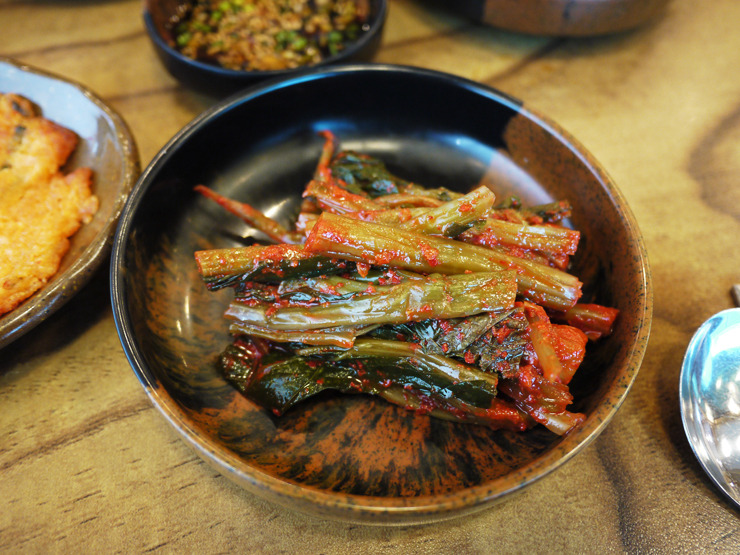
Gat-kimchi served in a restaurant

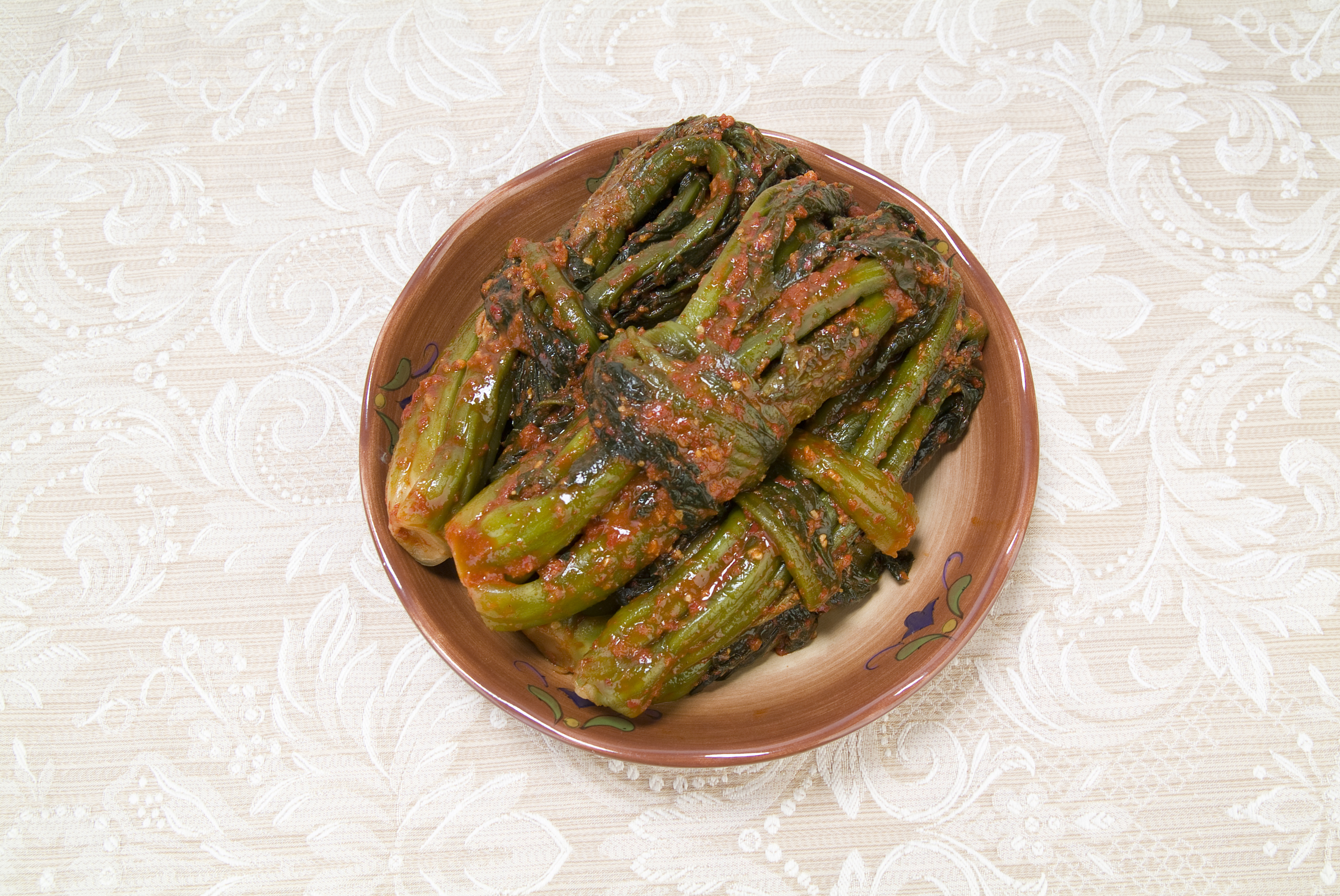
Gat-kimchi plated by wrapping some stalks around others
