= Gimjang =

Process of making and storing kimchi

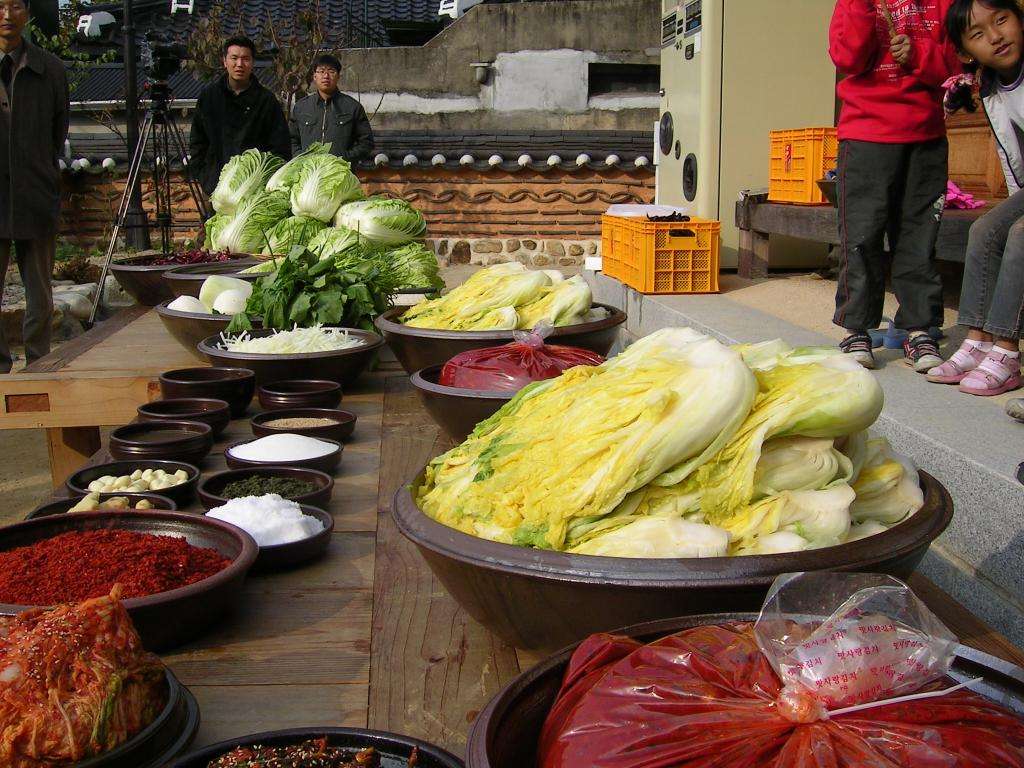
- Preparing for gimjang: ingredients to make kimchi on a larger scale

Gimjang
- Hangul: 김장
- RR: gimjang
- MR: kimjang

Gimjang (Korean: 김장) (Note: also spelled kimjang) is the traditional process of preparation and preservation of kimchi, a spicy Korean fermented vegetable dish, in the wintertime. During the summer months, kimchi is made fresh, from seasonal vegetables. For one month, starting from the tenth month of the year, people prepare large quantities of kimchi that will last throughout the winter.

Gimjang was listed as a UNESCO Intangible Cultural Heritage in December 2013 and the 133rd Korean Intangible Cultural Property.

== Background ==
Kimchi can be eaten as an accompaniment to almost any meal and is an important part of Korean culture. Recipes date back to at least the 13th century, when it was made from vegetables, pickles, and either salt or a mixture of alcohol and salt. Red pepper was added to the ingredients in the 17th century. Modern-day kimchi is typically made from napa cabbage and white radish, although there are hundreds of variations; it may also contain turnip, leeks, carrots, and garlic.

== Process ==
In the cooler weather of November, there are many crops in the fields and market-places, and the gimjang process begins. Before industrialization, the ardous task was traditionally shared by familial contacts. Groups gather to cut the vegetables, wash them, and add salt to cure the food and begin the fermentation process.

The nature of kimchi means that it is challenging to store for long periods; if it is too cold, it will freeze, and if it is too warm, it will over ferment, and may turn sour. The traditional solution prior to effective modern refrigeration is to store kimchi in earthenware jars in the ground, buried up to the neck level of the jar to prevent the contents from freezing. As the temperature falls below 0 °C, fermentation is halted and the food is preserved; it begins again as the temperature increases in spring time.

Despite modern advances in refrigeration, the custom of gimjang continues to be passed down the generations. It is common in cities for people to store large jars of fermenting kimchi on balconies. It is also increasingly common to own and use secondary refrigerators designed specifically for storing kimchi, as the strong odors of kimchi can taint any other products in a refrigerator.
