= Pa-kimchi =

Variant of the Korean dish kimchi

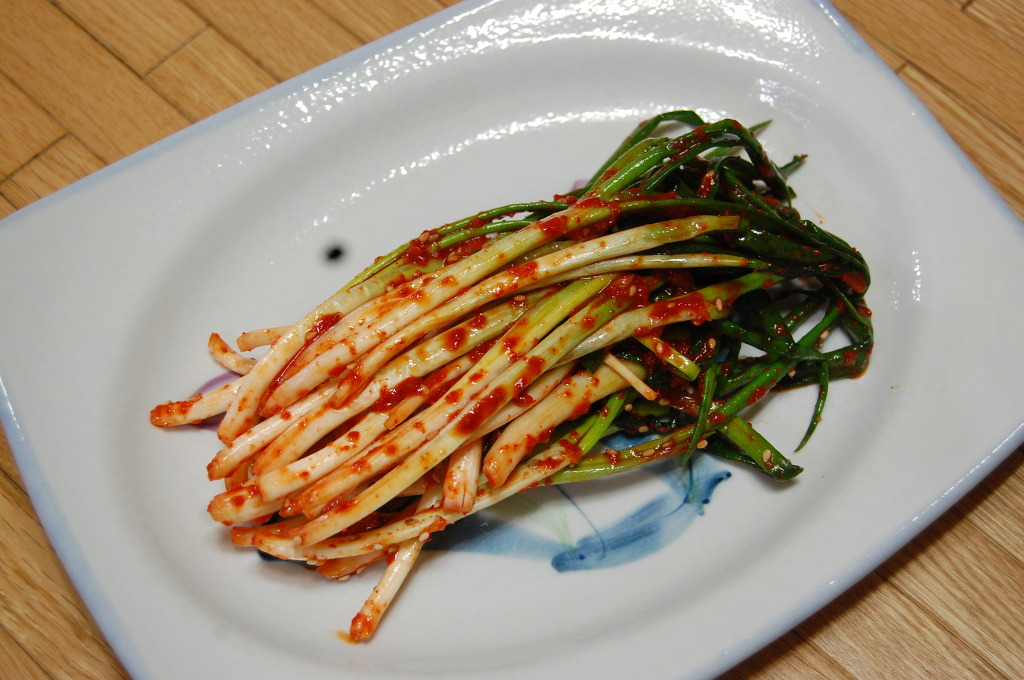
- Alternative names: Scallion kimchi
- Type: Kimchi
- Place of origin: Korea
- Main ingredients: Scallion

Korean name
- Hangul: 파김치
- RR: pagimchi
- MR: p'agimch'i
- IPA: [pʰa.ɡim.tɕʰi]

Pa-kimchi (Korean: 파김치), also known as green onion kimchi or scallion kimchi, is a type of kimchi that Koreans usually eat for banchan (traditional side dishes) and is most popular in Jeolla Province. Pa-kimchi uses medium-thick green onions known as jjokpa (쪽파), which are fermented to maturity in powdered red pepper gochutgaru, garlic, ginger and seasoned with myeolchi jeot (salted anchovies). It is known for its hot spicy taste.

South Koreans add either fermented anchovies or fermented brine shrimp (saeujeot), depending on the region.

== Nutrition ==
Nutrition
Nutrients	per 100g	Nutrients	per 100g	Nutrients	per 100g	Nutrients	per 100g
Carbohydrate	4.5g	Protein	1.5g	glucose	0.5g	Potassium	163.67 mg
Fat	0.6g	Dietary Fiber	1.8g	fructose	0.5g	Calcium	5 mg
Vitamin B1	0.09 mg	Vitamin B2	0.08 mg	lactose	0.0g	Iron	5.1 mg
Niacin	1.25 mg	Vitamin C	0.00 mg	maltose	0.1g	Phosphorus	26.75 mg
Retinol	0.0 mg	Beta-carotene	764.22 mg	Sugar	1.1g	Saturated fat	0.1g
Cholesterol	2.17 mg	Sucrose	0.0g	Sodium	408.05 mg	Trans fat	0,0g

== See also ==
- List of onion dishes
