= Baek-kimchi =

Kimchi made without the chili pepper powder

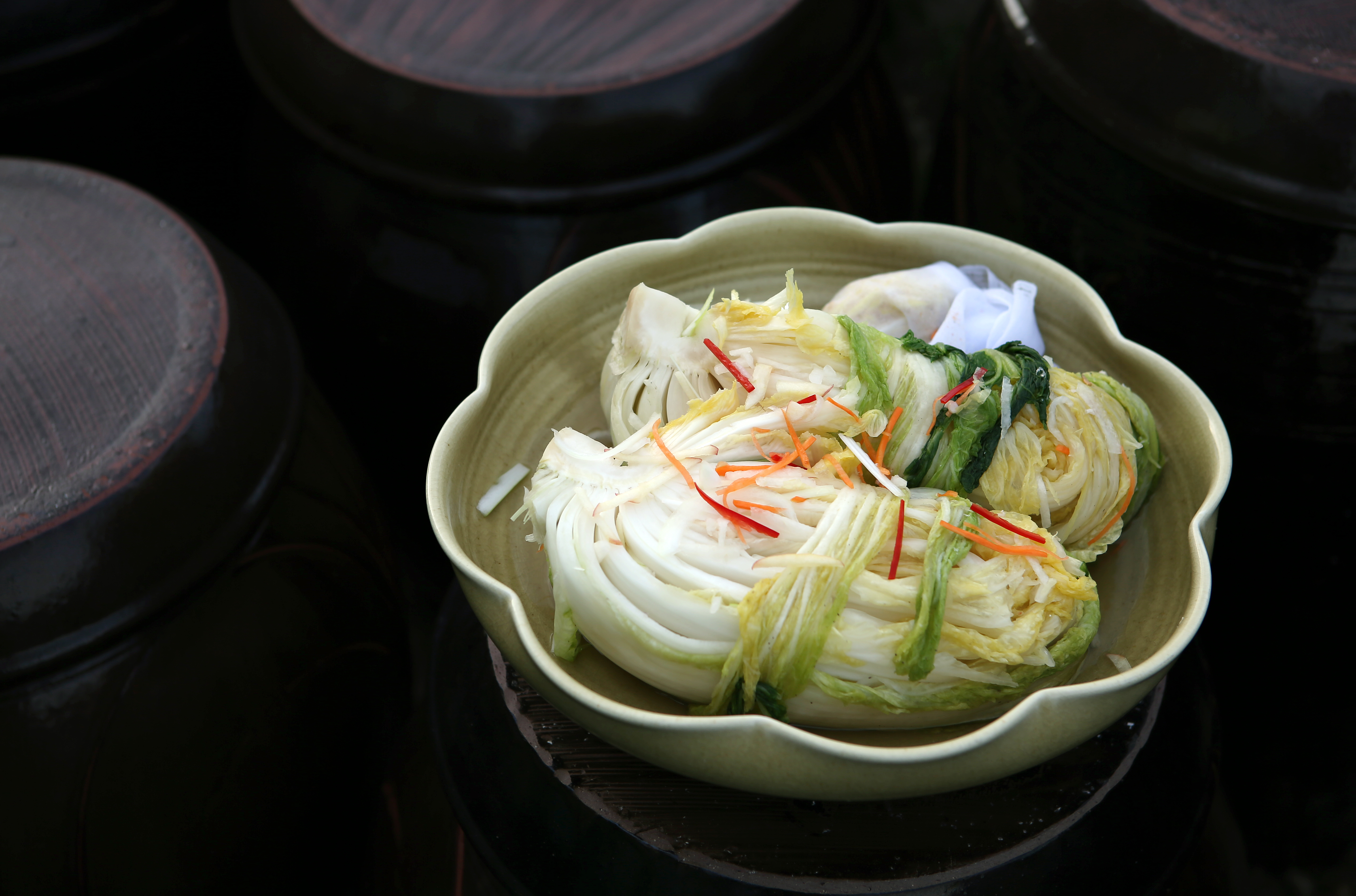
- Alternative names: White kimchi
- Type: Kimchi
- Place of origin: Korea
- Main ingredients: Napa cabbage

Korean name
- Hangul: 백김치
- Hanja: 白김치
- RR: baekgimchi
- MR: paekkimch'i
- IPA: pɛ̝k̚.k͈im.tɕʰi

Baek-kimchi (Korean: 백김치) or white kimchi is a variety of kimchi made without the chili pepper powder commonly used for fermenting kimchi in Korean cuisine. Baek kimchi has a mild and clean flavor, which appeals to children and the elderly, to whom the regular kimchi might be too spicy. Baek kimchi consists of salted napa cabbage, radish, minari, spring onions, Korean pear, chestnuts, jujube, ginger, garlic, salt, sugar, and a little bit of chili threads as garnish.

Baek kimchi's mild flavor and crunchy texture makes it a good appetizer when people order main dishes consisting of beef such as galbi or bulgogi at Korean restaurants. It is also used as a wrap for baek kimchi bossam.

== Nutrition ==
Baek-kimchi contains nutrients such as vitamin C, minerals, lactic acid bacteria, and it is high in fiber. Baek-kimchi has shown to also reduce the risk of cancer, obesity, and diabetes. The reason is that fermented foods contain "good" bacteria that can improve the way the body absorbs and reacts to nutrients and food. Specifically, the lactic acid bacteria in baek-kimchi have been linked to improvements in intestinal diseases and disorders such as irritable bowel syndrome. Due to the high amount of lactic acid bacteria as well as dietary fiber and probiotics, coupled with the lack of spices in baek-kimchi, it can help greatly reduce the inflammation that causes intestinal distress. Other positive effects that baek-kimchi can have on one's gut is reducing the chance of ulcers. Having "good" gut bacteria can also help improve brain function as the nervous system communicates with all parts of the body.

While baek-kimchi is useful for intestinal diseases, it can also help to lower cholesterol and aid in weight loss. In a study, those who have eaten fermented baek-kimchi for three months experienced lower cholesterol levels than those who did not. Additionally, overweight or obese participants in the study who were given fermented kimchi lost body fat over a three-month period. Baek-kimchi also reduced the risk of metabolic diseases, such as cardiovascular disease, in these participants as well. Baek-kimchi helped to maintain good fats while aiding in participants' weight loss.

Baek-kimchi contains many vitamins, such as vitamin A, which promotes and helps maintain healthy eyesight. The probiotics and other antioxidants found in baek-kimchi can also help the body fight off infections and also boost the immune system. Baek-kimchi also contains isocyanate and sulfide, which can aid in helping a person's organs detoxify and get rid of heavy metals that could cause cancer. Other health benefits that come with making baek-kimchi part of one's diet include healthy hair and skin, which may also improve one's mental well-being. Baek-kimchi has also been linked to an increase in energy for those who have made it a regular part of their diet.

Among its health benefits, baek-kimchi is also low in calories and high in iron and protein. A single serving of baek-kimchi, which is one cup, has about 23 calories, 2 grams of protein, less than 1 gram of fat, 4 grams of carbohydrates, 2 grams of sugar, 2 grams of fiber, and 747 milligrams of sodium. It also makes up 21% of a person's daily iron intake.

== See also ==
- Dongchimi – Short-maturing Korean vegetable pickle
- Nabak-kimchi – Variant of the Korean dish kimchi
