= Perennial (disambiguation) =

A perennial is a plant that lives for more than two years.

Perennial or perennials may also refer to:

- Perennial, the Gardeners' Royal Benevolent Society, a British charity
- Harper Perennial, a paperback imprint of HarperCollins Publishers
- Perennial (Vera Blue album), by Vera Blue, 2017
- Perennial (Woods album), by Woods, 2023
- Perennial philosophy, a spiritual philosophy
- Perennial (terminology), a mindset of a group of people who share common interests
- "Perennials", a song by the American band Bright from their self-titled album
