= Perennial (terminology) =

Perennial (terminology) defines a mindset of a group of people who share common interests. The term is often used as a form of categorization based on psychographics and like-mindedness over demographic categorizations such as location, age, economic background, social background, or ethnic background.

== Etymology ==
According to media reports, Gina Pell, a technology writer and entrepreneur, introduced the idea and coined the term in October 2016 in a post on Medium which was syndicated by Fast Company. The word quickly gained attention from media. According to her, the term is used to describe the approach to life embraced by the new generation regardless of their age. According to MSNBC, the term derived as a criticism against the term Millennials, which categorize groups of people according to birth dates.

== Arts and culture ==
According to Billboard, "examples of Perennials in music, those whose music transcends age demographics, are plentiful [including] acts like Adele, Lorde, Rolling Stones, U2 and John Legend and, most notably, Lady Gaga’s collaboration with Tony Bennett." American writer Dave Eggers described the term "Perennial" in the San Francisco Chronicle as "a refreshing way to think about people who continue to inspire us over long periods of time. [The term has] a certain civic engagement that energizes other people, and the reinvention aspect is interesting. This tends to keep people relevant and tough to pinhole — people like Carrie Mae Weems, Yo-Yo Ma or Alice Waters."
