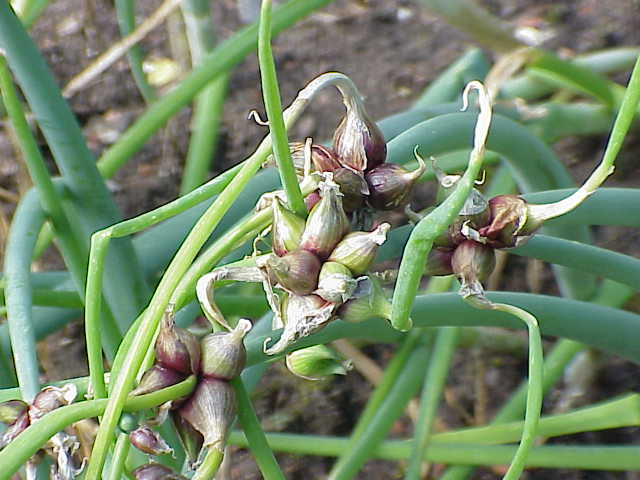
- Onion stalks with bulblets, or miniature onions grown at the top of the stalk

Scientific classification
- Kingdom: Plantae
- Clade: Tracheophytes
- Clade: Angiosperms
- Clade: Monocots
- Order: Asparagales
- Family: Amaryllidaceae
- Subfamily: Allioideae
- Genus: Allium
- Species: A. × proliferum

Binomial name
- Allium × proliferum (Moench) Schrad. ex Willd.

Synonyms
- Allium cepa var. proliferum (Moench) Regel; Allium fistulosum var. viviparum Makino; Allium fistulosum f. viviparum (Makino) M.Hiroe; Allium multitabulatum S. Cicina; Allium × wakegi Araki; Cepa × prolifera Moench; Allium cepa x fistulosum

= Tree onion =

Species of flowering plant

The tree onion (Allium × proliferum) is a perennial plant similar to the common onion (A. cepa), but with a cluster of bulblets where a normal onion would have flowers. Tree onions are also known as spring onions, green onions, topsetting onions, walking onions, or Egyptian onions. Genomic evidence has suggested that they may be a diploid hybrid of the shallot and the Welsh onion (A. fistulosum). Other sources treat the tree onion as A. cepa var. proliferum or A. cepa Proliferum Group.

Tree onion bulblets will sprout and grow while still on the original stalk. The bulblets are usually marble-sized, between 0.5 cm to 3 cm in diameter. They may bend down under the weight of the new growth and take root some distance from the parent plant, giving rise to the name "walking onion". It has been postulated that the name "Egyptian onion" derived from Romani people bringing tree onions to Europe from the Indian subcontinent. The phenomenon of forming bulblets (bulbils) instead of flowers is also seen in top-setting garlic and other alliums, which sometimes may also be referred to as top onions or tree onions.

Also known as turfed stone leek, it may be cultivated commercially and for foliage. It is described as a shallot which can be grown in tropical conditions.

Many tree onions are very strong flavoured, although some cultivars are relatively mild and sweet. The underground bulbs are particularly tough-skinned and pungent, and can be quite elongate, like leeks, or in some types may form bulbs up to 5 cm across. Young plants may be used as scallions in the spring, and the bulblets may be used in cooking similarly to regular onions, or preserved by pickling.

== Culinary use ==
=== Japan ===
The plant is known as wakegi (ワケギ) "split scallion" in Japan. Considered a specialty of the Hiroshima Prefecture, it is used in local cooking similar to other scallions.

=== Korea ===
In Korea, Allium × proliferum along with A. fistulosum is called pa (파, "scallion"), while common onions are called yangpa (양파, "Western scallion"). While A. × proliferum is called jjokpa (쪽파, "separated scallion"), A. fistulosum is called either daepa (대파, "big scallion") or silpa (실파, "thread scallion") depending on the size. Unlike daepa and silpa, which are usually used as a spice, herb, or garnish, jjokpa is often used as the main ingredient of various scallion dishes in Korean cuisine. Common dishes made with jjokpa include pajeon (scallion pancakes) and pa-kimchi (scallion kimchi).

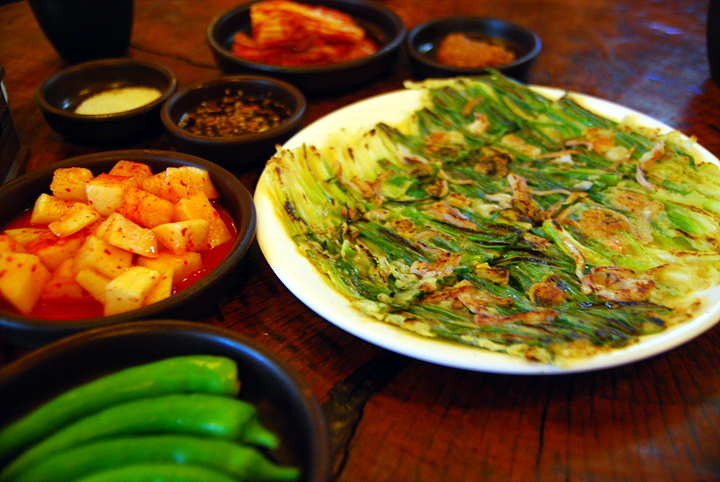
Haemul-pajeon (scallion pancake with seafood)

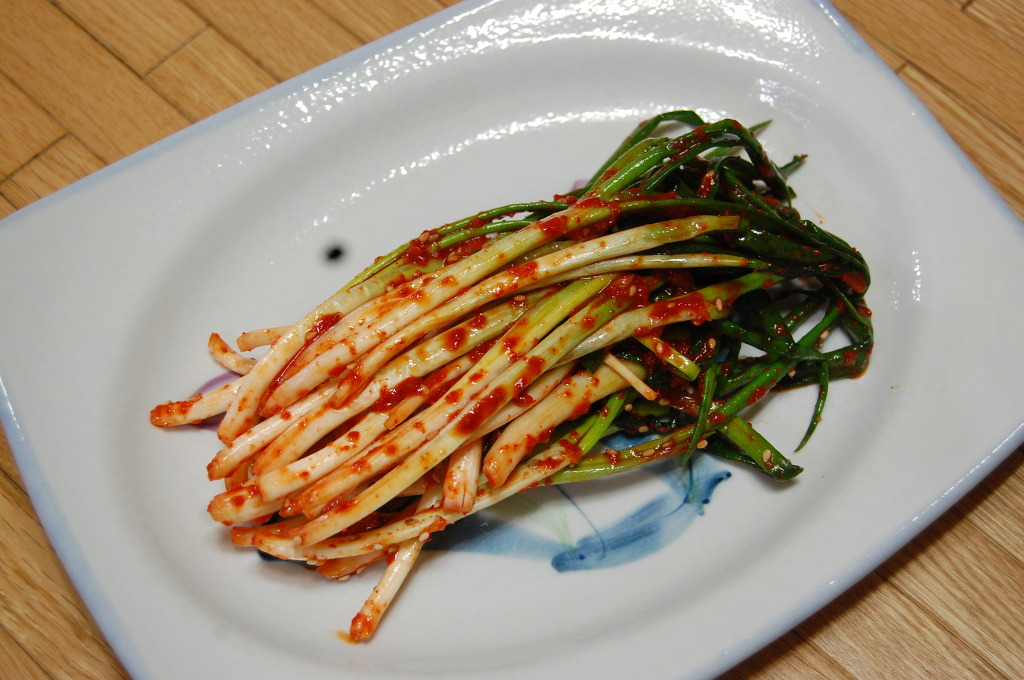
Pa-kimchi (scallion kimchi)

== Gallery ==
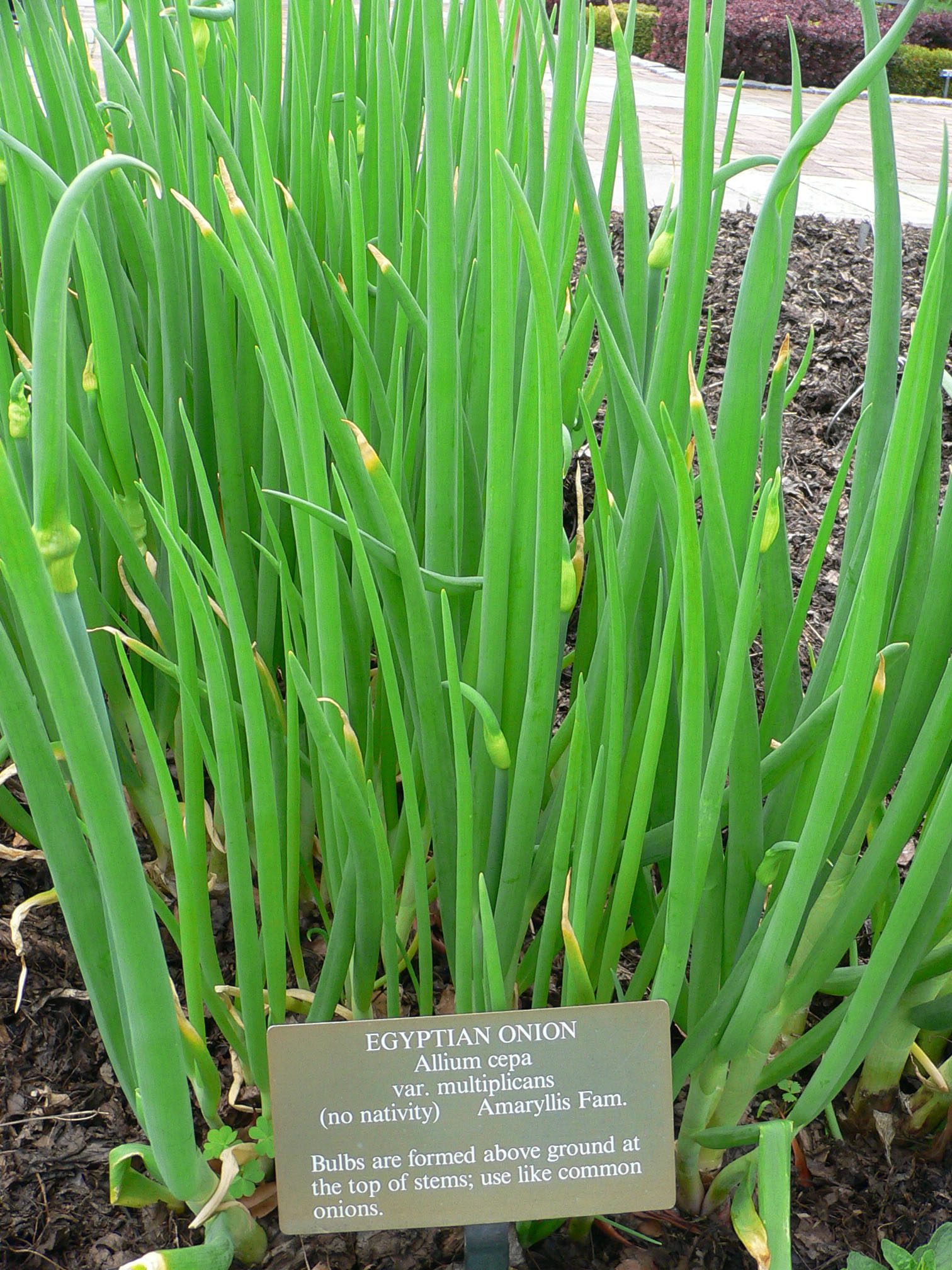
Egyptian onions

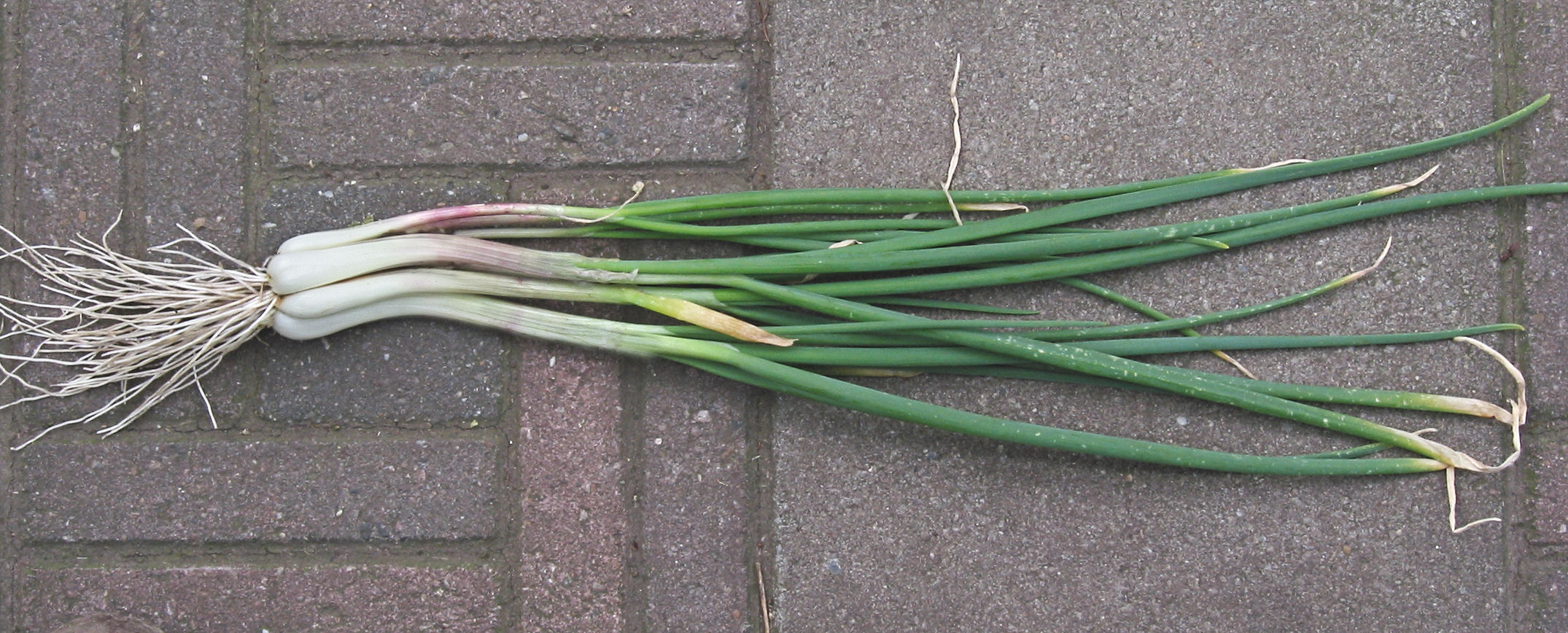
Tree onion

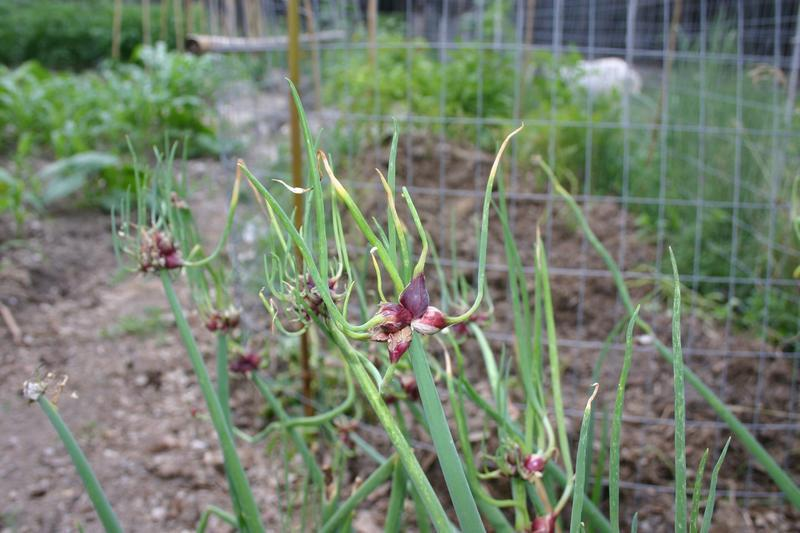
Growing in a garden

== See also ==
- List of Allium species
- Scallion
