= Kimchi refrigerator =

Refrigerator dedicated to fermenting or storing kimchi

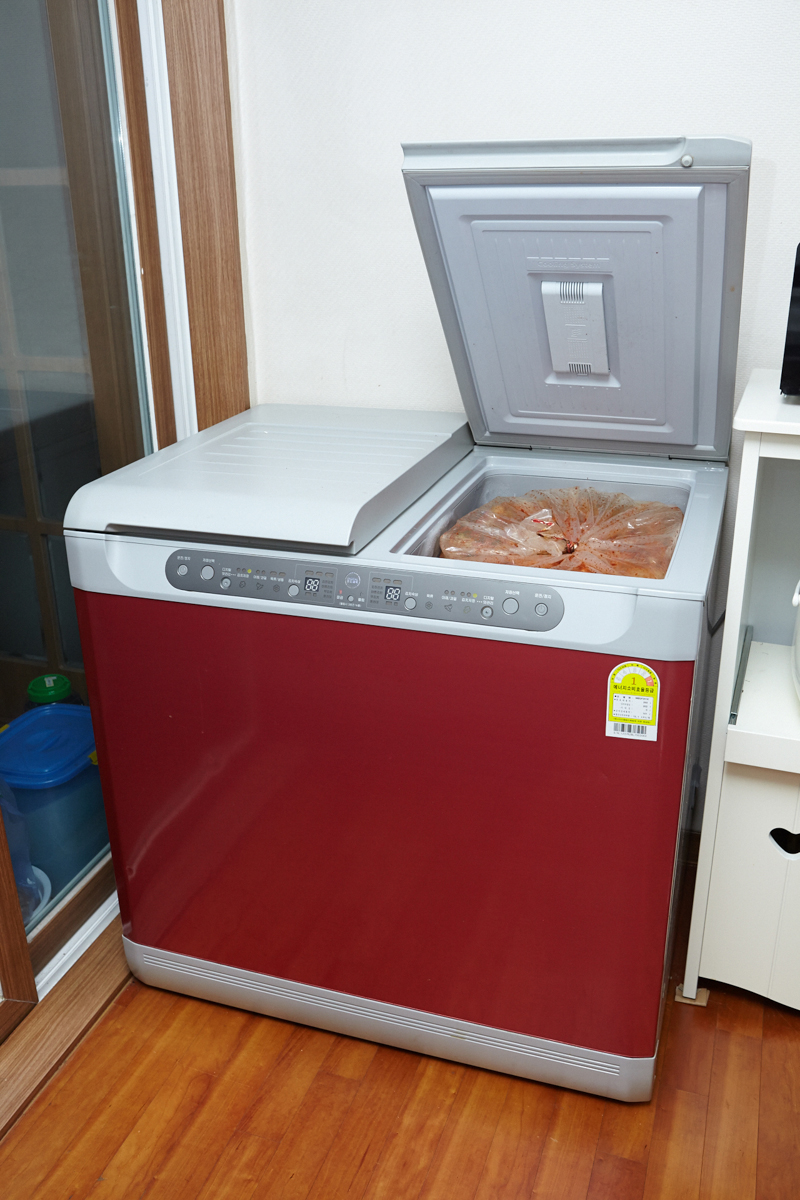

Korean name
- Hangul: 김치냉장고
- Hanja: 김치冷藏庫
- RR: gimchi naengjanggo
- MR: kimch'i naengjanggo

A kimchi refrigerator is a refrigerator designed specifically to meet the storage requirements of kimchi and facilitate different fermentation processes. The kimchi refrigerator aims to be colder, with more consistent temperature, more humidity, and less moving air than a conventional refrigerator, providing the ideal environment for fermentation of kimchi. Some models may include features such as a UV sterilizer.

In a consumer survey aimed at South Korean homemakers conducted by a top-ranking Korean media agency in 2004, the kimchi refrigerator was ranked first for most wanted household appliance.

== History and design ==
The start of the Kimchi refrigerator dates back to 1984. At that time, LG predecessor, GoldStar (금성사), first used the word 'Kimchi refrigerator' (김치 냉장고). The model name of the first kimchi refrigerator was 'GR-063', and according to the advertisement, the inside was made of stainless steel and the internal temperature could be set, but it is assumed that the direct cooling method was adopted. The volume of this product was 45 liters.

After many years of comprehensive work on development to best suit kimchi fermentation and storage, WiniaMando (만도기계) launched the commercial brand DIMCHAE (딤채) into the mass market in December 1995. The model name was 'CFR-052E'.

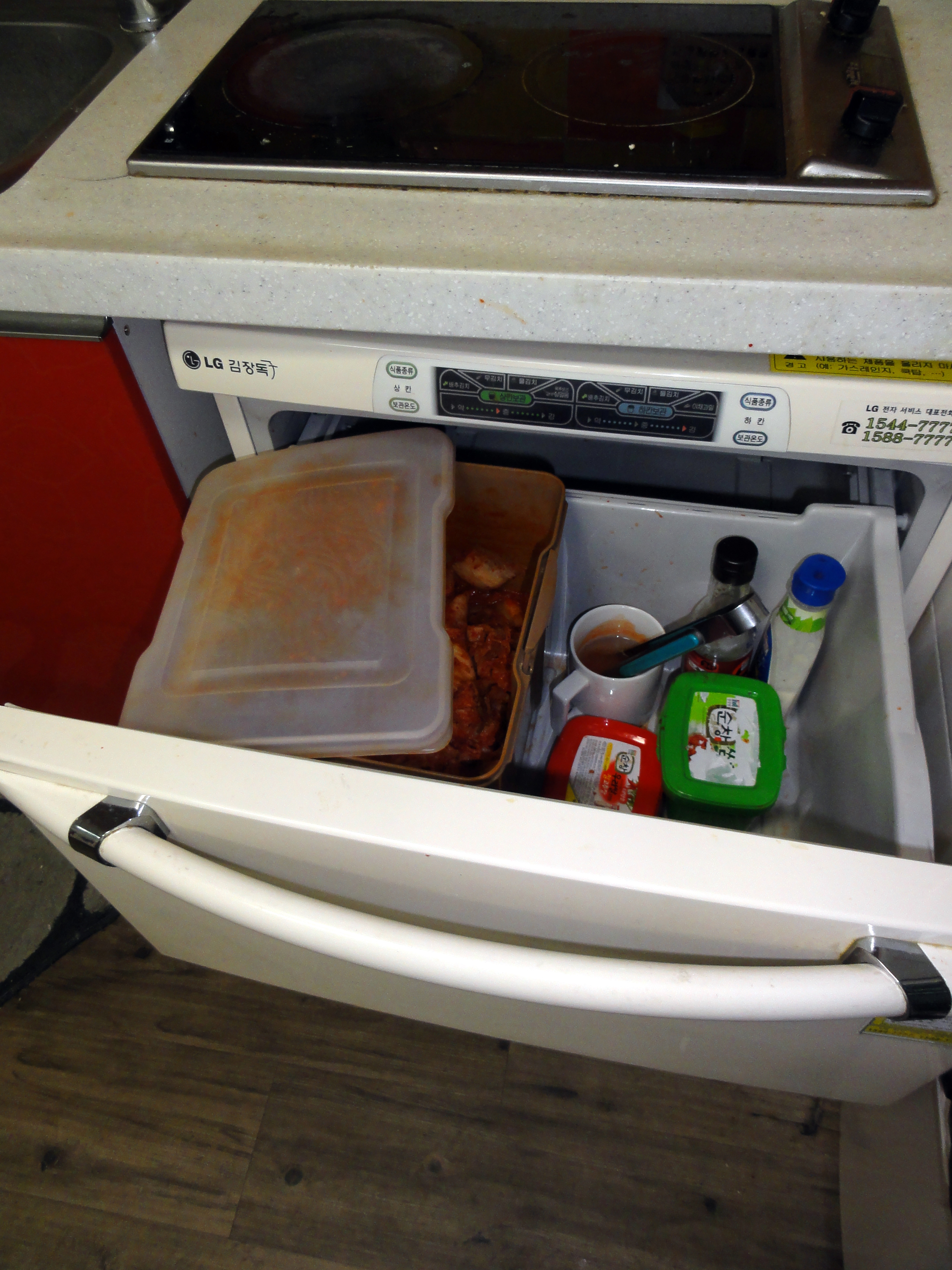
Compact single-drawer Kimchi refrigerator

As of November 2007, more than a dozen home appliance manufacturers, including Samsung and LG, were involved in commercial production of kimchi refrigerators.

The top-loading or "lid-type" designs were introduced first. The initial design took up much space and heavy plastic kimchi containers had to be lifted to get to the bottom part. Some units are now designed instead with two deep drawers on the bottom, that are accessible from the outside. Top or bottom, the bins can be used to refrigerate anything from kimchi to fresh produce and meats.

The door-drawer types (the "stand-type" in Korea) are gaining popularity because of their space-saving ergonomic design. A single door with a wine-bar type design at the top can be opened in full or partially at the wine-bar section to save energy. The top portion can be used as a freezer.
