= Spring greens (broad term) =

Edible plants best consumed in spring

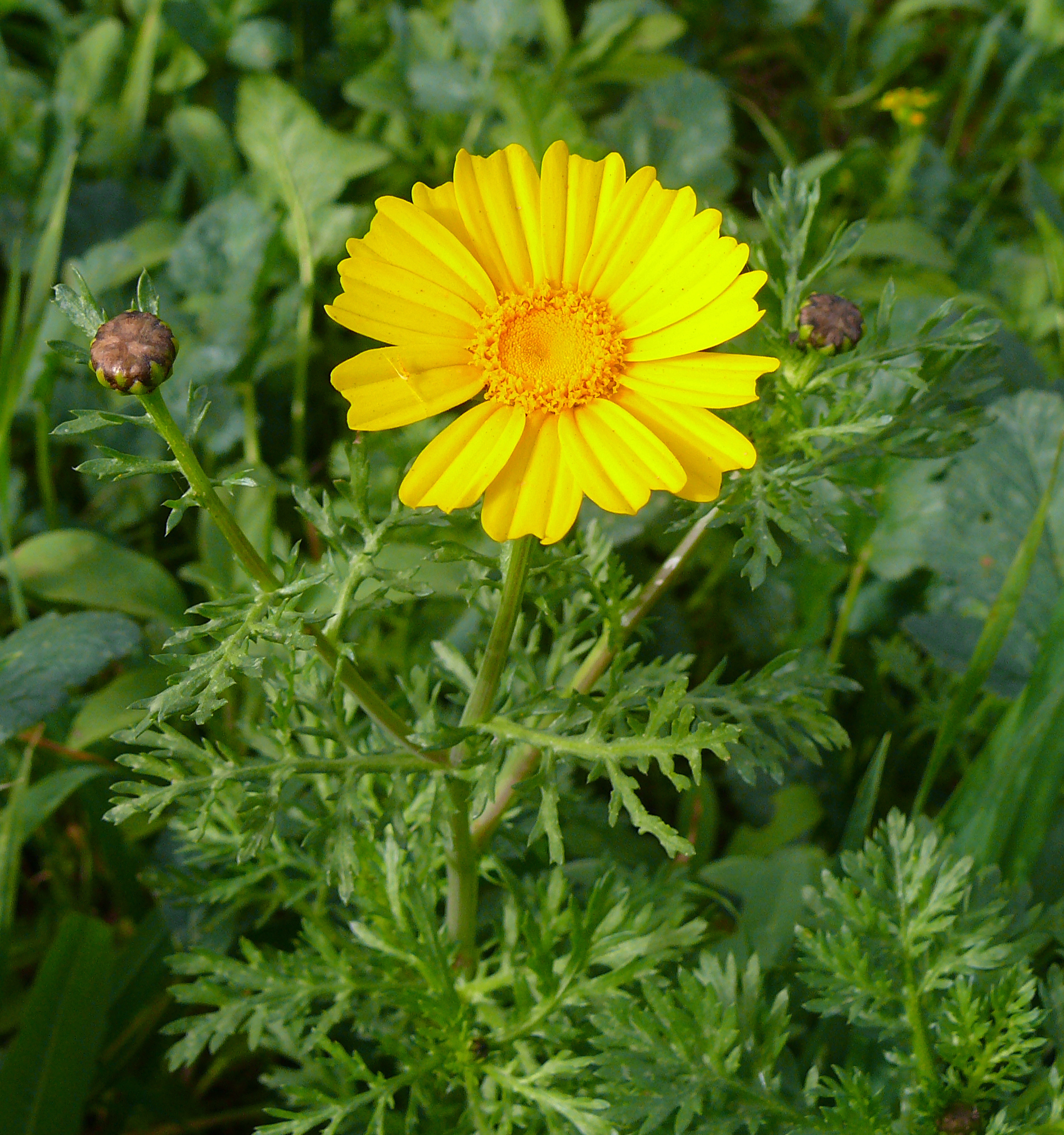
Edible varieties of chrysanthemum are enjoyed in the spring in many parts of the world including the Mediterranean, East Asia, and parts of North America

tender, edible leaves and shoots that appear early in the growing season, whether cultivated, self-sown or foraged

Spring greens are tender, edible young leaves or new plant growth that appear early in the growing season, whether cultivated or foraged. Many leaf vegetables become less edible as they age and bitter, or potentially even toxic, compounds start to form.

Around the world, there are many festivals, customs, and traditions associated with these herbs. Spring greens have often been crucial to bridging the hungry gap.

== Cultural significance ==
Spring greens carry deep cultural and symbolic significance across global traditions.

=== East Asia ===
In Japan, it is custom to eat nanakusa-gayu, a rice porridge dish made of seven early greens, during the Nanakusa-no-sekku (Seven Herbs Festival) held every January 7th. The seven herbs are seri, nanazuna, hahakogusa, hakobe, koonitabirako, suzuna (or kabu), and suzushiro.

In Korea, bom-namul refers to the tender wild greens harvested just as winter ends across Korea's fields and mountains. These include naengi, Korean wild chive (dallae), ssuk, mountain aster (chwi-namul), Aralia elata shoots (dureup), saebal-namul, and cham-namul.

=== Europe ===
In northern Europe, spring greens were essential to sustaining people through the hungry gap when the previous year's food stores had run out but newly planted crops had not finished growing. Fast-growing wild weeds like stinging nettle, dandelion, chickweed, fat hen, watercress, sea beat, and alexanders—as well as wild alliums like garlic and chives.

In modern UK and Ireland, "spring greens" has come to refer to a specific commercial vegetable. Some cabbages are harvested early before the head forms and sold as loose, dark green leaves. Historically, cabbages were planted densely together and every alternate cabbage was harvested early as a spring green—giving the remaining cabbage crops more room to grow. These greens usually come from true heading cabbages and are distinct from the collard greens which are a staple in the US, East Africa, and other parts of the world.

In Liguria (modern Italy), prebuggiun is a traditional mixture of spring greens that can contain anywhere between 7 to 23 distinct species. Some core greens include borage, bladder campion, sow thistle, and wall rocket.

In Greece, horta refers to wild or cultivated greens often cooked together into a dish by the same name. Commonly featuring glistrida, avronies, radikia (wild dandelion or chicory greens), lapatho, vlita (Amaranthus blitum and other Amaranthus species), sinapi, and styfno.

=== North America ===
Harvesting of spring vegetables is common across Native American cultures.

In Mexico, quelites (derived from the Nahuatl word quilitl), refers to the tender wild greens that emerge in milpas after the first spring rains.

== Foraging ==
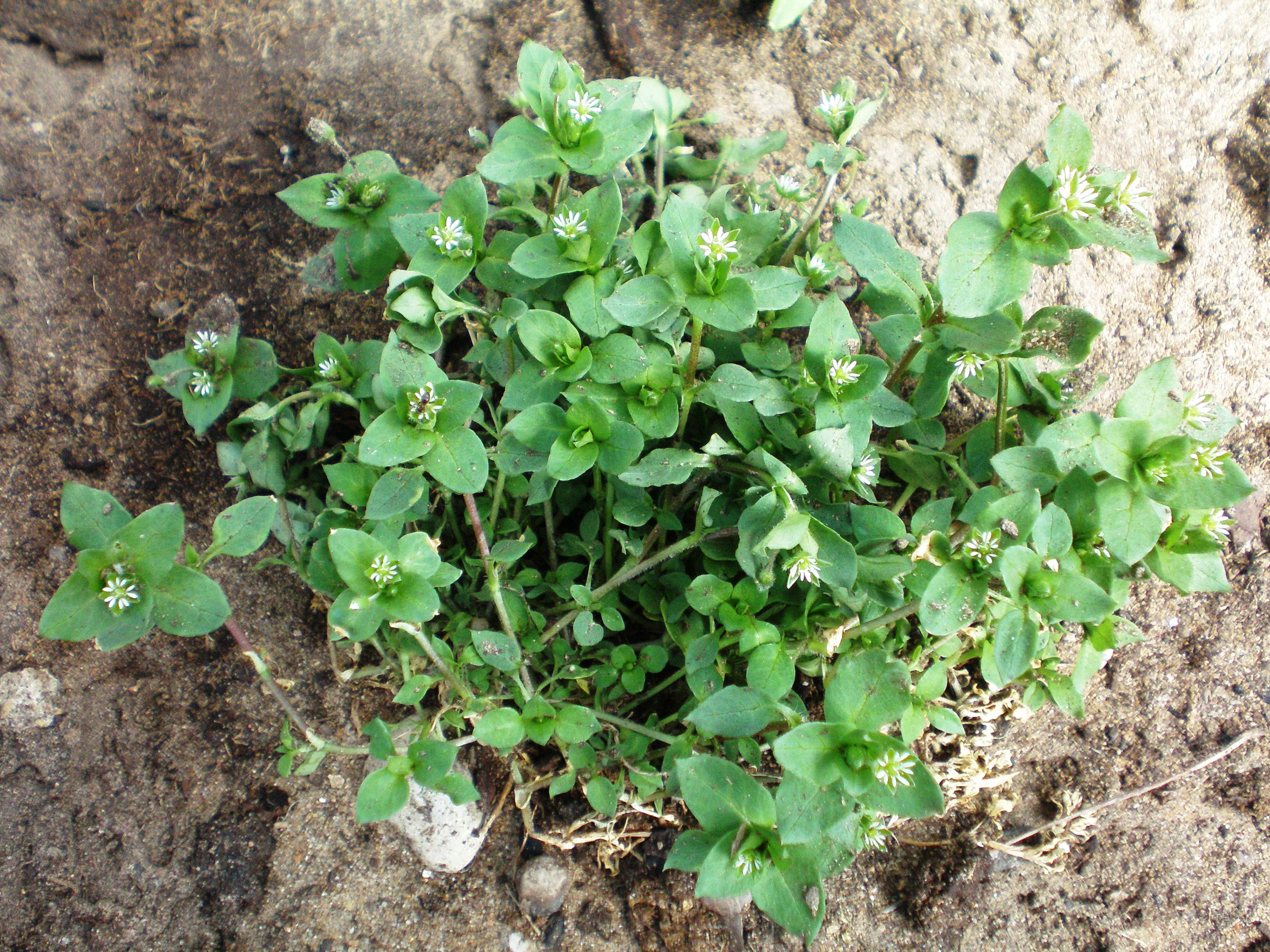
Chickweed plant growing wild

Since most leaf vegetables are very difficult to store and keep well, commercial production and distribution requires a high amount of pollution and plastic waste. Foraging for spring greens has been proposed as a possible way to reduce the impacts of demand for commercial greens.

However, it is important for foragers to take the necessary precautions and understand the risks. Many spring greens grow as "weeds" throughout the world in disturbed habitats. Plants growing in soils contaminated with heavy metals or pesticides can accumulate those pollutants (at different proclivities for different species). In addition, the misidentification of species may often lead to consumption of poisonous and toxic plants. This can generally be mitigated by a familiarity with the plants of one’s region, specifically the desired vegetable, and any lookalikes.

== Examples of spring greens ==
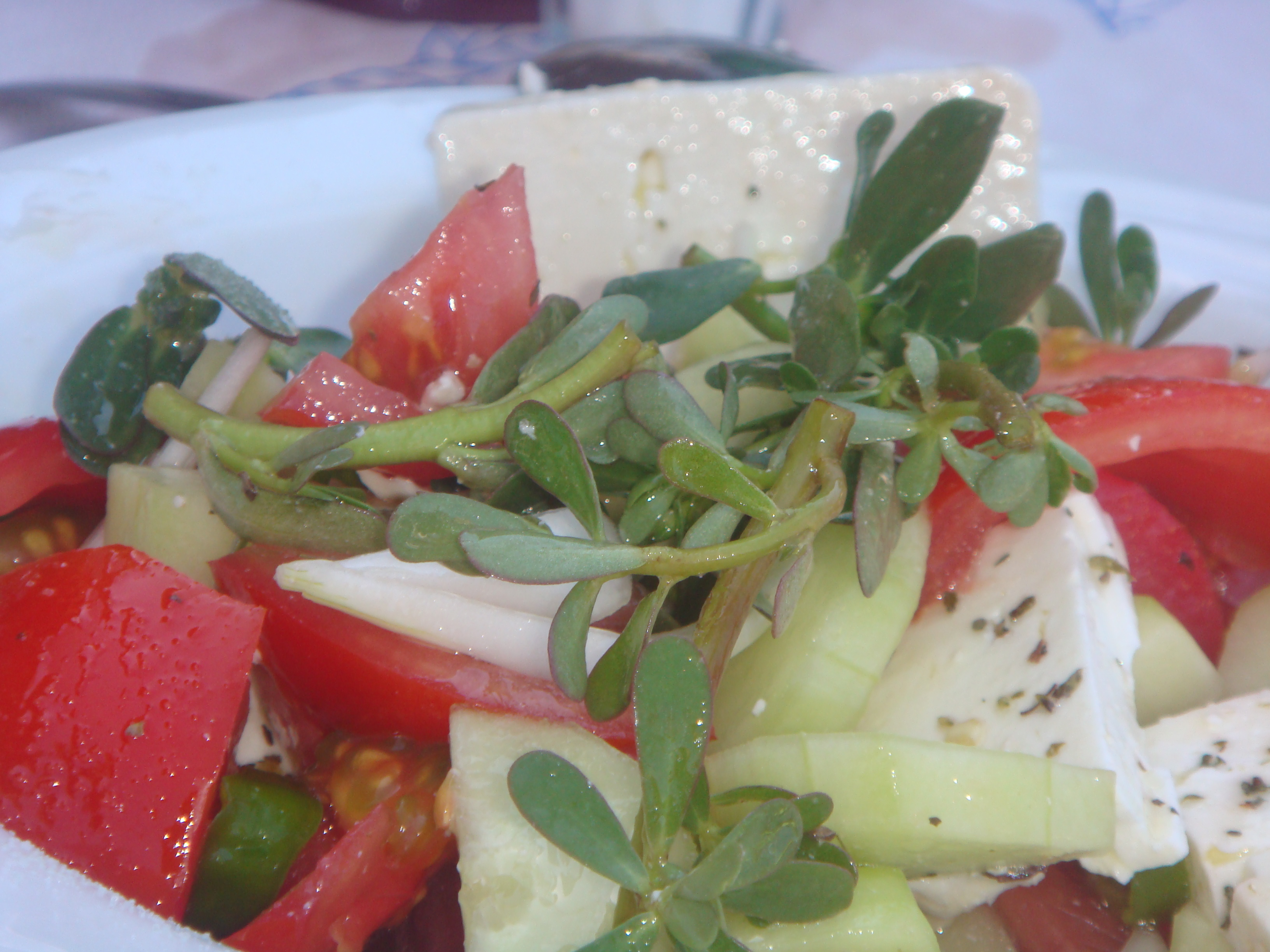
Purslane being eaten in a Greek salad

- Rubus spp. — the tender spring shoots of certain brambles (Rubus species) (e.g. salmonberry and thimbleberry) are eaten by many Native American tribal communities like many Coast Séliš peoples (e.g. Muckleshoot). These "sprouts" are only available for a few weeks unless you travel Northwards.
- Stellaria media — chickweed is native to Eurasia but naturalized throughout the world, often growing as a weed. New growth is trimmed off from March through April. When it's too mature, it has a stringy or tough texture.
- Galium spp. — cleavers are common throughout temperate zones of both hemispheres. Some species seeds' also contain caffeine and are used as a coffee substitute. Young leaves can be eaten raw or cooked, but older leaves become too fibrous for eating.
- Taraxacum officinale — dandelions have a long history of culinary usage. The leaves contain many vitamins and nutrients important for human health. Young tender leaves can be pinched from the center of the plants but older leaves become extremely bitter as they are exposed to more and more sunlight.
- Helwingia japonica — a Japanese helwingia. Young leaves, as well as flowers, are eaten and/or cooked.
- Cryptotaenia canadensis — young leaves and stems of honewort are boiled or used as a seasoning similar to parsley.
- Chenopodium album — lamb's quarters commonly grow as "weeds" throughout the world, but are cultivated in Northern India and many other parts of the world. Leaves from wild plants can be harvested spring to early summer. They are best when young, but can also be harvested from the top of the plant later in the season. They are used in salads, pesto sauces, soups, and more.
- Portulaca oleracea — purslane is found throughout the world. It can be eaten fresh, stir-fried, or added to soups.
- Urtica dioica — stinging nettles are native to Eurasia and Western Africa, but are now found worldwide. They are (usually) covered in hollow stinging hairs that inject histamine when handled. However, these hairs can easily be neutralized by boiling, scorching, or even drying them out.
- Viola spp. — most violet species have edible leaves (and flowers) and are at their most palatable in the spring. However, leaves usually contain saponins and so can cause digestive upset if eaten in large quantities.
- Oxalis stricta — wood sorrel leaves are edible. However, they contain oxalic acid which causes them to be tart and should not be consumed in large quantities.

== See also ==
- Bom-namul
- Foraging
- List of leaf vegetables
- Microgreens
- Potherb
- Salad
- Sansai
- Horta (food)
- quelites
- Sprouting
