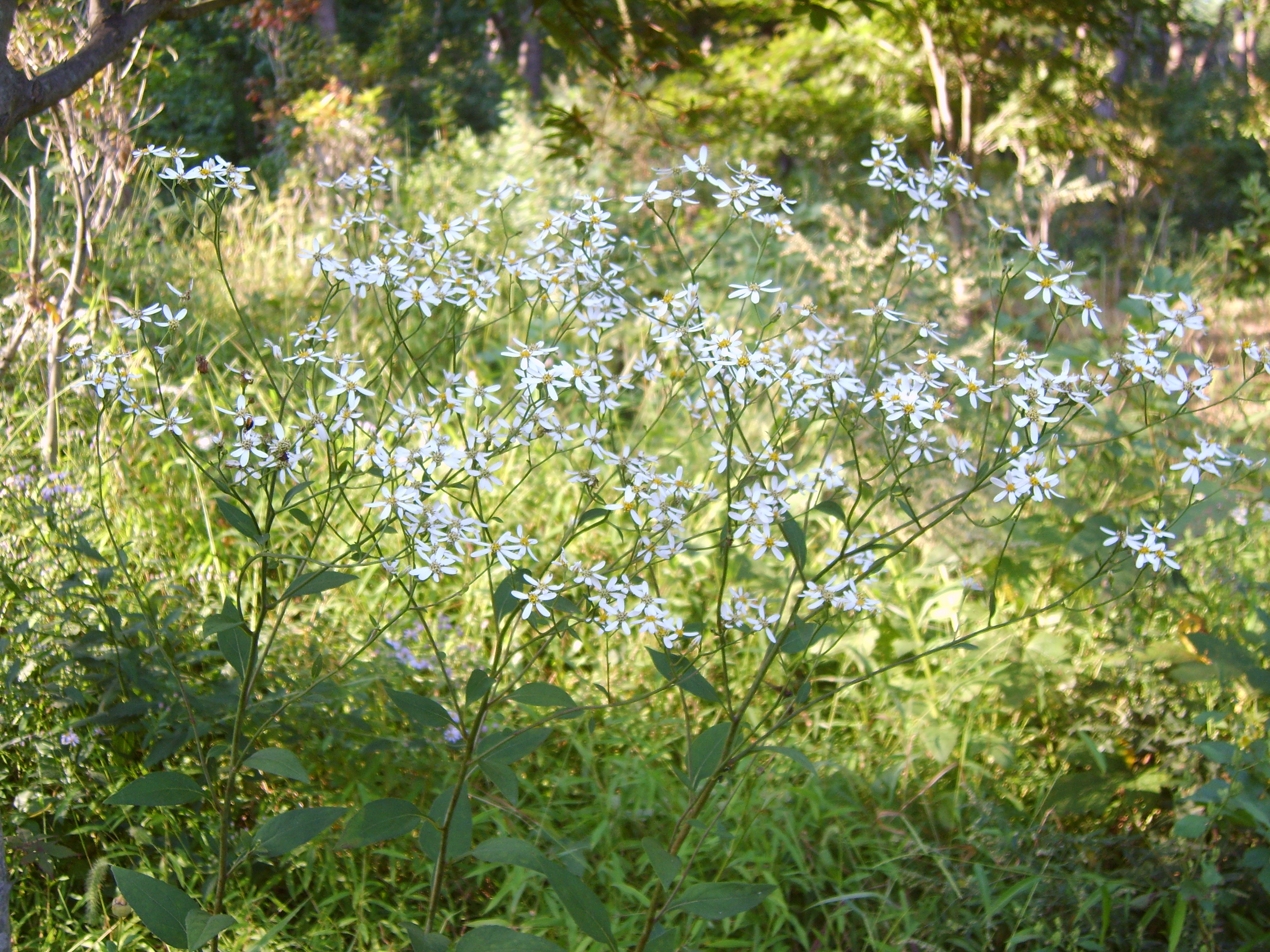

Scientific classification
- Kingdom: Plantae
- Clade: Tracheophytes
- Clade: Angiosperms
- Clade: Eudicots
- Clade: Asterids
- Order: Asterales
- Family: Asteraceae
- Genus: Doellingeria
- Species: D. scabra

Binomial name
- Doellingeria scabra (Thunb.) Nees

Synonyms
- Aster scaber

= Doellingeria scabra =

Species of plant

Doellingeria scabra is a perennial herb of the family Asteraceae from Eurasia. It is frequently found in wild mountain regions of Korea, eastern Russia, China, and Japan.

== Distribution ==
Doellingeria scabra is native to Eurasia. It is actively cultivated in temperate regions of Korea for varying uses.

== Habitat and ecology ==
Doellingeria scabra is found in woods and thickets, especially on hills and low mountains. Forest clearings and warm temperate areas suit it well. Moist soil and sunny conditions are ideal for this plant. It can be cultivated in lightly sandy, loamy, or clay soils with adequate drainage and cannot grow in the shade.

== Description ==
Doellingeria scabra grows up to 1.2 meters (4 ft) tall. Its stems stand erect. Its hermaphroditic flowers bloom between August and October. Its seeds ripen between September and November. Insect pollinators such as bees and flies aid pollen exchange. It is capable of self-fertilization. The green leaves are cordate-shaped and have palmate venation. Leaf edges are serrated–jagged and resemble saw blades. Trichomes can be found all over its surface.

== Use ==
=== Culinary ===
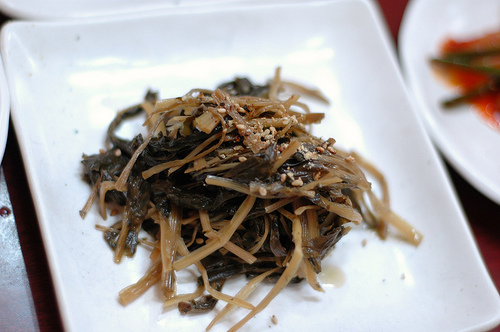
Chwinamul-muchim (seasoned chwinamul)

==== Korea ====
Doellingeria scabra thrives in the dry mountain ranges of Korea. It is known for its distinctive fragrance and taste, and is frequently used in Korean cuisine. Known among locals for its medicinal use, studies show it contains many beneficial compounds. Its Korean name is chamchwi (참취, "true chwi"), and it is often simply referred to as chwinamul by the Korean locals.

Either stir-fried or blanched, it is often used as the main ingredient of herbal side dishes called namul. Blanched chamchwi can be pounded with rice and steamed to make a variety of tteok (rice cake), called chwitteok. Stir-fried chamchwi can be used as a wrapping vegetable in a ssam (wrap) dish called chwissam, wrapping pork and other vegetables and tied with wild chives. Sometimes, fresh chamchwi is brined and made into water kimchi with liquorice broth, called chamchwi-kimchi. It is also one of the ingredients that frequently feature in bibimbap recipes. It can be used as a flavoring herb in kimchi, rice, and even Korean-style Italian pasta dishes.
