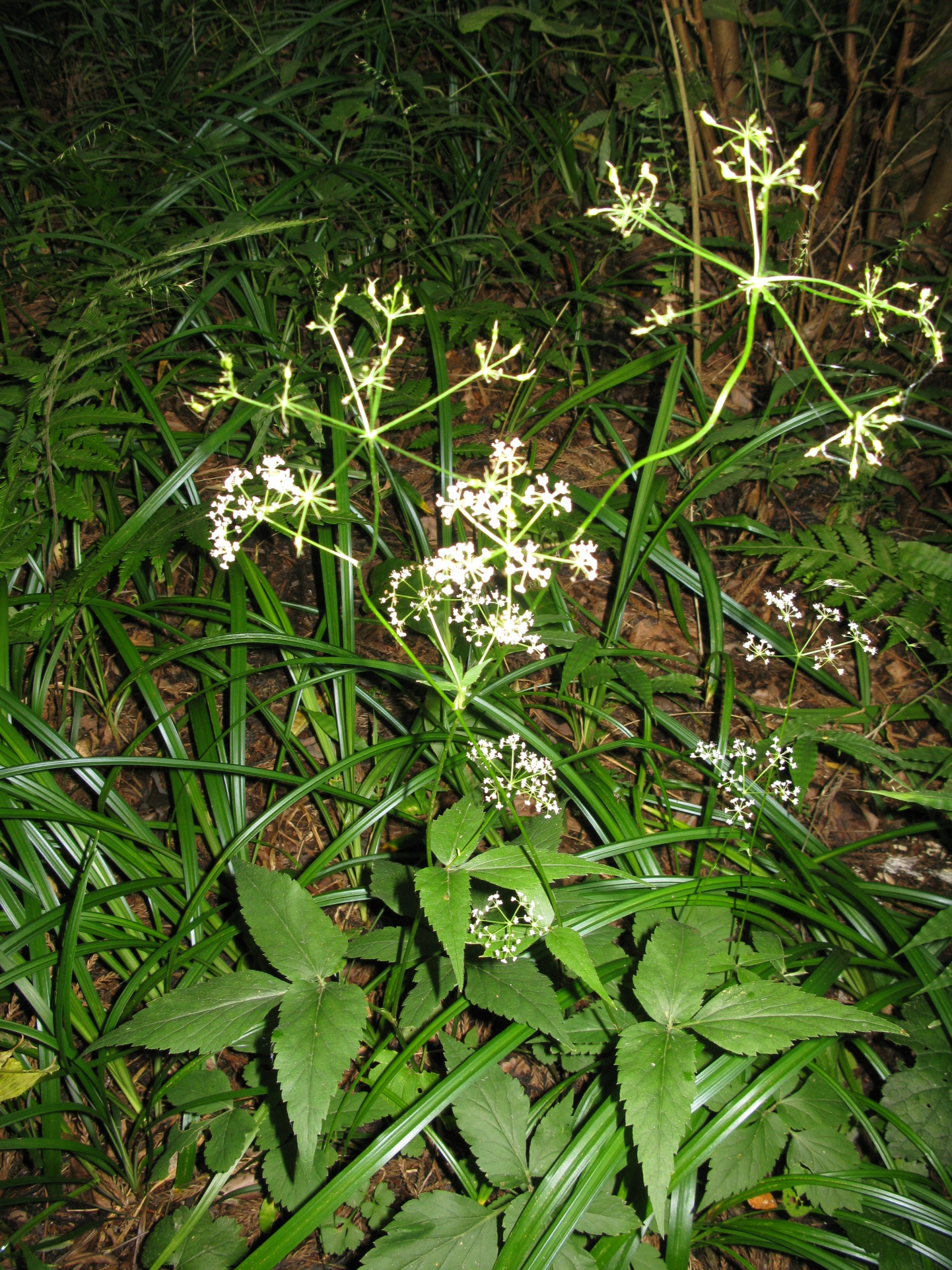
- Spuriopimpinella calycina

Scientific classification
- Kingdom: Plantae
- Clade: Tracheophytes
- Clade: Angiosperms
- Clade: Eudicots
- Clade: Asterids
- Order: Apiales
- Family: Apiaceae
- Subfamily: Apioideae
- Genus: Spuriopimpinella (H.Boissieu) Kitag.

= Spuriopimpinella =

Genus of flowering plants

Spuriopimpinella is a genus of flowering plants belonging to the family Apiaceae.

Its native range is Southern Russian Far East to China and Japan.

Species:

- Spuriopimpinella arguta (Diels) X.J.He & Z.X.Wang
- Spuriopimpinella brachycarpa (Kom.) Kitag.
- Spuriopimpinella brachystyla (Hand.-Mazz.) Kitag.
- Spuriopimpinella calycina (Maxim.) Kitag.
- Spuriopimpinella komarovii Kitag.
- Spuriopimpinella nikoensis (Y.Yabe ex Makino & Nemoto) Kitag.
