= Namul =

Assortment of Korean vegetable dishes

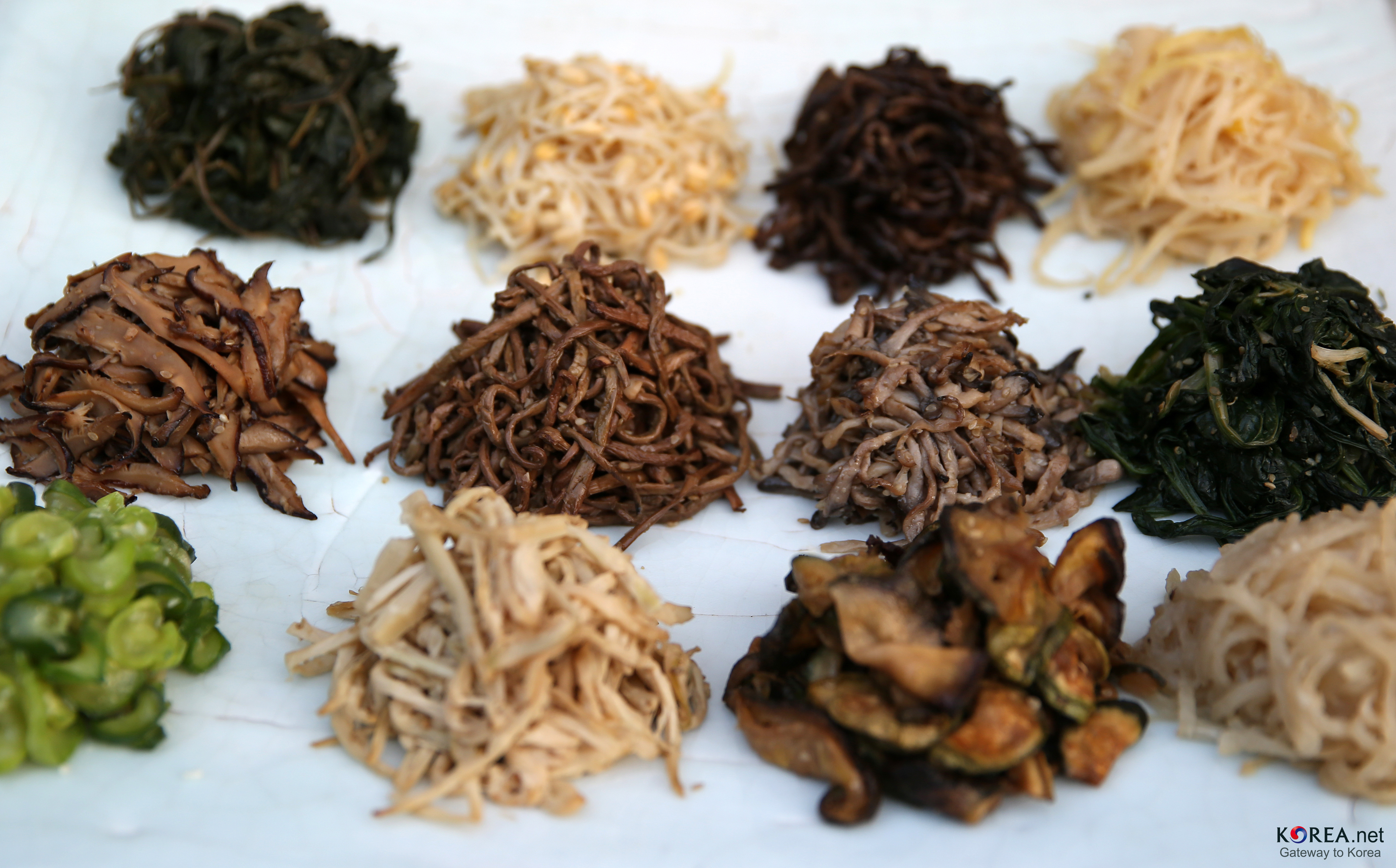

Korean name
- Hangul: 나물
- RR: namul
- MR: namul
- IPA: [na.mul]

Namul (Korean: 나물) refers to either a variety of edible greens or leaves or seasoned herbal dishes made of them. Wild greens are called san-namul (산나물; lit. mountain namul), and spring vegetables are called bom-namul (봄나물; lit. spring namul). On the day of Daeboreum, the first full moon of the year, Koreans eat boreum-namul (보름나물; lit. full moon namul) with five-grain rice. It is believed that boreum namuls eaten in winter help one to withstand the heat of the summer to come.

== Preparation and serving ==
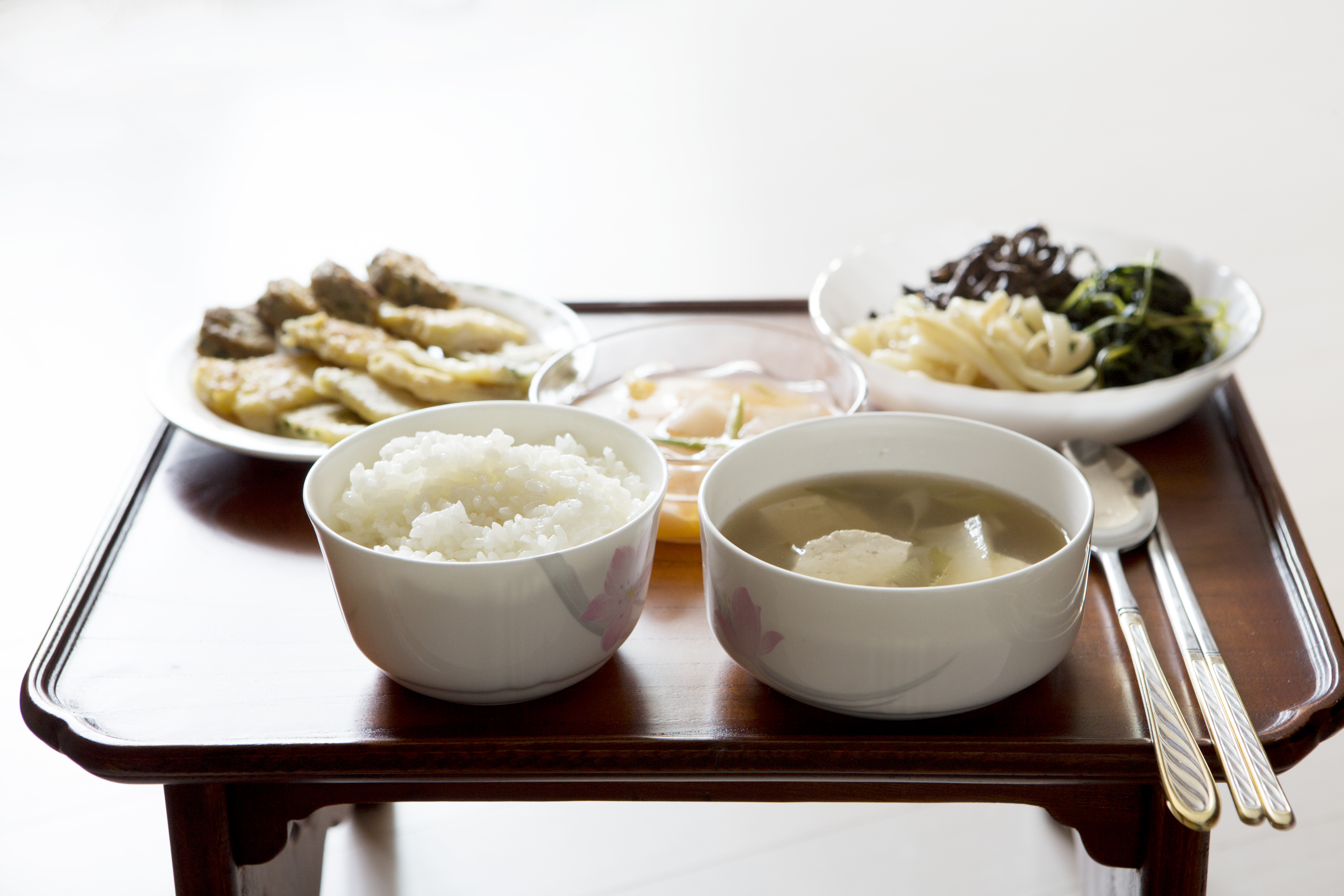
A single-person bapsang (meal table) with bap (cooked rice), guk (soup), kimchi, pyeonyuk (meat slices), and three namul banchans (spinach namul, brackenfern namul, and balloon flower root namul)

For namul as a dish, virtually any type of vegetable, herb, or green can be used, and the ingredient includes roots, leaves, stems, seeds, sprouts, petals, and fruits. Some seaweeds and mushrooms, and even animal products such as beef tendons are also made into namuls. Although in most cases the vegetables (and non-vegetable namul ingredients) are blanched before being seasoned, the method of preparation can also vary; they may be served fresh (raw), boiled, fried, sautéed, fermented, dried, or steamed. Namul can be seasoned with salt, vinegar, sesame oil and perilla oil, regular soy sauce and soup soy sauce, doenjang (soybean paste), gochujang, and many other spices and condiments.

Namul are typically served as banchan (반찬; a side dish accompanying staples such as rice). It is possible to have more than one type of namul served as a banchan at a single meal. Each namul dish may be named depending on the main ingredients and the methods of preparation. For example, a seasoned chamnamul dish is most likely called chamnamul-muchim (참나물무침; lit. seasoned chamnamul), since the name of the vegetable already contains the word "namul" in it. A namul dish made of raw radish is called musaengchae (무생채; lit. seasoned raw radish) since it is usually the namul dish made with cooked radish that is called munamul (radish namul).

== Varieties ==
=== Vegetables ===
- aehobak (애호박, Korean zucchini)
- bak (박, calabash)
- banga (방아, Korean mint)
- bangpung (방풍, coastal hogfennel)
- bean sprouts
  - kongnamul (콩나물, soybean sprout)
  - sukjunamul (숙주나물, mung bean sprout)
- bireum (비름, edible amaranth)
- bomdong (봄동)
- buchu (부추, garlic chive)
- chamnamul (참나물, short-fruit pimpinella)
- chopi (초피, Korean pepper)
- chwinamul (취나물)
  - chamchwi (참취)
  - gomchwi (곰취, Fischer's ragwort)
  - seodeolchwi (서덜취, large-flower saussurea)
- dallae (달래, Korean wild chive)
- daraesun (다래순, hardy kiwi tree shoot)
- deodeok (더덕, lance asiabell)
- dolnamul (돌나물, stringy stonecrop)
- doraji (도라지, balloon flower root)
- dureup (두릅, Korean angelica tree shoot)
- eumnamusun (음나무순, prickly castor oil tree shoot)
- gaji (가지, aubergine/eggplant)
- gat (갓, mustard green)
- geundae (근대, chard)
- kkaennip (깻잎, perilla leaves)
- kkwonguidari (꿩의다리, columbine meadow-rue)
- gobi (고비, Asian royal fern)
- godeulppaegi (고들빼기, sonchus-leaf crepidiastrum)
- gogumasun (고구마순, sweet potato shoot)
- gondeure (곤드레, Korean thistle)
- gosari (고사리, eastern brakenfern)
- gwangdaenamul (광대나물, henbit deadnettle)
- memil (메밀, buckwheat green)
- meowi (머위, giant butterbur stems)
- minari (미나리, Java waterdropwort)
- mindeullae (민들레, Korean dandelion)
- mu (무, Korean radish)
- musun (무순, radish sprout)
- myeongi (명이, Siberian onion)
- naengi (냉이, shepherd's purse)
- nogak (노각, old cucumber)
- oi (오이, cucumber)
- pa (파, scallion, spring/green onion)
  - daepa (대파, Asian leek)
  - jjokpa (쪽파, tree onion)
  - silpa (실파, young scallion)
- padeudeuknamul (파드득나물, East Asian wildparsley)
- pulsomdae (풀솜대, snowy false lily of the valley)
- samnamul (삼나물, goatsbeard)
- sebalnamul (세발나물, salt sandspurry)
- seomssukbujaengi (섬쑥부쟁이, Ulleungdo aster)
- sigeumchi (시금치, spinach)
- siraegi (시래기, dried radish green)
- sseumbagwi (씀바귀, toothed ixeridium)
- ssukgat (쑥갓, crowndaisy chrysanthemum)
- ssuk (쑥, Korean mugwort/wormwood)
- ttangdureup (땅두릅, herbal aralia)
- usannamul (우산나물, palmate shredded umbrella plant)
- wonchuri (원추리, daylily)
- yuchae (유채, rapeseed green)
- yunpannamul (윤판나물, Korean fairybell)
- yunpannamulajaebi (윤판나물아재비, common fairybell)

=== Seaweeds ===
- miyeok (미역, wakame)
- parae (파래, green laver)
- tot (톳, hijiki)

=== Mushrooms ===
- neutari (느타리, oyster mushroom)
- paengi (팽이, enoki mushroom)
- pyogo (표고, shiitake mushroom)
- songi (송이, matsutake mushroom)
- yangsongi (양송이, button mushroom)

=== Others ===
- gonyak (곤약, konjac jelly)
- muk (묵)
  - dotorimuk (도토리묵, acorn jelly)
  - memilmuk (메밀묵, buckwheat jelly)
  - nokdumuk (녹두묵, mung bean jelly)
    - cheongpomuk (청포묵, white mung bean jelly)
    - hwangpomuk (황포묵, yellow mung bean jelly)
- soesim (쇠심, beef tendons)

== Gallery ==
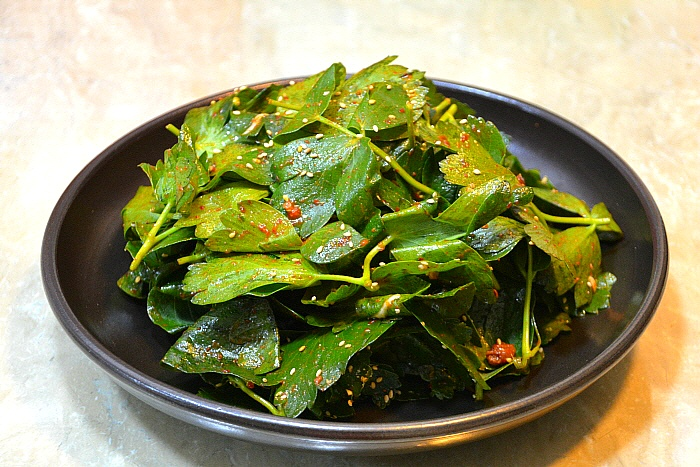
bangpung-namul

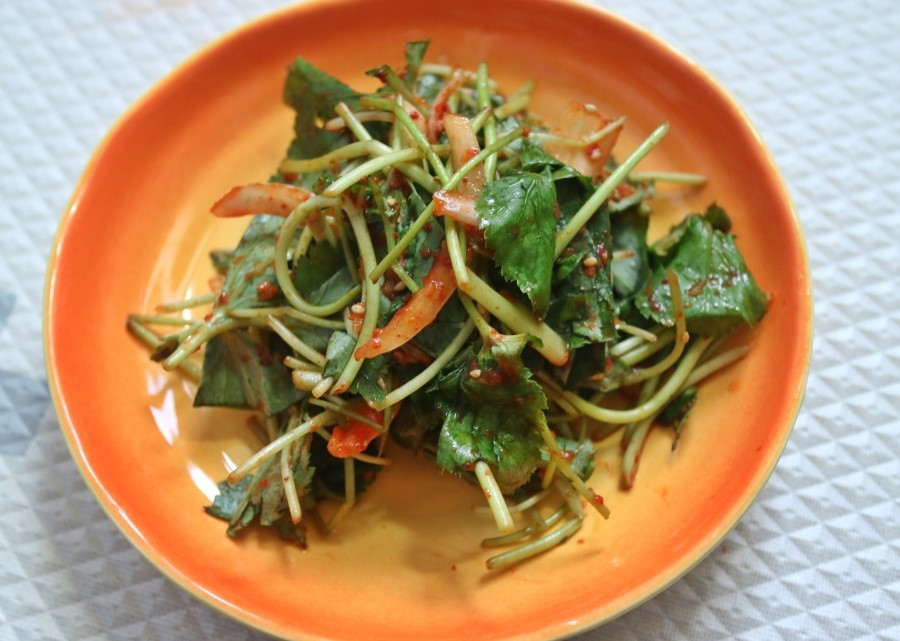
Chamnamul

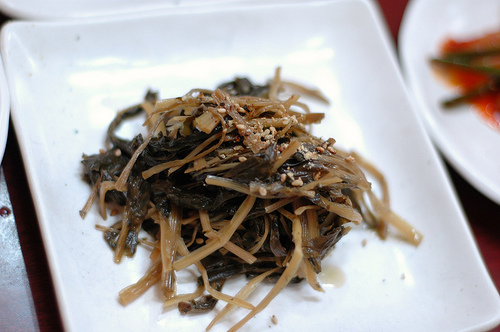
Chwinamul

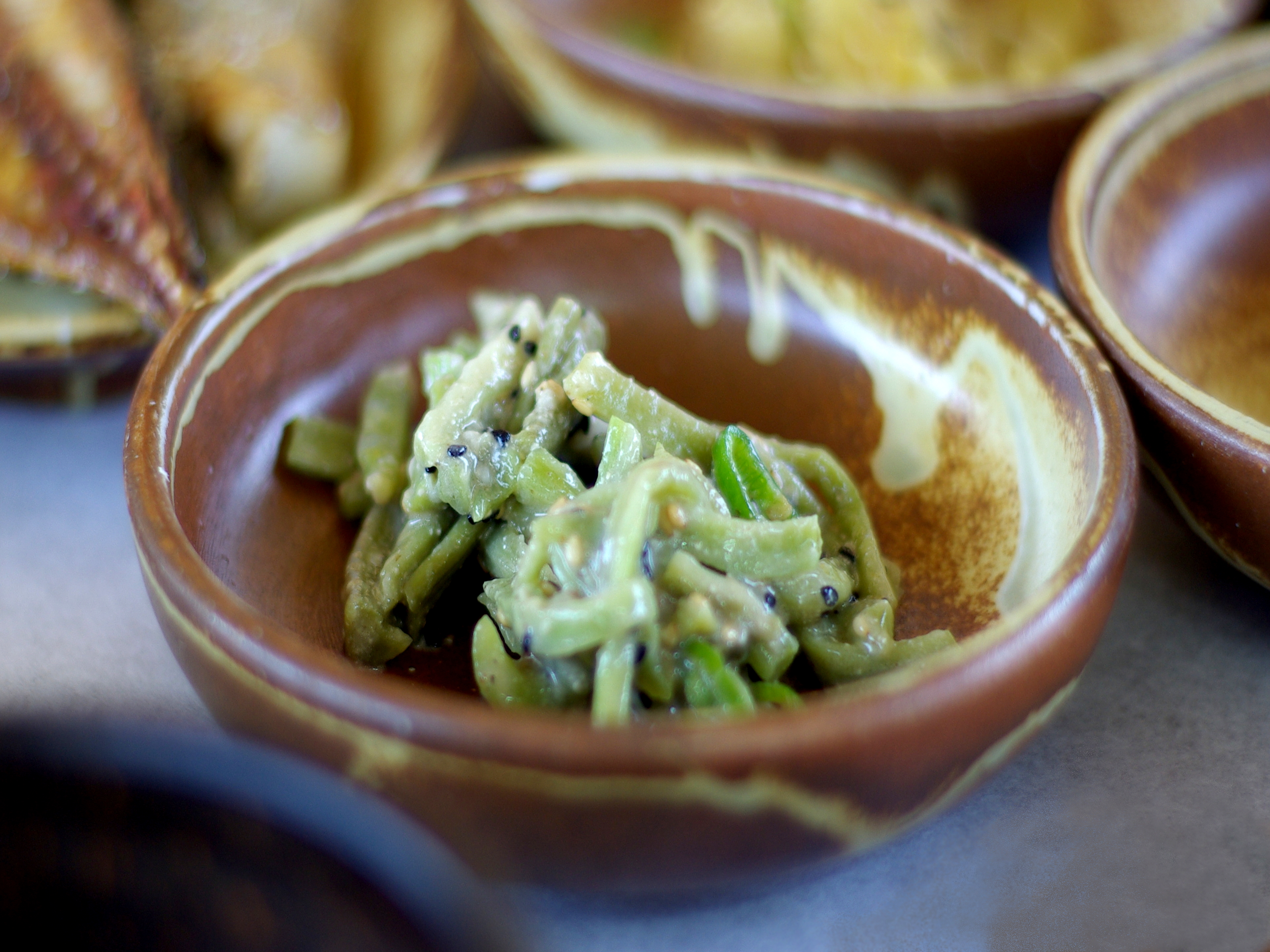
Goguma-sun-namul

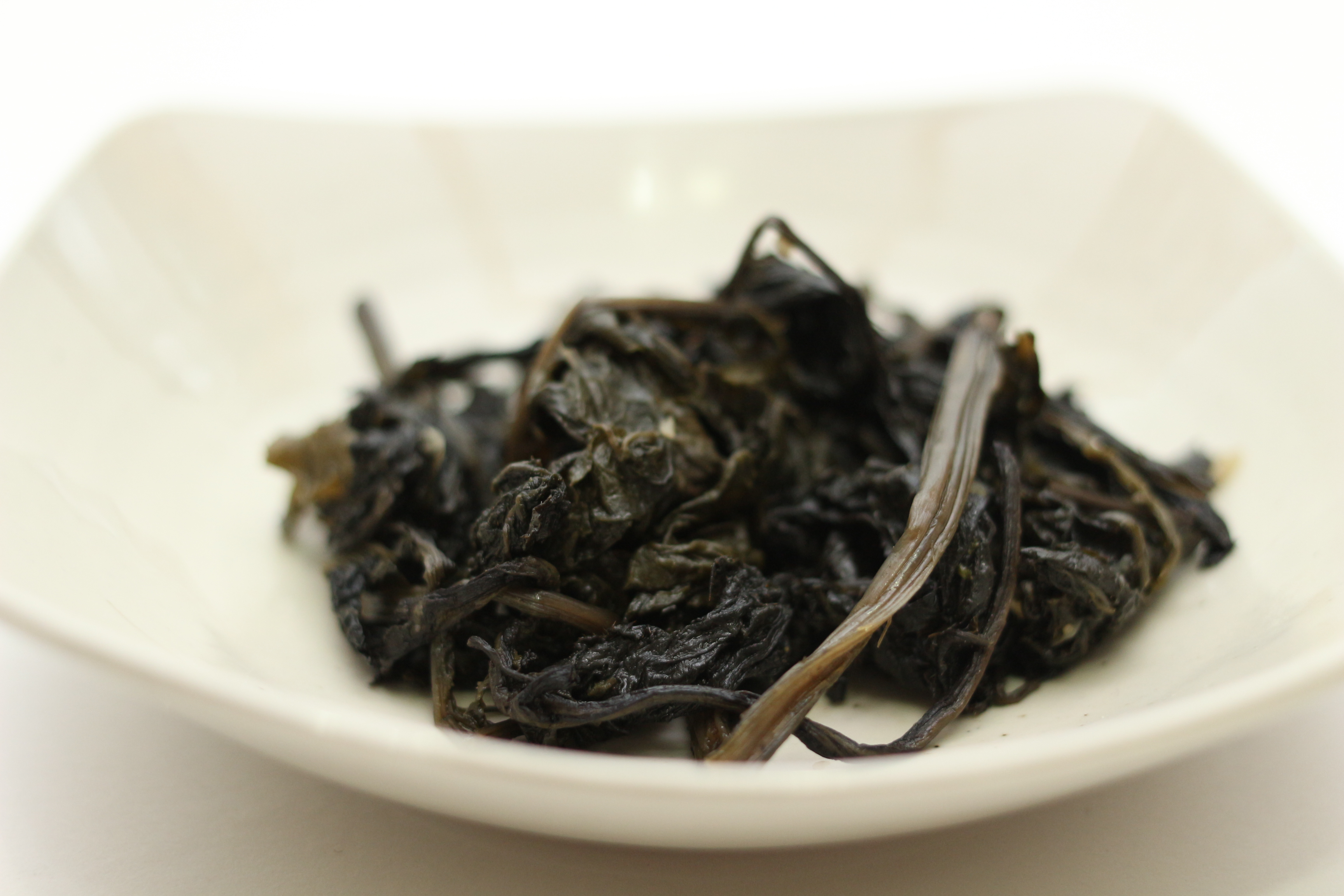
Gondeure-namul

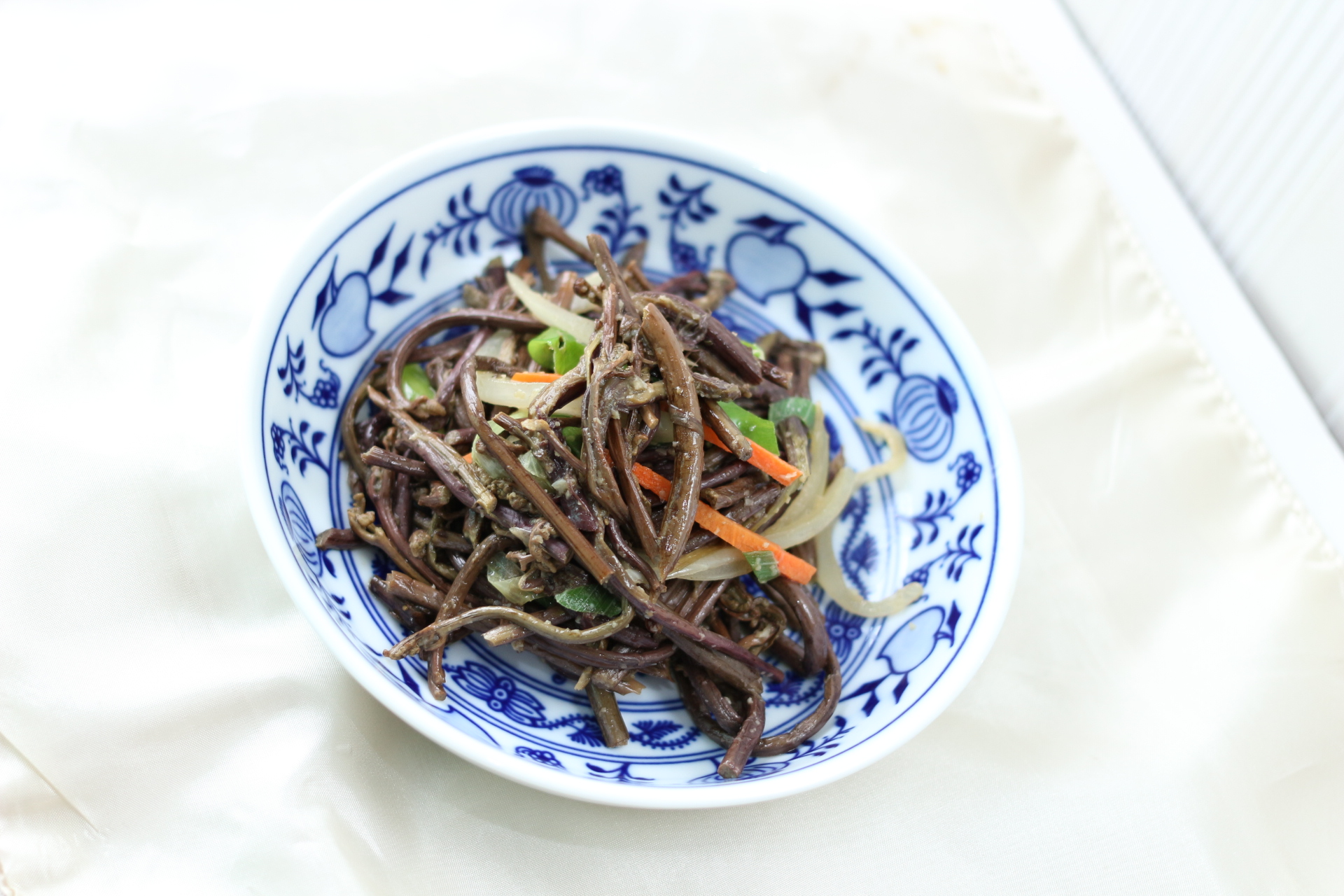
Gosari-namul

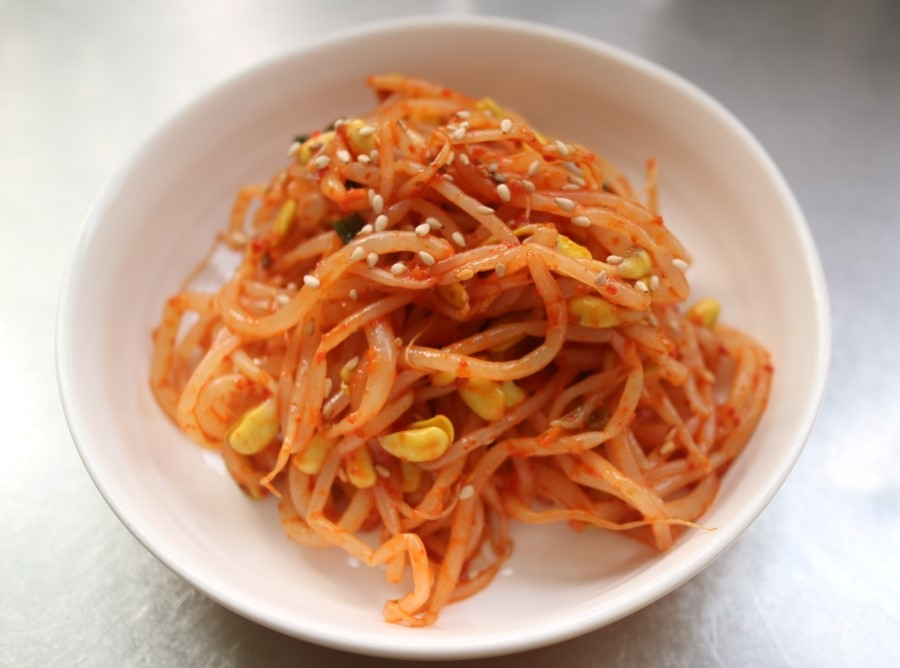
Kongnamul

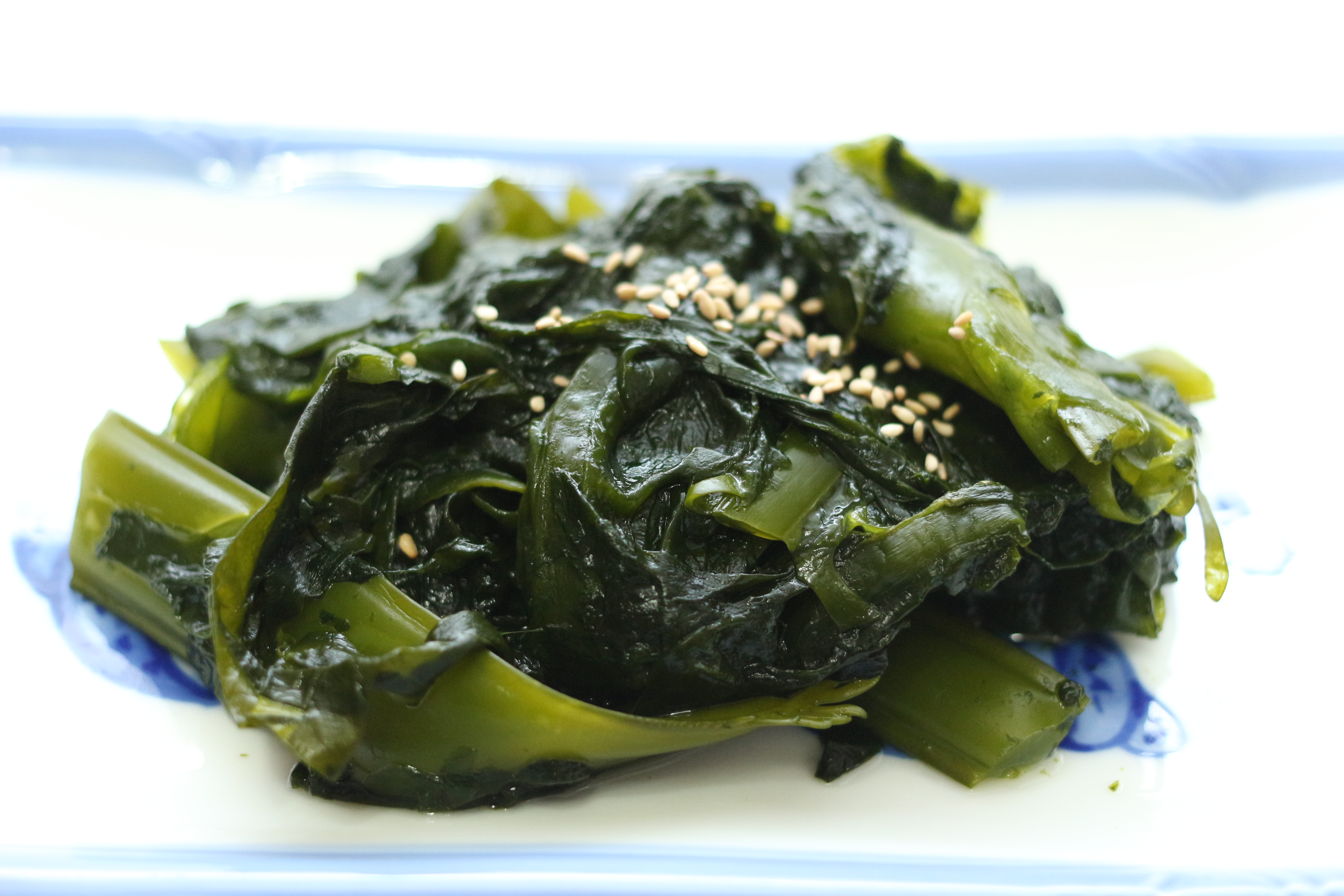
Miyeok-namul

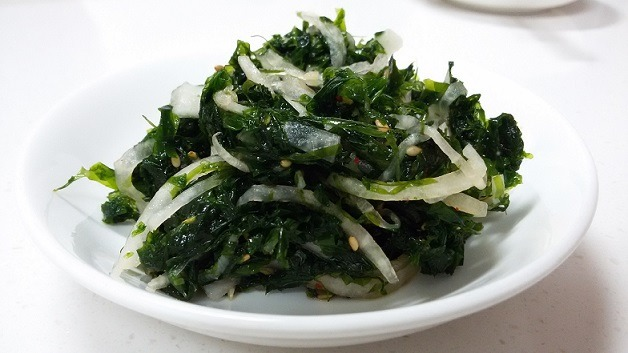
Parae-namul

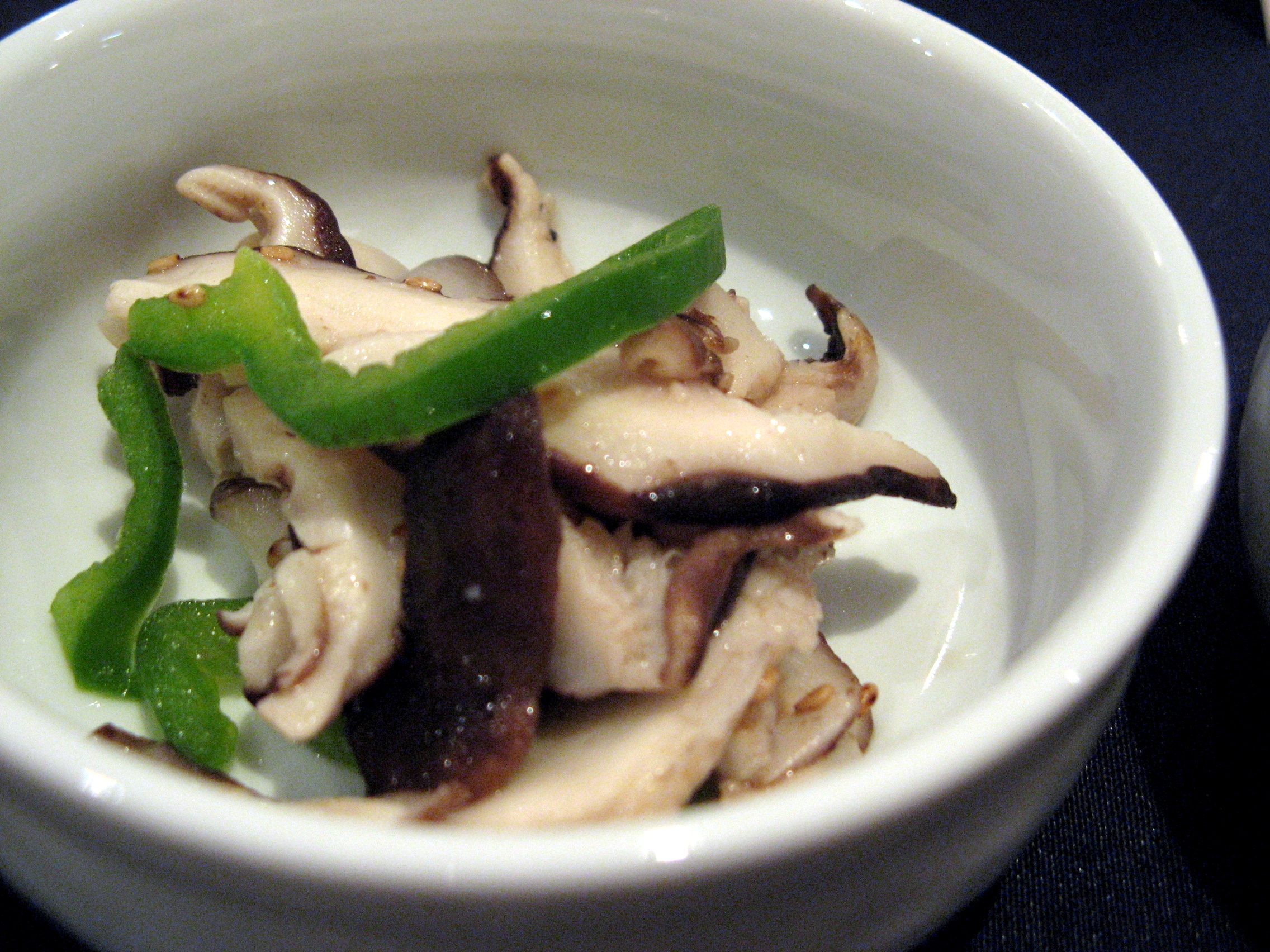
Pyogo-namul

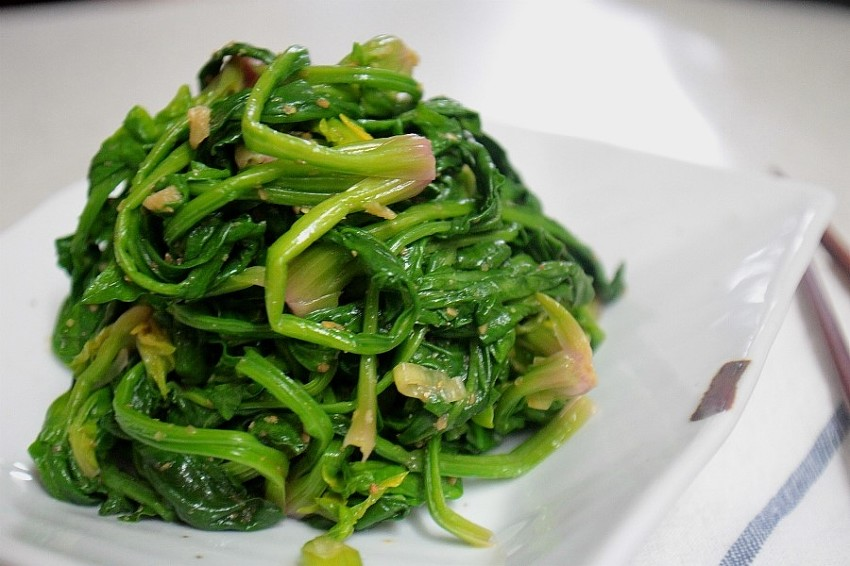
Sigeumchi-namul

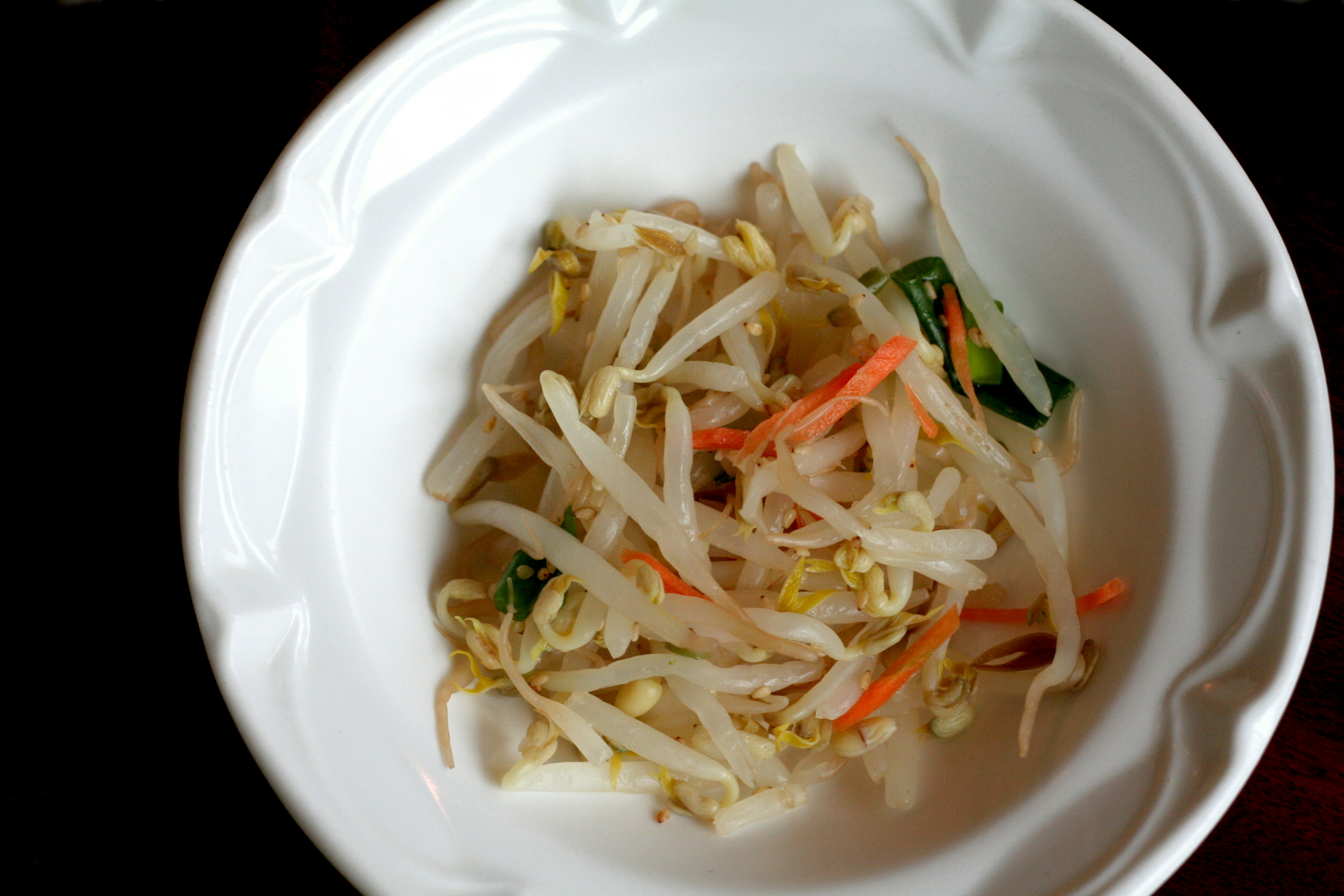
Sukjunamul

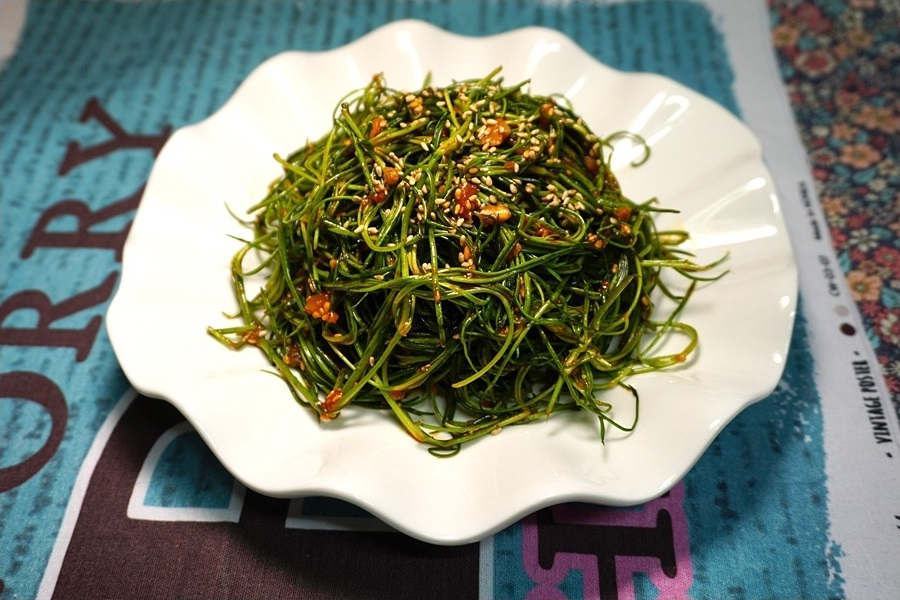
Sebalnamul

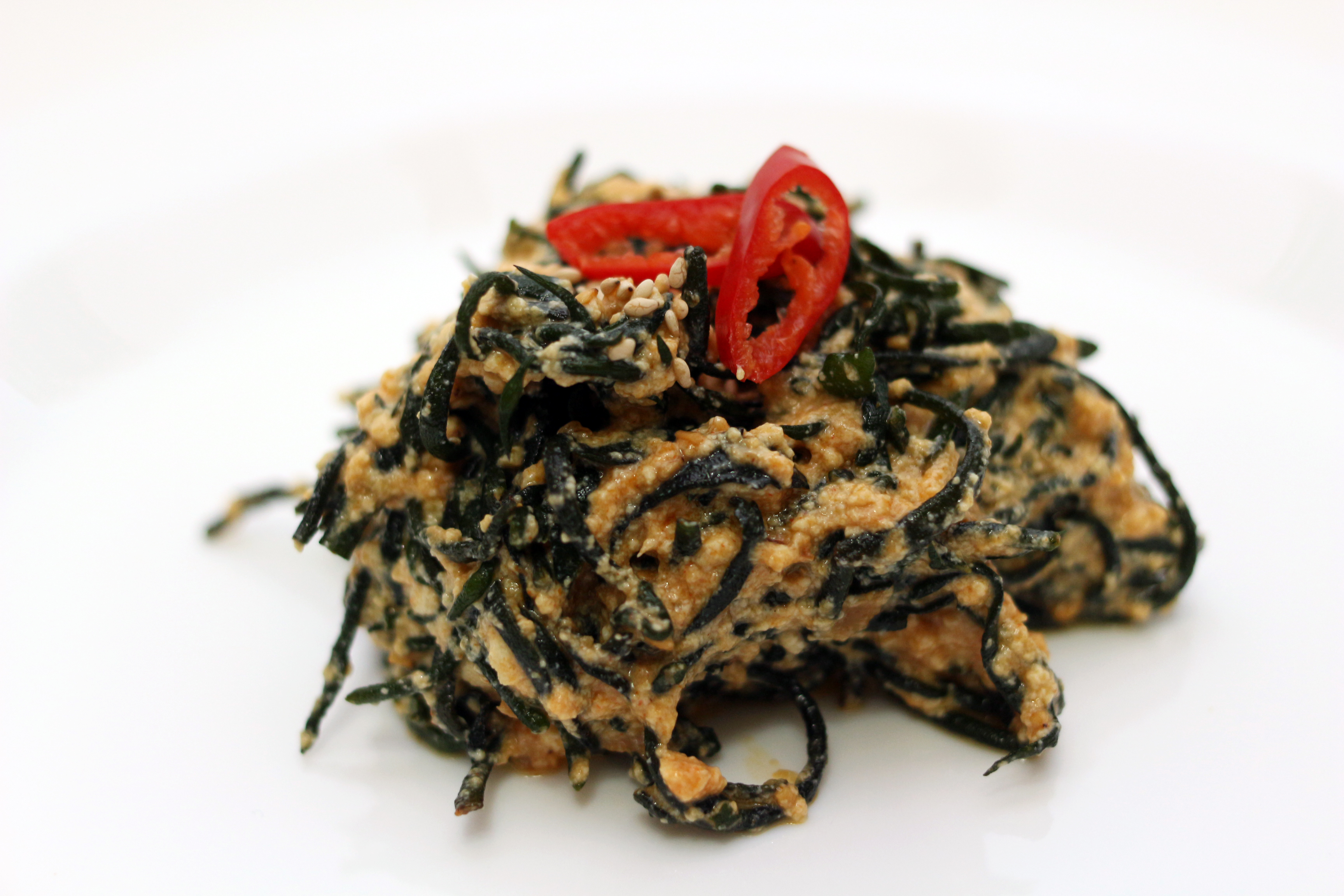
Tot-namul

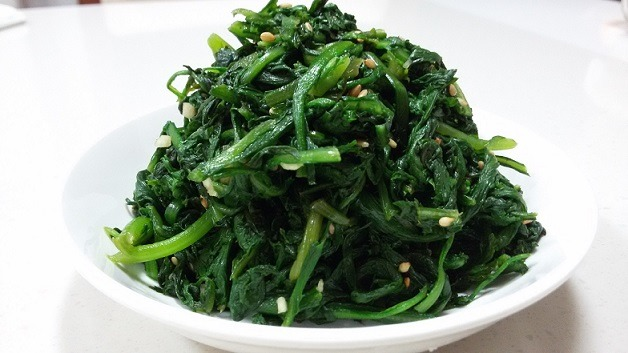
Ssukgat-namul

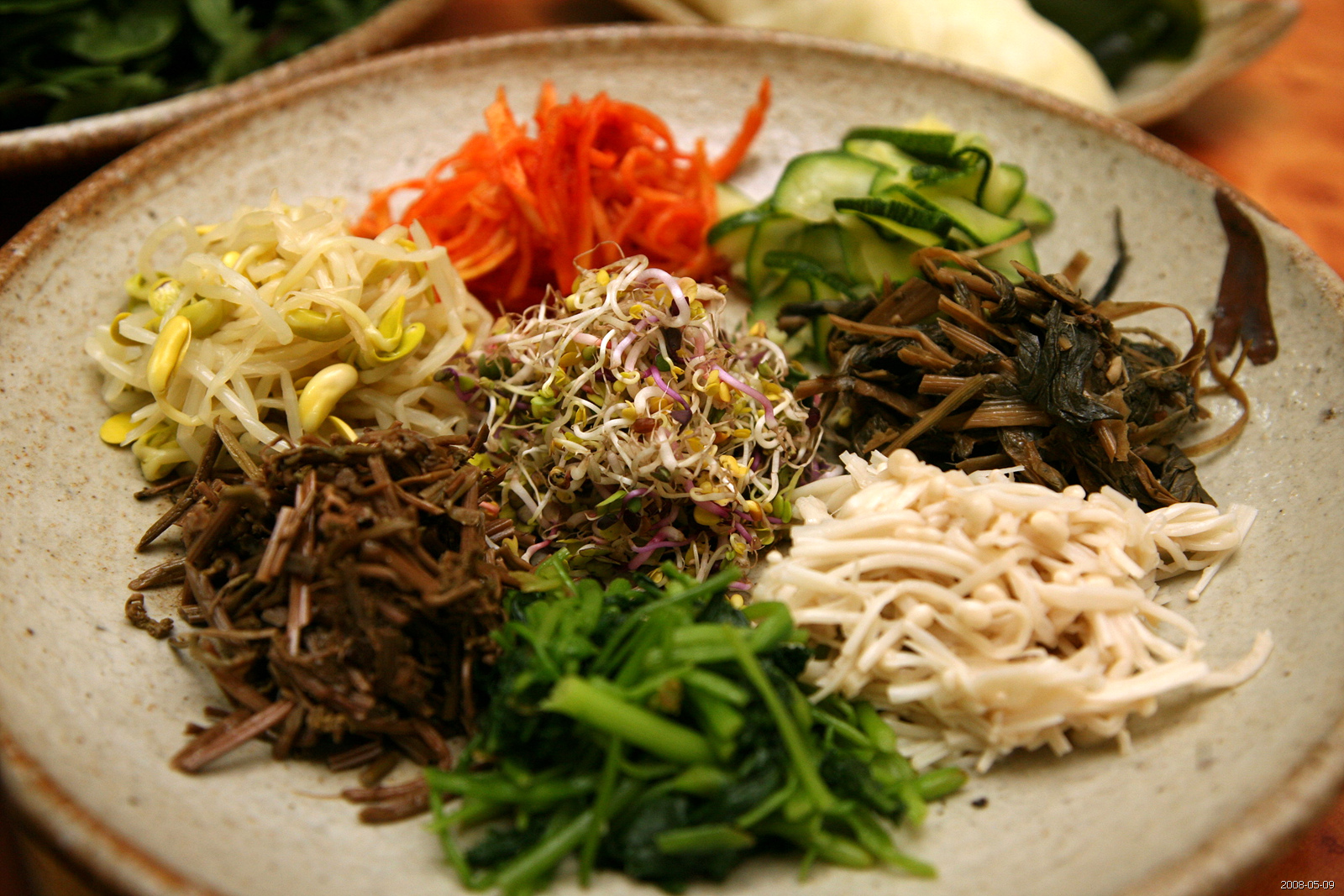
Various namuls for bibimbap

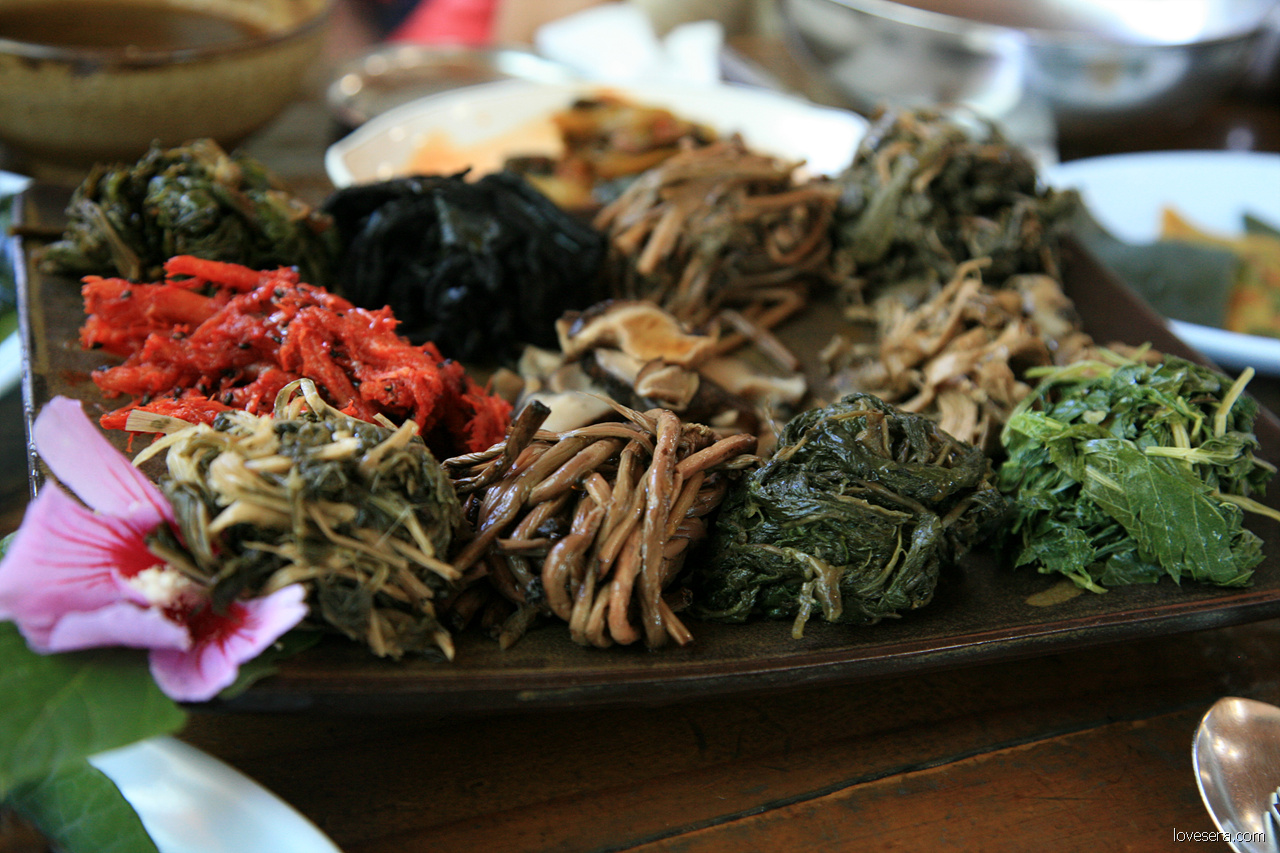
Sanchae table d'hôte

== See also ==
- Sansai
- Saag
- Ohitashi
