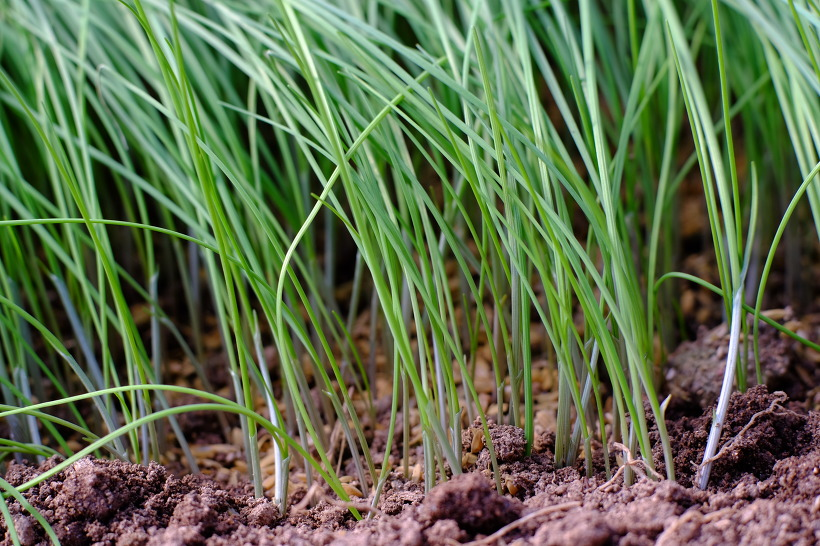
- Korean wild chive in Seosan, Korea

Scientific classification
- Kingdom: Plantae
- Clade: Tracheophytes
- Clade: Angiosperms
- Clade: Monocots
- Order: Asparagales
- Family: Amaryllidaceae
- Subfamily: Allioideae
- Genus: Allium
- Subgenus: A. subg. Microscordum
- Species: A. monanthum

Binomial name
- Allium monanthum Maxim.

Synonyms
- Allium biflorum Nakai; Allium monanthum var. floribundum Z.J. Zhong & X.T. Huang

= Allium monanthum =

Korean wild chive

Species of flowering plant

Allium monanthum, the Korean wild chive, is a spring vegetable with minuscule bulbous roots that have a mild onion flavor and found in the woodlands of Korea, Japan, northeastern Russia (Primorye), and northeastern China (Hebei, Heilongjiang, Jilin, Liaoning).

== Description ==
Allium monanthum is unusual in the genus in being usually dioecious (male and female flowers on separate plants), but rarely hermaphrodite or gynomonoecious. The species produces a single round bulb about 1 cm (1/3 in) in diameter. Scapes are relatively short for the genus, rarely more than 10 cm (4 in) tall. Leaves are flat, long and narrow, longer than the scape. Umbels are small, with one flower on pistillate (female) plants and 4-5 flowers on staminate (male) plants. All flowers are white, pink or red.

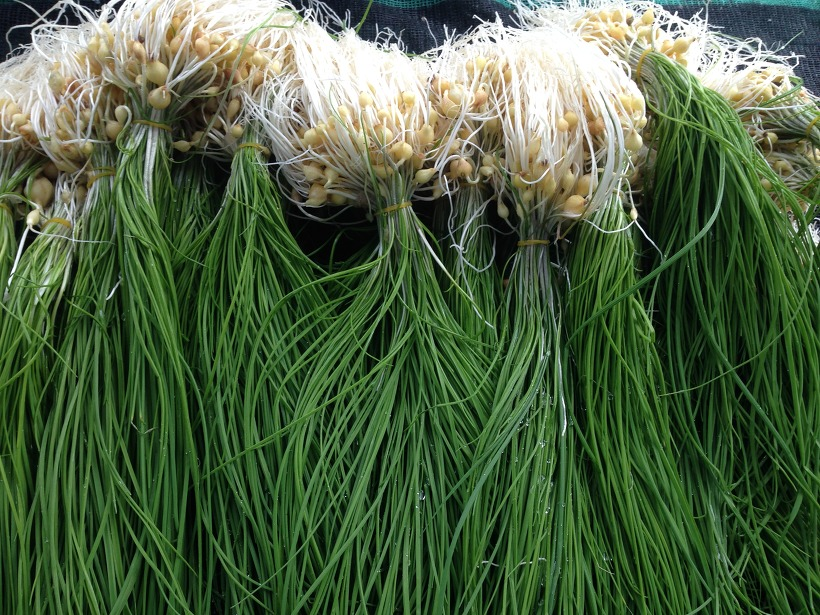
Roots, bulbs, stalks, and leaves

== Culinary uses ==
=== Korea ===
Called dallae (달래) in Korean, Korean wild chives are used in Korean herbal cooking alongside other san-namul (mountain vegetables) such as deodeok, angelica-tree, gondre and Siberian onion. Having a similar flavor profile to Tree onion, Korean wild chives can be eaten raw or blanched as a namul (seasoned herbal vegetable dish), pickled as a jangajji, or pan-fried to make buchimgae (pancake). As a herb, Korean wild chives make a good last minute addition to doenjang-jjigae (soybean paste stew) and other jjigae (stews). Soy sauce based dips are often flavored with Korean wild chives. In North Korea, radish water kimchi flavored with Korean wild chives is a popular spring banchan (side dish).

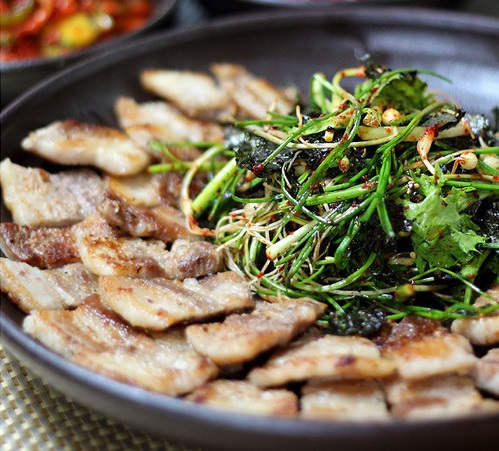
Dallae-muchim (seasoned wild chives) on samgyeopsal (grilled pork belly)

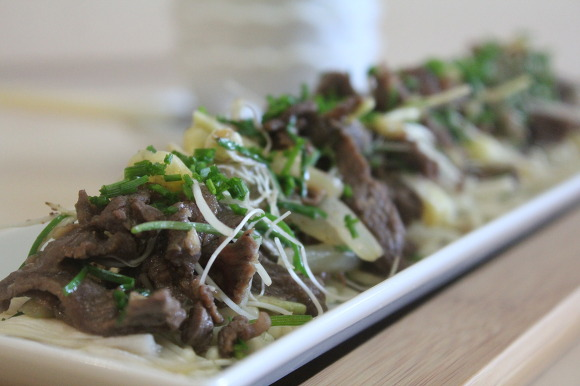
Dallae-bulgogi (bulgogi with wild chives)

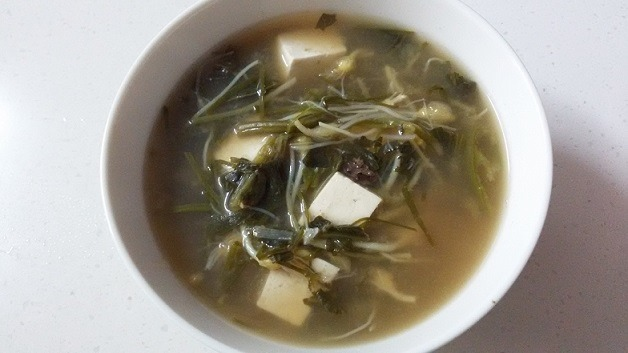
Dallae-doenjang-guk (soybean paste soup with wild chives)

== See also ==
- Field garlic
