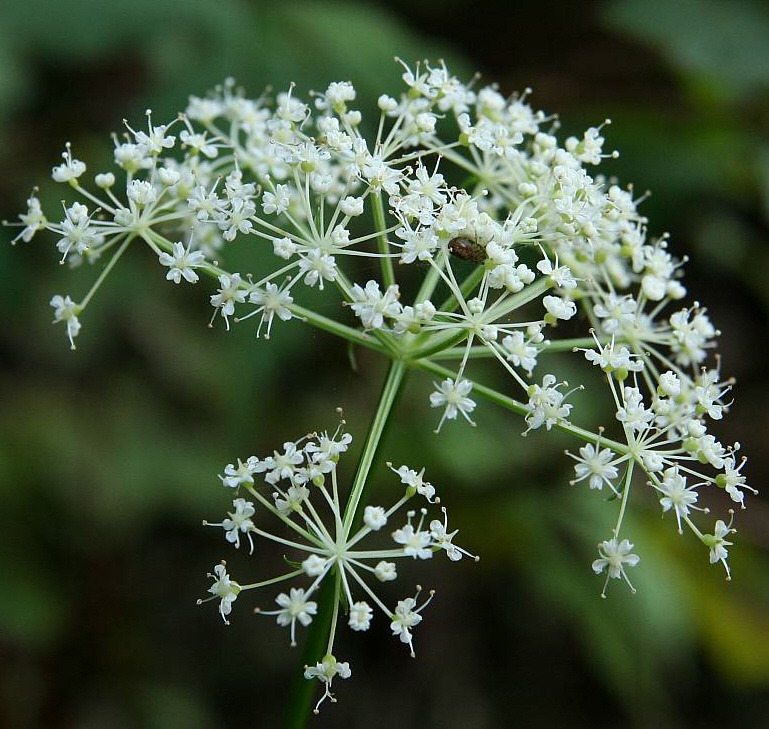
- chamnamul flower

Scientific classification
- Kingdom: Plantae
- Clade: Tracheophytes
- Clade: Angiosperms
- Clade: Eudicots
- Clade: Asterids
- Order: Apiales
- Family: Apiaceae
- Genus: Spuriopimpinella
- Species: S. brachycarpa

Binomial name
- Spuriopimpinella brachycarpa (Nakai) Kitag.

= Spuriopimpinella brachycarpa =

Species of flowering plant

Spuriopimpinella brachycarpa (Nakai) Kitag. (known formerly as Pimpinella brachycarpa) (common names chamnamul and short-fruit pimpinella) is a species in the genus Spuriopimpinella (family Apiaceae). It is a scented plant with saw-toothed, oval leaves, which bears white flowers between June and August, and edible baby leaves.

== Culinary use ==
Like many other species belonging to the family Apiaceae, chamnamul has aromatic leaves and is used as a culinary herb.

=== Korea ===
In Korean cuisine, the smooth leaves and crunchy stems of young chamnamul (참나물) are served fresh or balanced as a spring namul (seasoned herbal vegetable dish). In North Korea, chamnamul-kimchi is a popular dish, known as one of Kim Il Sung's favourites. Recently in South Korea, chamnamul is one of the ingredients that frequently feature in Korean-style western food recipes, such as chamnamul pasta or chamnamul pesto.

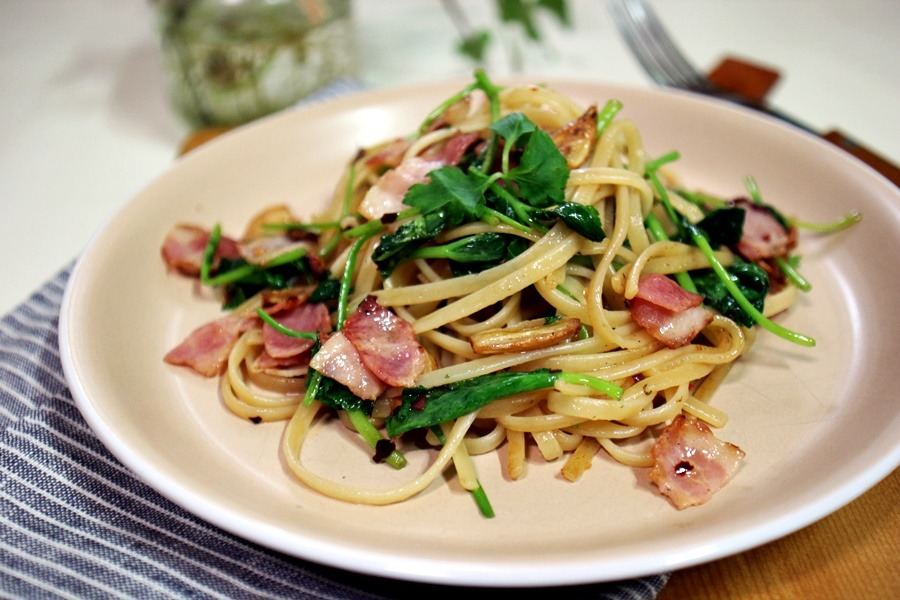
Chamnamul pasta

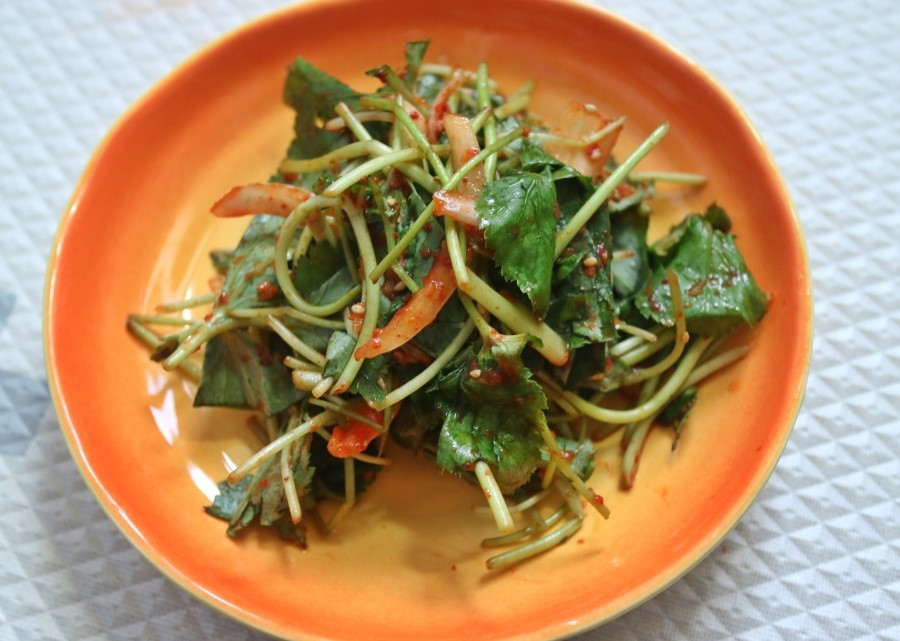
Chamnamul-muchim made of fresh chamnamul

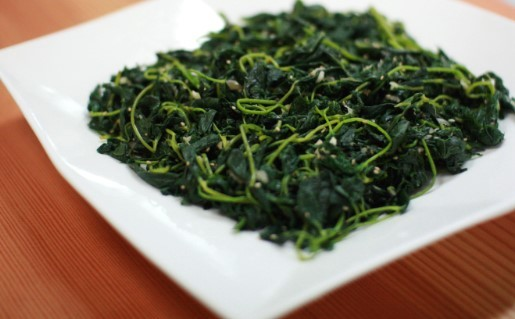
Chamnamul-muchim made of blanched chamnamul

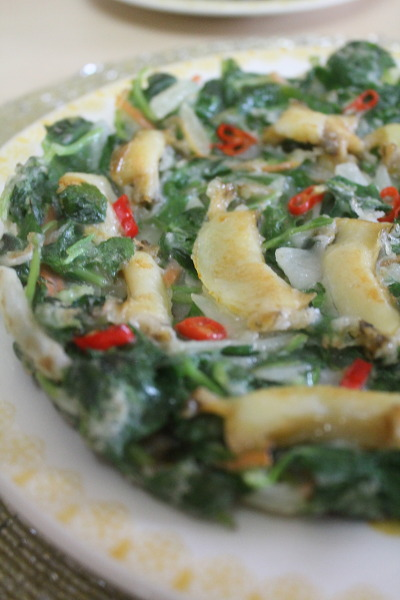
Jeonbok-chamnamul-buchimgae (abalone and chamnamul pancake)
