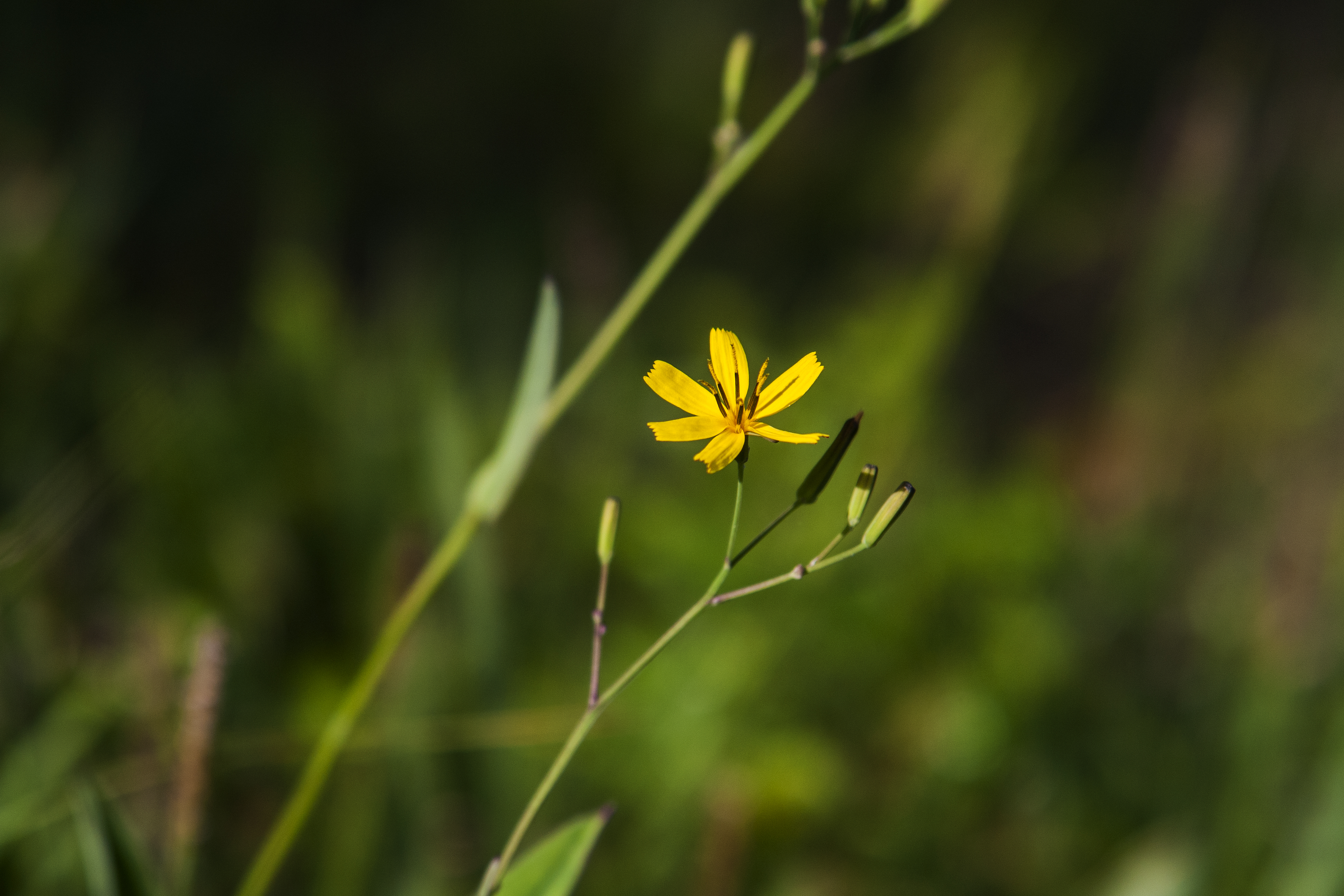
- Ixeridium dentatum

Scientific classification
- Kingdom: Plantae
- Clade: Tracheophytes
- Clade: Angiosperms
- Clade: Eudicots
- Clade: Asterids
- Order: Asterales
- Family: Asteraceae
- Subfamily: Cichorioideae
- Tribe: Cichorieae
- Subtribe: Crepidinae
- Genus: Ixeridium (A.Gray) Tzvelev

Type species
- Ixeridium dentatum (Thunb.) Tzvelev

Synonyms
- Ixeris sect. Ixeridium A.Gray; Ixeridium series Dentata Tzvelev; Ixeris sect. Ixeridium (A.Gray) A.Gray ex Kitam.

= Ixeridium =

Genus of flowering plants

Ixeridium is a genus of Asian flowering plants in the family Asteraceae.

Species

- Ixeridium aculeolatum C.Shih - Tibet
- Ixeridium alpicola (Takeda) Pak & Kawano - Japan
- Ixeridium beauverdianum (H.Lév.) Spring. - Bhutan, Japan, Nepal, Thailand, Vietnam, China
- Ixeridium biparum C.Shih - southern China
- Ixeridium dentatum (Thunb. ex Thunb.) Tzvelev - Kuril Islands, China, Japan, Korea, Philippines,
- Ixeridium gracile (DC.) Pak & Kawano - Nepal, Bhutan, Sikkim, Assam, Tibet, Yunnan
- Ixeridium kurilense Barkalov - Kuril Islands
- Ixeridium laevigatum (Blume) Pak & Kawano - China, Japan, Korea, Assam, Philippines, Indochina, Malaysia, Indonesia, New Guinea
- Ixeridium parvum (Kitam.) Pak & Kawano - Kyushu
- Ixeridium sagittarioides (C.B.Clarke) Pak & Kawano - Yunnan, Bhutan, India, Myanmar, Nepal, Thailand
- Ixeridium sandsii D.J.N.Hind & R.J.Johns - New Guinea
- Ixeridium siamense (Kerr) Pak & Kawano - Thailand
- Ixeridium subacaule (J.Kost.) Pak & Kawano - New Guinea
- Ixeridium transnokoense (Sasaki) Pak & Kawano - Taiwan
- Ixeridium yakuinsulare (Yahara) Pak & Kawano - Kyushu
- Ixeridium yunnanense C.Shih - Yunnan
