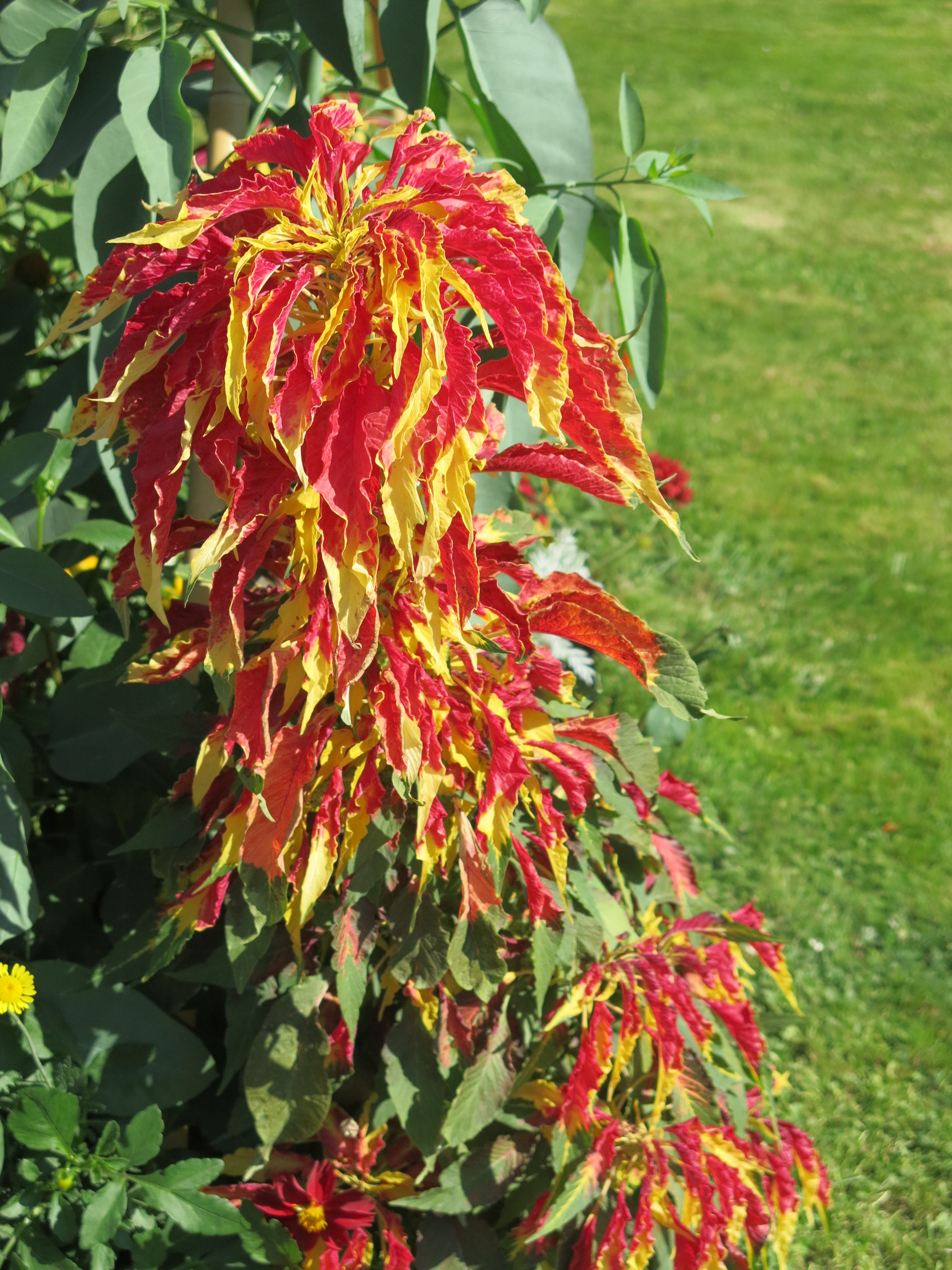

Scientific classification
- Kingdom: Plantae
- Clade: Tracheophytes
- Clade: Angiosperms
- Clade: Eudicots
- Order: Caryophyllales
- Family: Amaranthaceae
- Genus: Amaranthus
- Species: A. tricolor

Binomial name
- Amaranthus tricolor L.

Synonyms
- List: Amaranthus amboinicus Buch.-Ham. ex Wall.; Amaranthus bicolor Nocca ex Willd.; Amaranthus cuspidatus Vis.; Amaranthus dubius Mart. nom. inval.; Amaranthus flexuosus Moq.; Amaranthus gangeticus L.; Amaranthus inamoenus Willd.; Amaranthus incomptus Willd.; Amaranthus japonicus Houtt. ex Willd.; Amaranthus japonicus Houtt. ex Steud.; Amaranthus lanceolatus Roxb.; Amaranthus lancifolius Roxb.; Amaranthus lividus Roxb. nom. illeg.; Amaranthus mangostanus Blanco; Amaranthus melancholicus L.; Amaranthus oleraceus Roxb.; Amaranthus polygamus Roxb.; Amaranthus rotundifolius Moq.; Amaranthus salicifolius H.J.Veitch; Amaranthus tristis L.; Blitum gangeticum Moench; Blitum melancholicum Moench; Glomeraria bicolor Cav. ex Moq.; Glomeraria tricolor (L.) Cav.

= Amaranthus tricolor =

Species of flowering plant

Amaranthus tricolor, known as edible amaranth, is a species of flowering plant in the genus Amaranthus, part of the family Amaranthaceae.

The plant is often cultivated for ornamental and culinary purposes. It is known as bireum in Korea; tampala, tandaljo, or tandalja bhaji in India; callaloo in the Caribbean; and Joseph's coat in other areas, in reference to the Biblical story of Joseph and the coat of many colors. Although it is native to South and South-East Asia, A. tricolor is one of several species of amaranth cultivated in warm regions across the world. Cultivars have striking yellow, red, and green foliage.

== Culinary uses ==
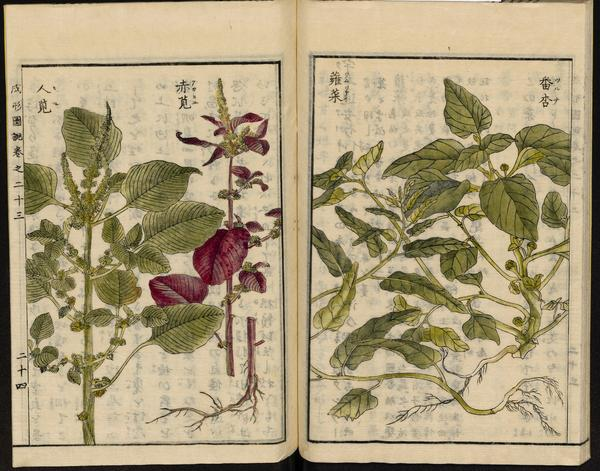
Amaranthus tricolor, illustration from the Japanese agricultural encyclopedia Seikei Zusetsu (1804)

The leaves and stems may be eaten as a salad vegetable. In Africa, it is usually cooked as a leafy vegetable. It is usually stir fried or steamed as a side dish in both China and Japan.

=== China ===
In China, it is referred to as xiàncài (simplified Chinese: 苋菜; traditional Chinese: 莧菜) and is often stir-fried with garlic and salt.

=== Korea ===
In Korea, the plant is referred to as bireum (비름). Small-leaved, reddish-stalked chambireum (참비름, "true bireum") is used as a namul vegetable in Korean cuisine. Considered a san-namul (wild green) that grows abundantly in the countryside, it tends to be foraged rather than planted and harvested. It has an earthy and nutty flavor, and goes well with both gochujang- and soup soy sauce-based seasonings, and bori-bap (barley rice).

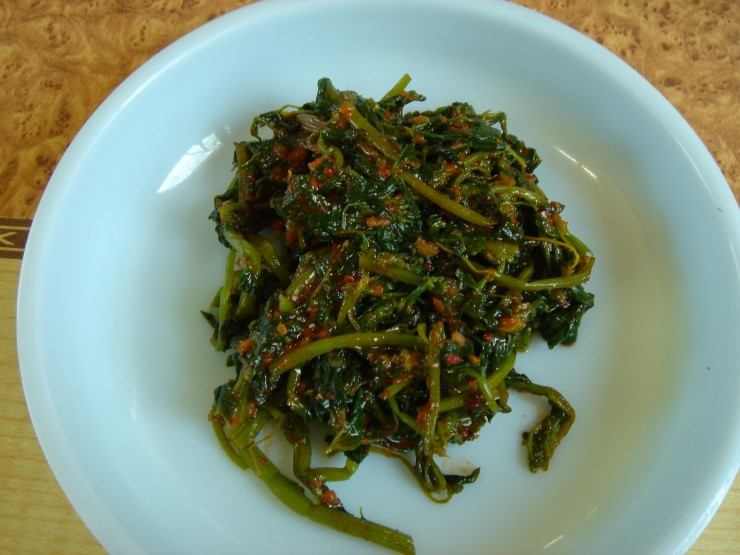
Bireum-namul (seasoned edible amaranth)

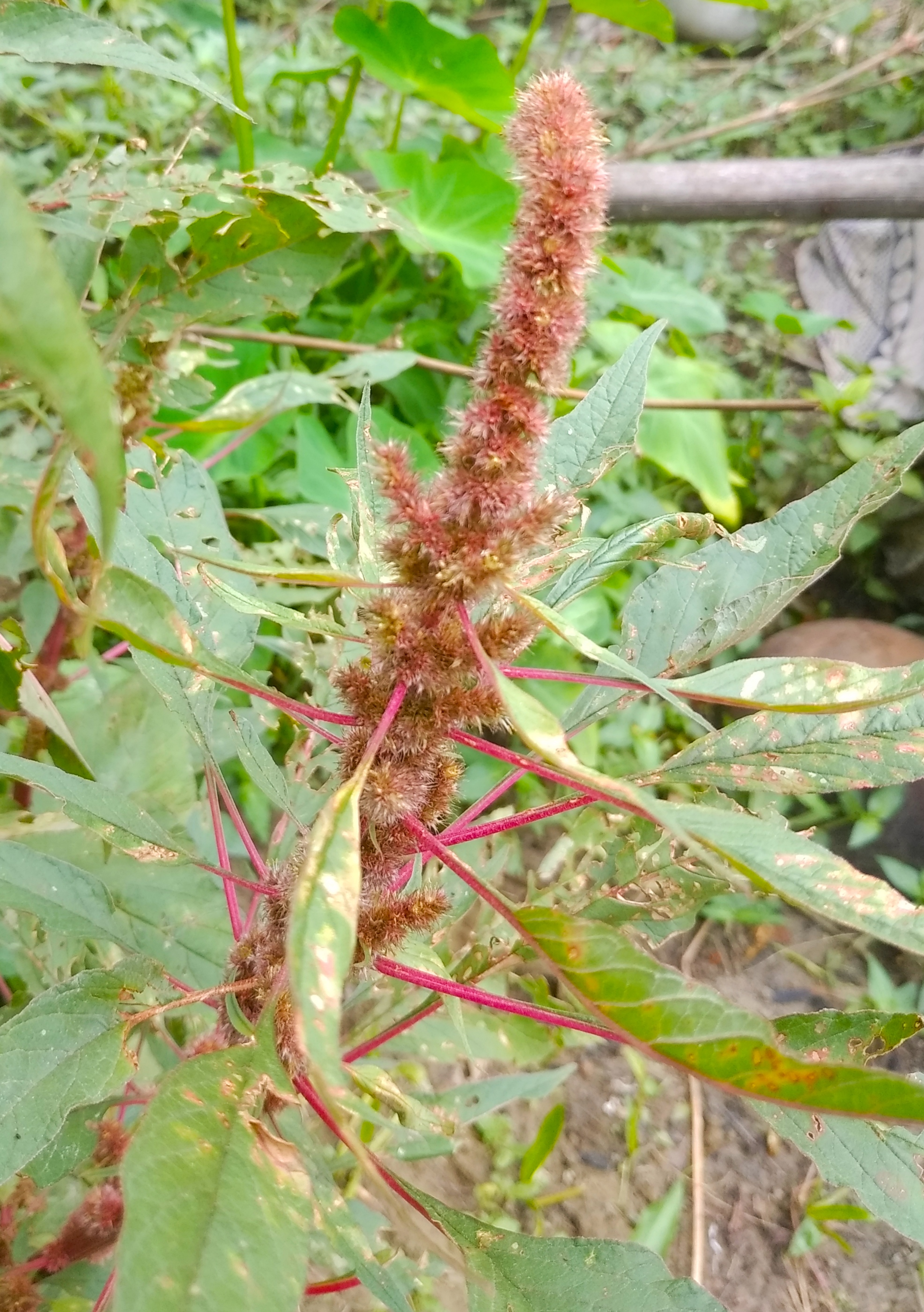
Amaranth (edible) flower

== In culture ==
It appears on the coat of arms of Gonville and Caius College, Cambridge, where it is called "flowers gentle".

== Amaranthus gangeticus ==
Amaranthus gangeticus is considered a synonym of A. tricolor, but has been recognized as a separate species in the past. A. gangeticus is also known as elephant-head amaranth. It is an annual flowering plant with deep purple flowers. It can grow to 2–3 feet (0.61–0.91 m) tall. In Bengal, it has been used as a leafy vegetable whose green variant is called Notey Shaak (নটে শাক) and whose red variant is called Laal Shaak (লাল শাক). It may inhibit calcium retention in rice-based diets.
