= Sansai =

Foraged plants in Japanese cuisine

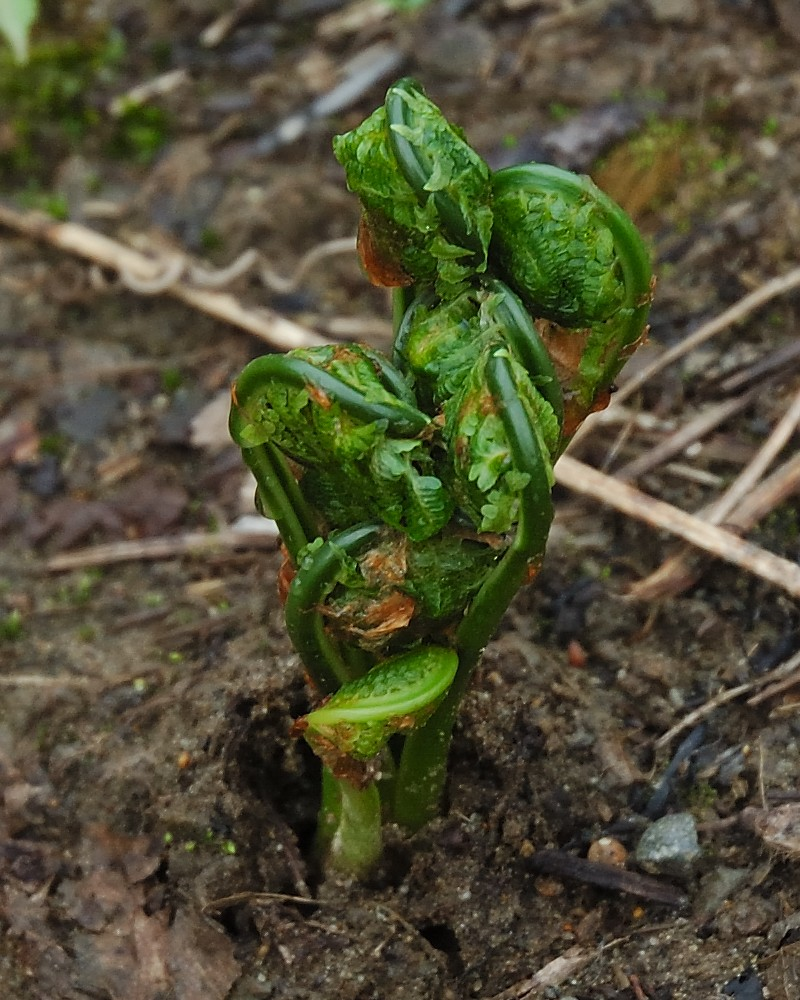
Kogomi (Matteuccia struthiopteris)

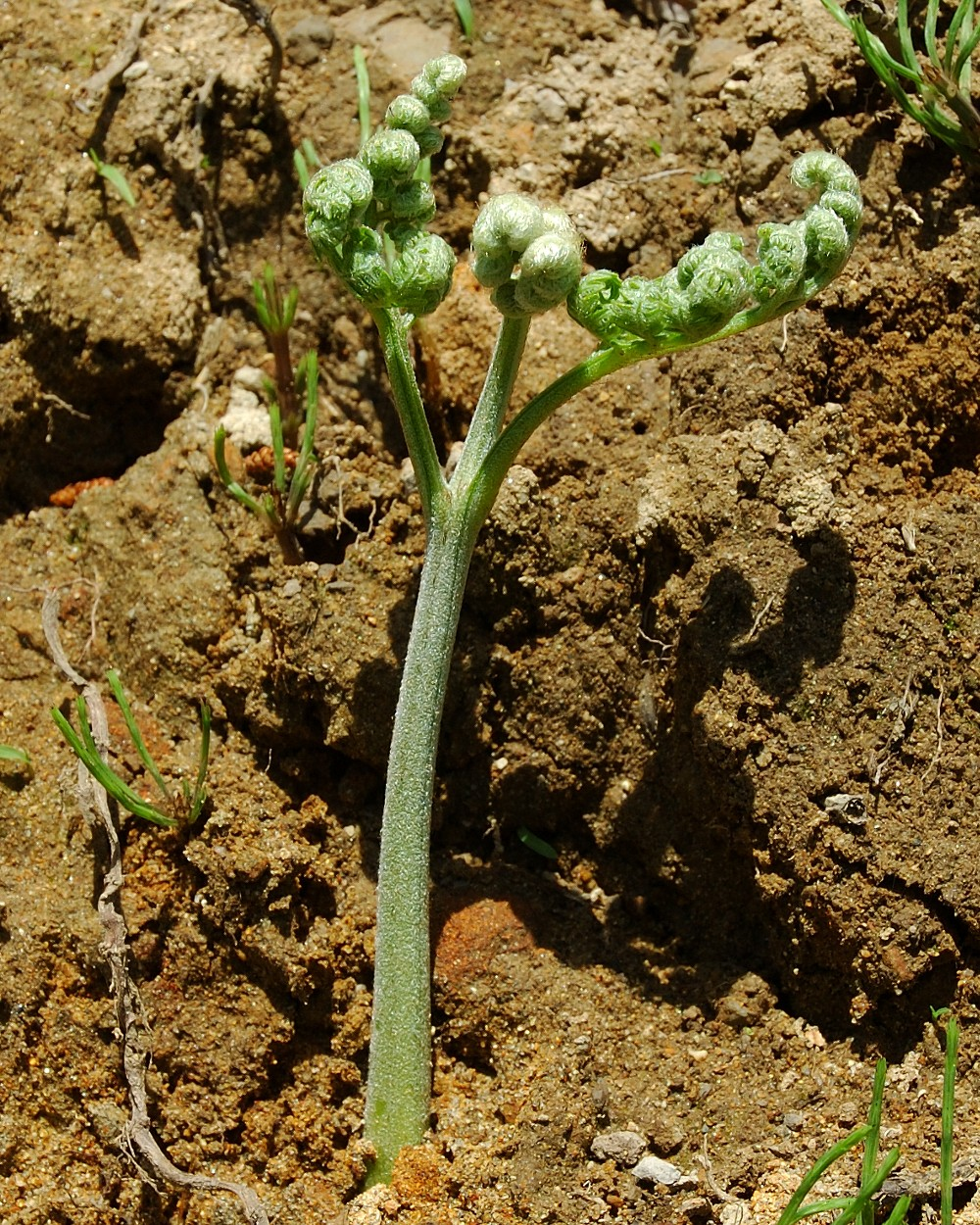
Warabi (Pteridium aquilinum)

Sansai (山菜) is a Japanese word literally meaning "mountain vegetables", originally referring to vegetables that grew naturally, were foraged in the wild, and not grown and harvested from fields. However, in modern times, the distinction is somewhat blurred, as some sansai, such as warabi (“fernbrake”), have been successfully cultivated. For example, some of the fern shoots, such as bracken (fiddlehead) and zenmai, shipped to market are farm-grown.

They are often sold pre-cooked in water, and typically packaged in plastic packs in liquid. The fern shoots warabi (bracken), fuki stalks in sticks, and mixes which may contain the above-mentioned combined with baby bamboo shoots, mushrooms, etc., are available in retail supermarkets, and ethnic foodstores in the US.

Sansai are often used as ingredients in Buddhist vegetarian cuisine known as shōjin ryōri.

== Examples ==
Sansai include:

- Chishimazasa (チシマザサ), Nemagaridake - bamboo shoots of Sasa kurilensis.
- Fuki-no-tō (Petasites japonicus) - flower shoots of butterbur (tō refers to a plant beginning to bolt)
- Gyojaninniku (Allium ochotense) - similar to ramps (A. tricoccum)
- Hana-ikada (ハナイカダ), Helwingia japonica, young leaves.
- Harigiri (Kalopanax)- Acer species, young leaves tarter than tara.
- Itadori (Reynoutria japonica, syn. Fallopia japonica - Japanese knotweed
- Kogomi - fernbrakes of kusasotetsu (Matteuccia struthiopteris)
- Koshiabura (コシアブラ), Chengiopanax sciadophylloides - young leaves.
- Mitsuba (ミツバ), Cryptotaenia canadensis subsp. japonica
- Momijigasa (モミジガサ), Parasenecio delphiniifolius, syn. Cacolia delphiniifolia) - an aster family plant, for young leaves and shoots
- Niyama-irakusa (ミヤマイラクサ), Laportea macrostachya - Nettlelike plants, which though young leaves and stems are eaten have stinging hairs requiring caution
- Nirinsō (ニリンソウ), Anemone flaccida - young leaves are eaten but may be mistaken for wolfsbane
- Nobiru (ノビル), Allium macrostemon - similar to field garlic
- Nogeshi - sowthistle (Sonchus oleraceus), for young leaves
- Seri - Japanese parsley (Oenanthe javanica)
- Sarunashi (Actinidia arguta) - fruits are eaten raw or to flavor alcohol
- Shiode (Smilax riparia var. ussuriensis) - young leaves
- Tara no me - young shoots of the Japanese angelica tree
- Tade (Persicaria hydropiper) - Water pepper, leaves and shoots used as an ingredient for sauces or as a garnish
- Tsuwabuki (Farfugium japonicum) - Stems prepared like fuki
- Udo - Japanese spikenard.
- Uwabamisō (Elatostema umbellatum var. majus)
- Warabi - bracken shoots
- Zenmai - another type of fern top, more prized than kogomi or warabi, and also sold dried.

== See also ==
- San-namul, Korean category similar to sansai
- Ohitashi
