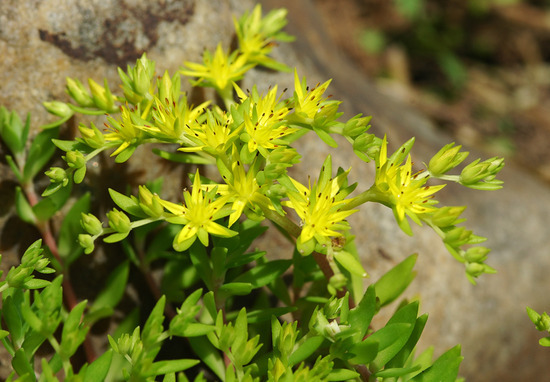

Scientific classification
- Kingdom: Plantae
- Clade: Embryophytes
- Clade: Tracheophytes
- Clade: Spermatophytes
- Clade: Angiosperms
- Clade: Eudicots
- Order: Saxifragales
- Family: Crassulaceae
- Genus: Sedum
- Species: S. sarmentosum

Binomial name
- Sedum sarmentosum Bunge

Synonyms
- Sedum angustifolium Z.B.Hu & X.L.Huang; Sedum kouyangense H. Lév. & Vaniot; Sedum sarmentosum f. majus Diels; Sedum sheareri S. Moore

= Sedum sarmentosum =

Species of succulent

Sedum sarmentosum, known as stringy stonecrop, gold moss stonecrop, and graveyard moss, is a perennial flowering plant in the family Crassulaceae native to East Asia (China and Korea) and Southeast Asia (Thailand). It has been introduced in at least eastern North America, and Europe.

== Description ==
Sedum sarmentosum has succulent, evergreen leaves atop arching, low-lying stems. Yellow flowers with five petals arise on inflorescences during the summer.

== Cultivation ==
Sedum sarmentosum is cultivated as a perennial groundcover in temperate climates. Like most succulents, it is tolerant of drought and full sun conditions. It was commonly planted at graves, where it may persist for decades. In China, it is often cultivated as a trailing plant, hence the name chuípéncǎo (垂盆草) which means "herb that trails down the flowerpot".

== Culinary use ==
In Korea, the plant is called dolnamul (돌나물) and is eaten fresh as a namul vegetable. The spicy, sweet, and tangy sauce typically served with dolnamul can be made by mixing gochujang, vinegar (or lemon juice), sugar (or plum syrup), minced garlic, sesame oil, and toasted sesame seeds. Dolnamul is also a common ingredient in bibimbap, as well as Korean-style western food such as dolnamul and roasted fruit salad with yuja dressing.

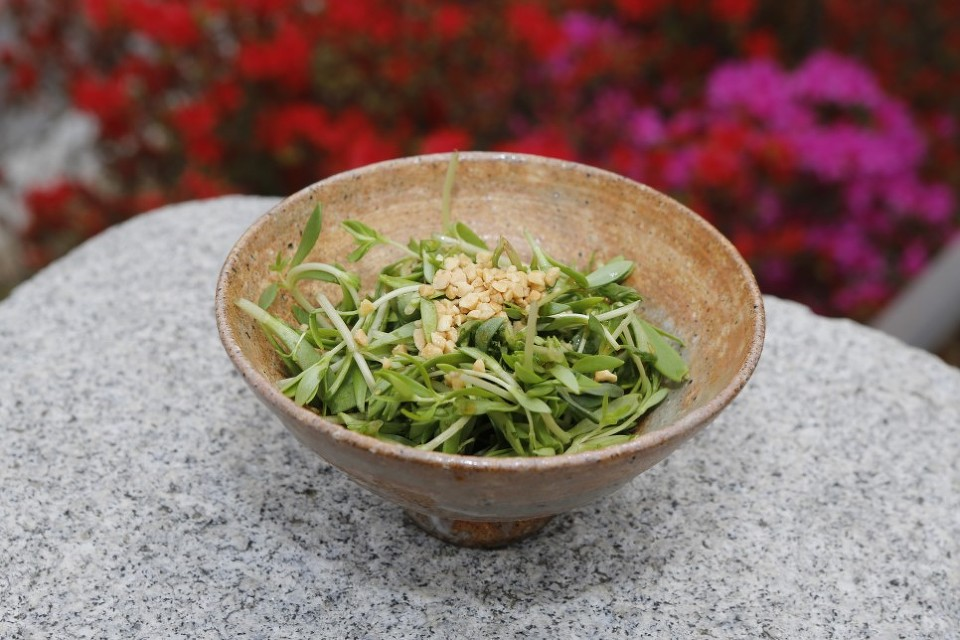
Dolnamul and peanut salad

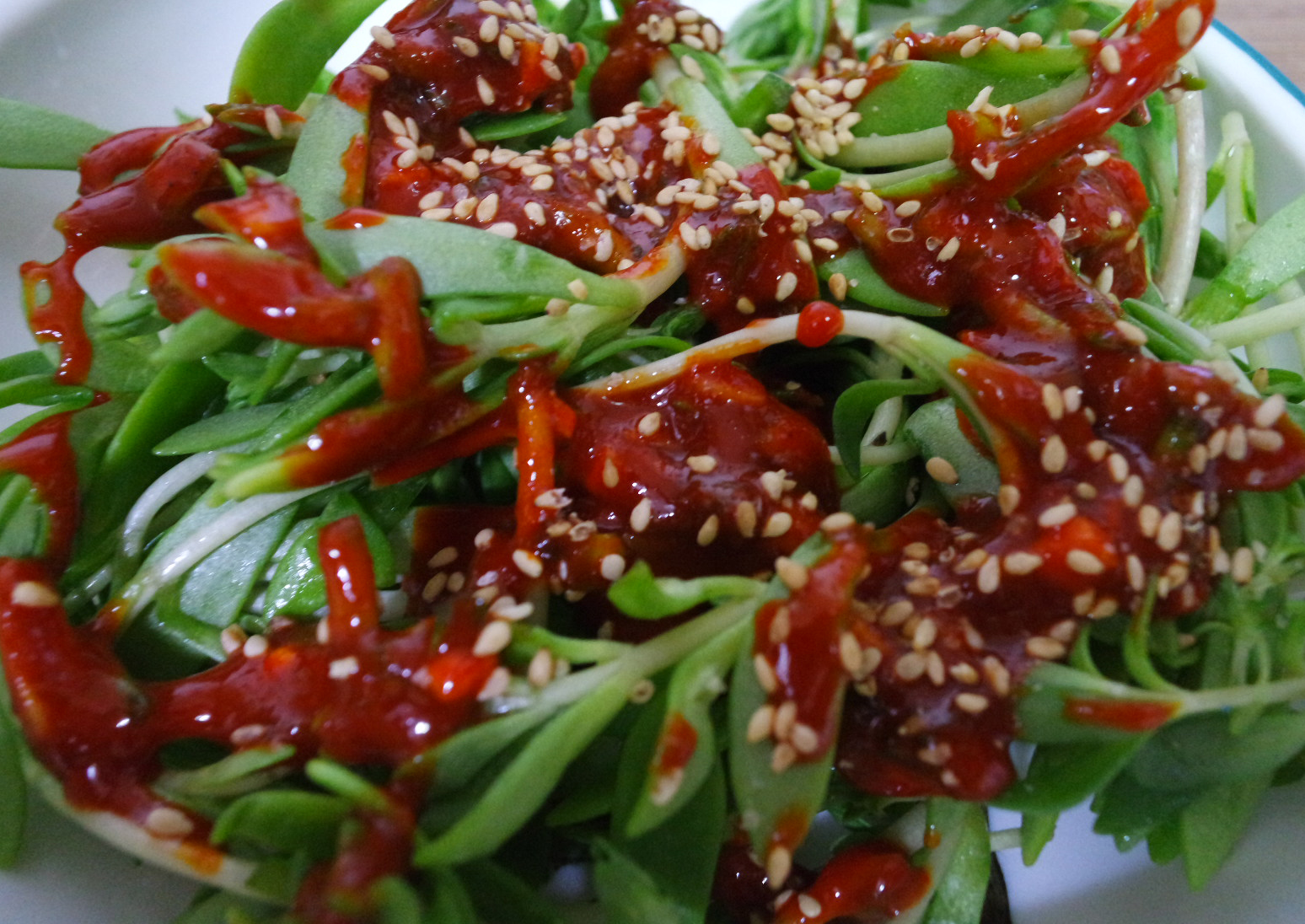
Dolnamul-muchim, seasoned with gochujang-based sweet and tangy sauce
