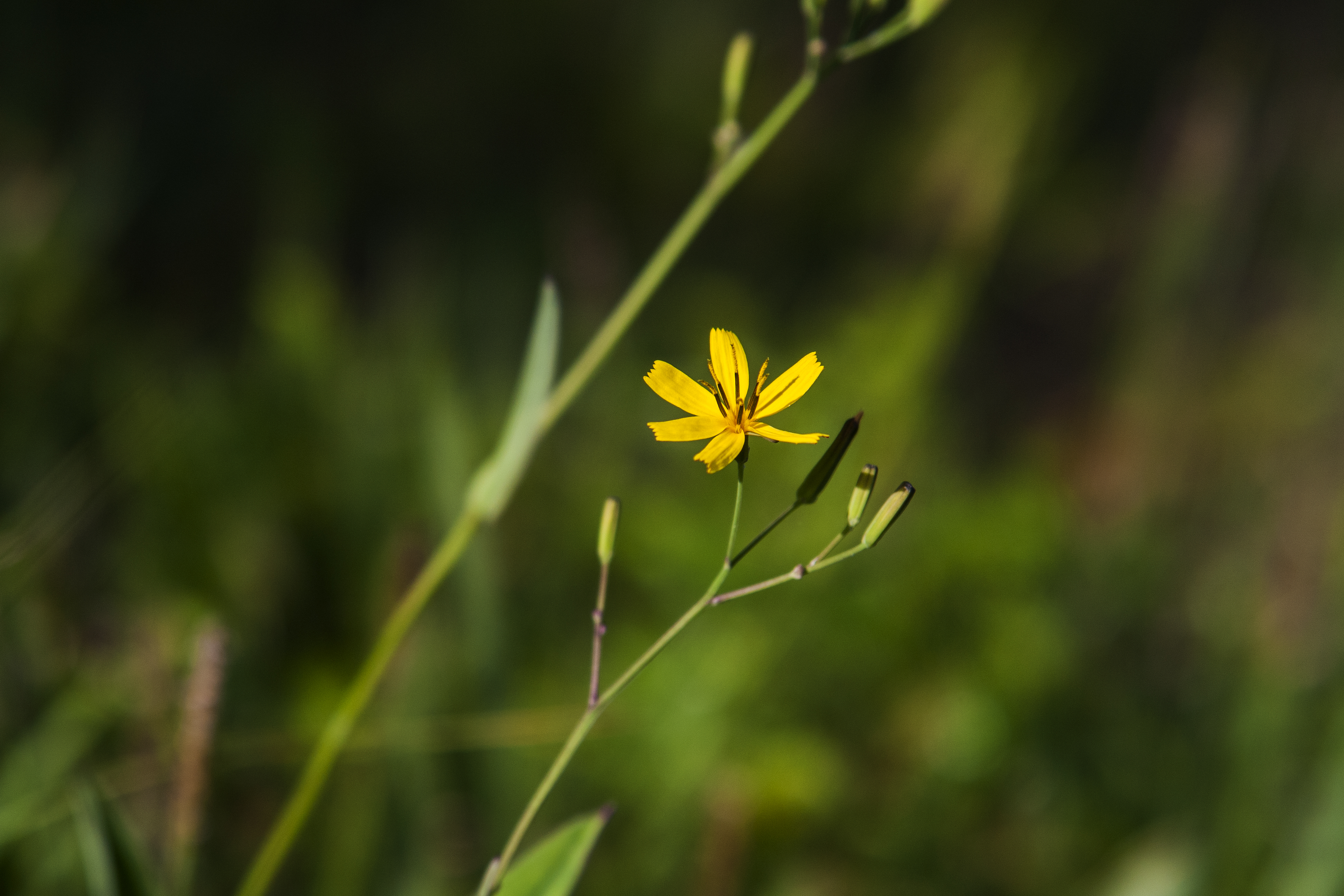

Scientific classification
- Kingdom: Plantae
- Clade: Tracheophytes
- Clade: Angiosperms
- Clade: Eudicots
- Clade: Asterids
- Order: Asterales
- Family: Asteraceae
- Genus: Ixeridium
- Species: I. dentatum

Binomial name
- Ixeridium dentatum (Thunb. ex Thunb.) Tzvelev

Synonyms
- Chondrilla dentata (Thunb.) Poir. Ixeris albiflora A.Gray; Ixeris dentata (Thunb. ex Thunb.) Nakai; Ixeris thunbergii A.Gray; Lactuca albiflora (A.Gray) Maxim. Lactuca crepidioides Vaniot; Lactuca dentata (Thunb.) Makino; Lactuca dentata (Thunb.) C.B.Rob. Lactuca thunbergii (A.Gray) Maxim. Paraixeris dentata (Thunb.) H.S.Pak; Prenanthes dentata Thunb. Prenanthes dentata Thunb. ex Murray; Youngia dentata (Thunb.) DC.

= Ixeridium dentatum =

Species of flowering plant

Ixeridium dentatum, the toothed ixeridium, is a species of flowering plant in the family Asteraceae, native to East Asia (China, Japan, Korea, and Russian Far east).

It is a perennial plant whose leaves and stems and produce a white juice with a bitter taste.

== Description ==
The species is commonly found on the sides of roads, and in the wilderness, throughout Japan, Korea, and parts of China. It grows to about 20-40 centimeters tall. It has yellow, usually five petaled flowers that bloom in the spring. Its rhizome is short, its stem is thin and upright, and the stem branches near the top. Its leaves are broad and lanceolate. It prefers partial shade. In Japan, it's known as “nigana” which literally translates to English as “bitter greens.” However, other plants of this genus are also known as “nigana” in Japanese, so it's not a specific term.

== Uses ==
Used as a folk remedy in Japan where it's said to relieve indigestion and reduce inflammation. The whole plant is used as a remedy including roots. The plant is harvested during its flowering period, and then washed and dried before consuming.
