= Cirsium setidens =

Scientific classification
- Kingdom: Plantae
- Clade: Tracheophytes
- Clade: Angiosperms
- Clade: Eudicots
- Clade: Asterids
- Order: Asterales
- Family: Asteraceae
- Genus: Cirsium
- Species: C. setidens

Binomial name
- Cirsium setidens (Dunn) Nakai

Species of thistle

Cirsium setidens, also known as gondeure and Korean thistle, is a perennial plant in the genus Cirsium in the family Asteraceae. It grows naturally in submontane and mountainous area in Korean peninsula where its young leaves are used as namul. In Korean, it is called goryeo-eongeongkwi (고려엉겅퀴, literally "Goryeo thistle") and gondeure (곤드레).

== Description ==
Cirsium setidens is a perennial plant up to 100–120 centimetres (39–47 in) tall. Radical leaves and lower cauline ones become withered when the flowers bloom. Mid cauline leaves are arranged alternately, ovate or wide lanceolate, green, and 15–35 centimetres (5.9–13.8 in) long, with tapering end, spiny or even margins, and leafstalks. The upper space of the leaves is hairy, while the underside is usually white-tinged without hair. Upper cauline leaves are smaller, lanceolate with pointy ends, shorter leafstalks, and spiny margin. The roots are erect.

Purple flowers bloom from July to October. The capitula are quite large – about 3–4 centimetres (1.2–1.6 in) in diameter. Each capitulum is on the tip of a branch or the main stem. The involucres are bell-shaped, 20 millimetres (0.79 in) long and 20–30 millimetres (0.79–1.18 in) wide, with spider-web-like hair. The involucels, with pointy ends and sticky underside, are arranged in seven rows. The corollas are purple, about 15–19 millimetres (0.59–0.75 in) long. The fruits are achenes, each 3.5–4 millimetres (0.14–0.16 in) long. The pappi are brown, about 11–16 millimetres (0.43–0.63 in) long.

== Culinary use ==
A well-known speciality of Jeongseon is gondeure-namul-bap, a type of namul made with dried gondeure, seasoned with perilla oil, and served over rice.

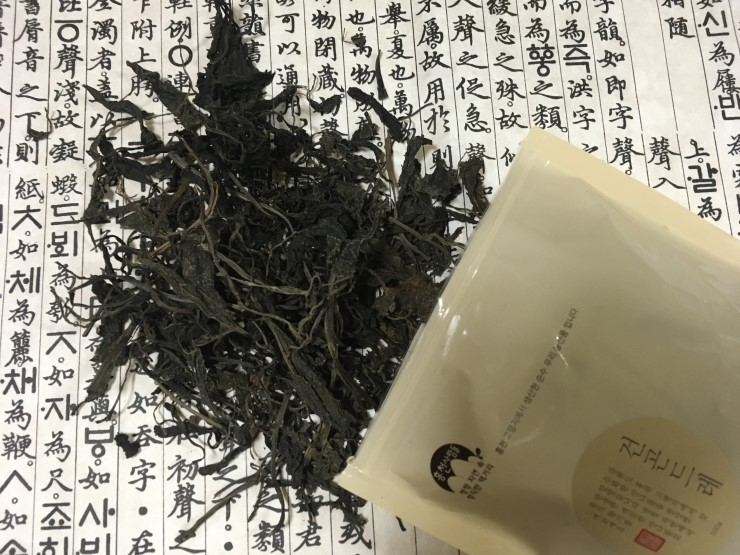
Dried gondeure as banchan (side dish)

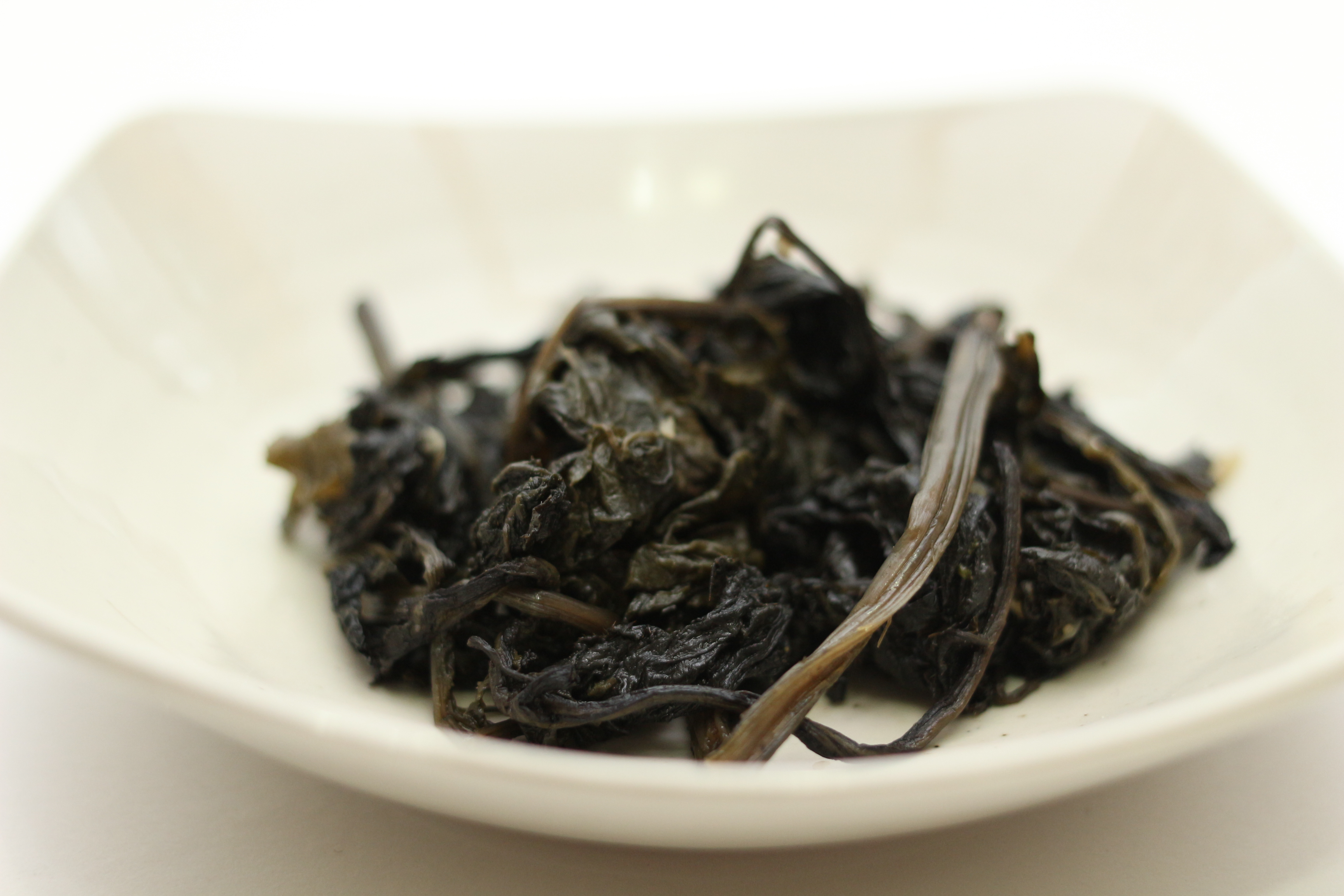
Gondeure-namul (seasoned gondeure side dish)

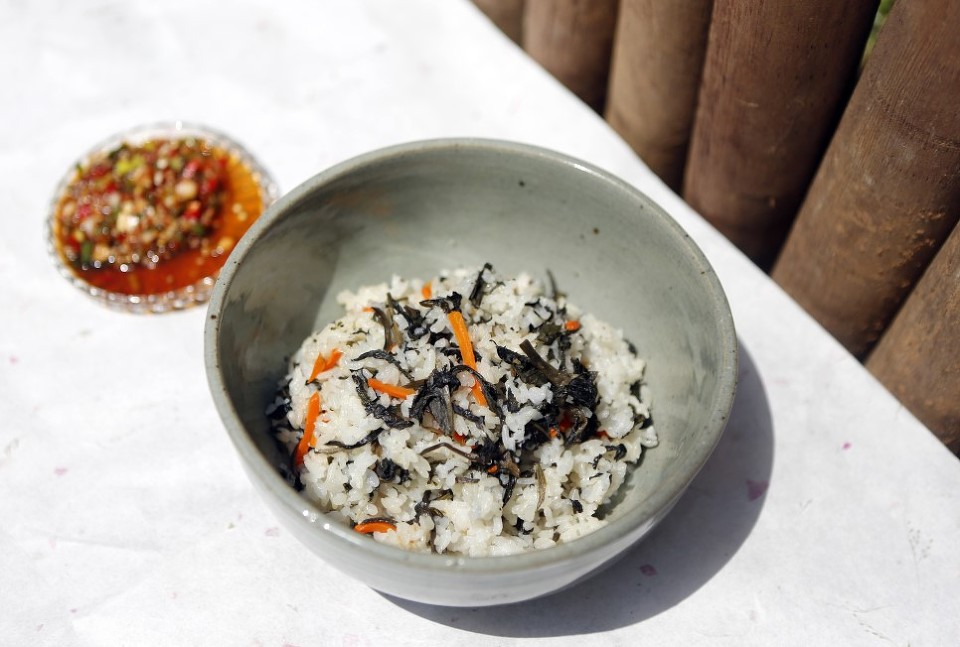
Gondeure-namul-bap
