= Field garlic =

Field garlic is a common name for several plants in the garlic genus, Allium:

- Allium oleraceum
- Allium vineale, native to Europe, northwestern Africa, and the Middle East
