= Ponytail (disambiguation) =

A ponytail is a hairstyle where hair is gathered and secured at the back of the head.

Ponytail or ponytails may also refer to:

- Ponytail (band), an American art rock band
- Ponytail, a 1960-1988 newspaper comic created by Lee Holley.
- The Poni-Tails, a 1950s female American group
- "Pony tail", a song by Wild Beasts from the 2016 album Boy King
- Ponytail radish, or Chonggak radish, a variety of white radish
- Ponytail palm, Beaucarnea recurvata, an evergreen perennial plant

== See also ==
- Pigtail
- Ponytail-gate, a minor controversy involving John Key
