= Chonggak radish =

Variety of radish

Alatrimu Altari radish
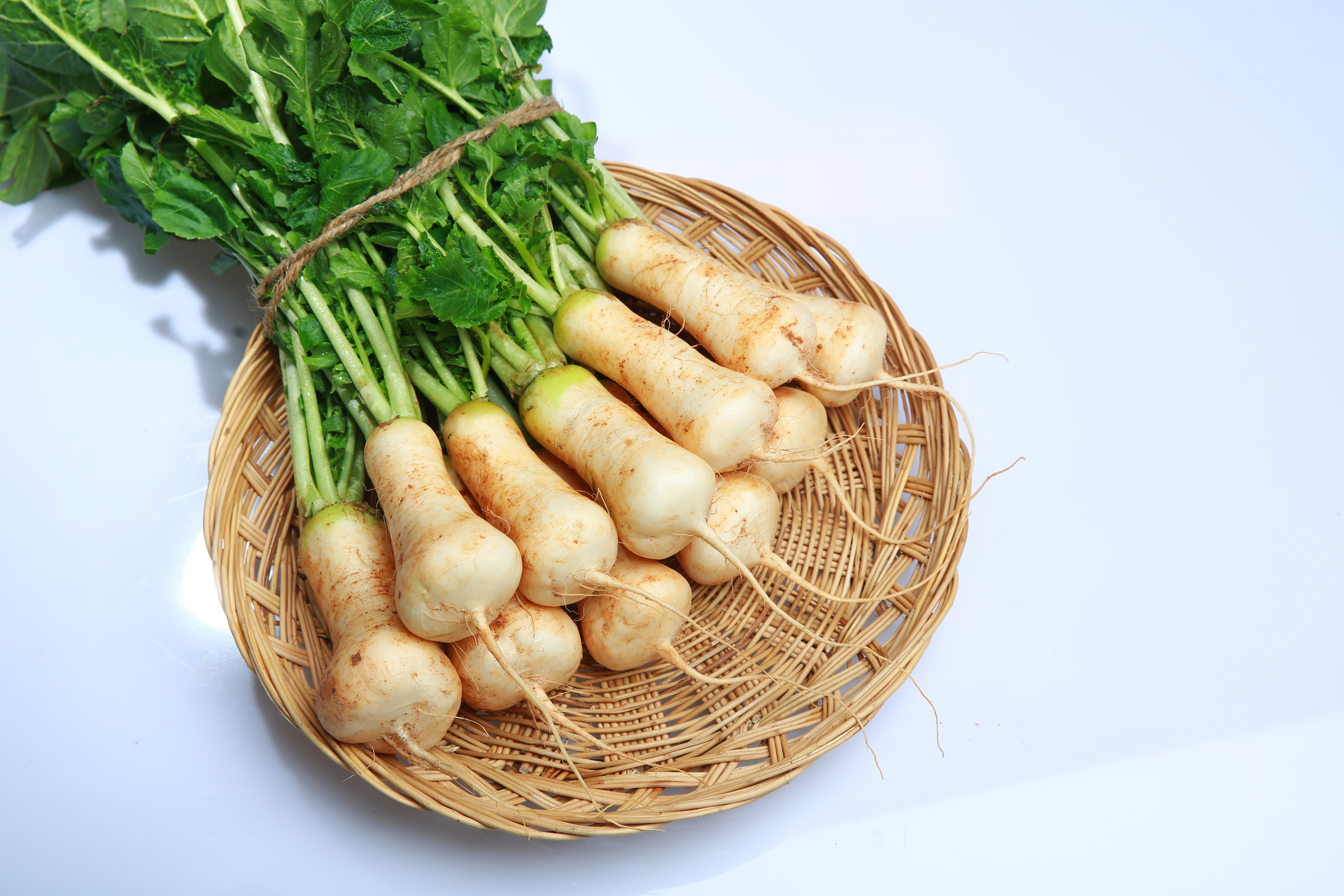
- Species: Raphanus raphanistrum
- Subspecies: R. raphanistrum subsp. sativus
- Cultivar group: White radish group
- Origin: Korea

Korean name
- Hangul: 총각무; 알타리무
- Hanja: 總角무; (none)
- RR: chonggangmu; altarimu
- MR: ch'onggangmu; alt'arimu
- IPA: tɕʰoŋ.ɡaŋ.mu; al.tʰa.ɾi.mu

Chonggakmu (chonggak radish) or Altarimu (altari radish), also called ponytail radish, is a variety of white radish. It is a small radish with many fine roots; of which the entire plant, including the leaves and stems, is used in Korean cuisine.

== Names and etymology ==
The Sino-Korean word chonggak+Korean word mu (총각무) is a compound of chonggak (총각, "bachelor") and mu (무, "radish"). In premodern Korea, unmarried men and boys pulled their hair into a long braid, while married adult men wore their hair in sangtu, a topknot. On the day of the coming of age ceremony, a boy's braid was undone and it was first made into chonggak, hornlike double topknots, before it was undone again and be made into sangtu. As the shape of chonggak radishes resembled the shape of chonggak hair, it came to be called by the name of chonggak radish.

Altarimu(Altari radish) is also a common name in Korea. One theory about the etymology of 알타리(altari) is that it comes from 알달리(aldalli)(meaning “round like an egg”) referring to the lower part of the radish, and later transformed into altari.

== Description ==
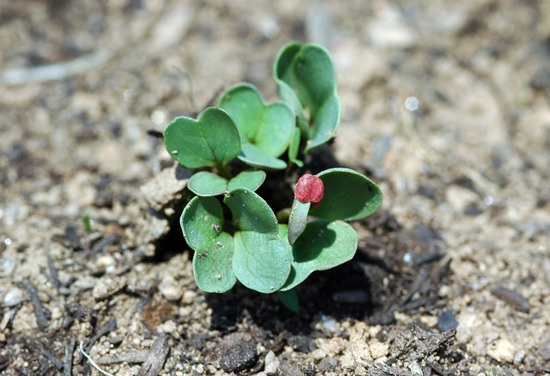
Chonggak radish sprouting

The taproots of the radish weigh 60–80 grams (2.1–2.8 oz), and are about ten to thirteen times smaller than a regular Korean radish. The upper part of the roots are subterranean stems, from which the long ovate leaves grow. The roots are 8–9 centimetres (3.1–3.5 in) long and the rhizomes are 2–3 centimetres (0.79–1.18 in) long.

== Culinary use ==
Radish greens, called mucheong, is dried to make siraegi or used fresh in cooking. Whole, vertically halved, or quartered chonggak radishes along with the leaves and stems are often used to make kimchi, called chonggak-kimchi, with the seasonings similar to those of kkakdugi (radish kimchi). Chonggak radishes can also be used to make dongchimi, a soupy winter radish kimchi.

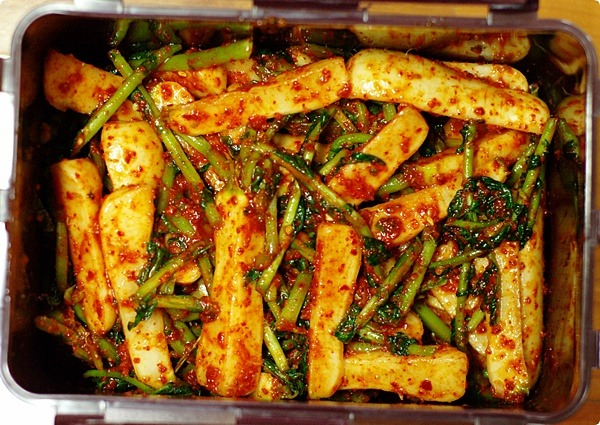
Chonggak-kimchi (chonggak radish kimchi)

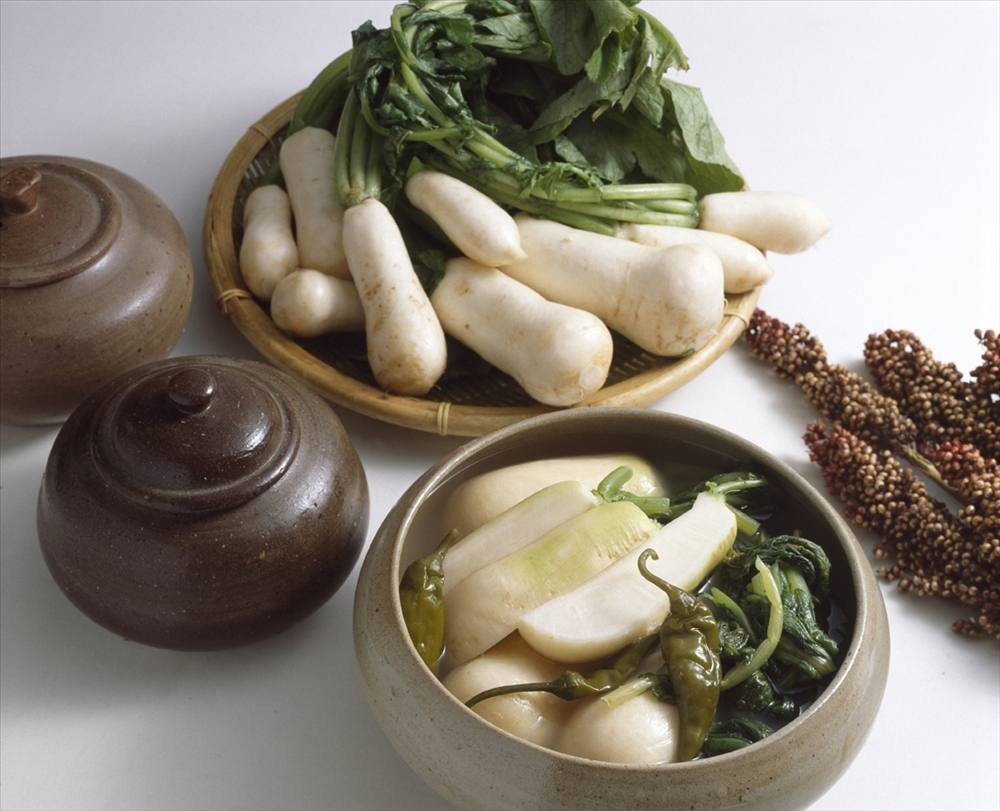
Dongchimi (radish water kimchi) made with chonggak radishes

== See also ==
- Korean radish
- Gegeol radish
- Young summer radish
