= Gegeol radish =

Variety of flowering plant

Gegeolmu Gegeol radish
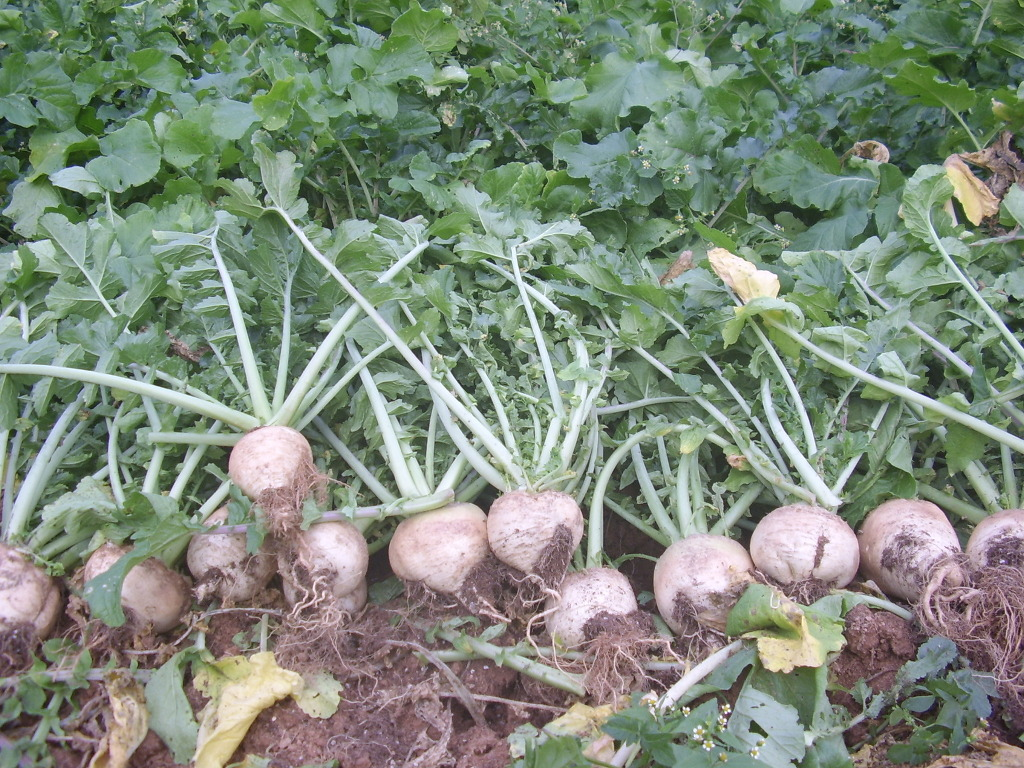
- Genus: Raphanus
- Species: R. raphanistrum
- Subspecies: R. raphanistrum subsp. sativus
- Cultivar group: White radish
- Cultivar: Gegeolmu / Gegeol radish
- Origin: Korea

Korean name
- Hangul: 게걸무
- RR: gegeolmu
- MR: kegŏlmu
- IPA: ke.ɡʌl.mu

Gegeolmu, or gegeol radish, is a variety of white radish. It is a round, pungent radish with a thick rind and firm flesh that does not get soft even after a few years of storage as kimchi.

Being a speciality crop of Icheon and Yeoju in Korea, gegeol radish has been included in the Ark of Taste, an international catalogue of endangered heritage foods.

== Description ==
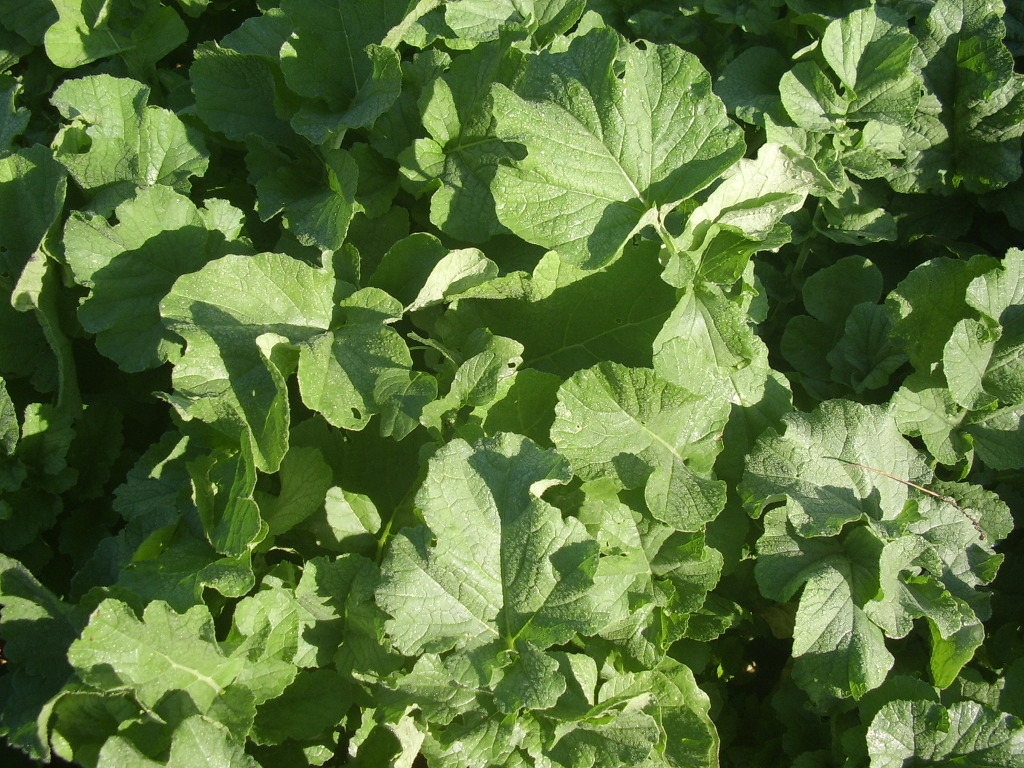
Gegeol radish leaves

The gegeol radish, smaller and firmer than regular Korean radishes, weighs about 500 grams (18 oz), including the taproot and the greens. This bulbous conical or napiform root vegetable is about 6–7 centimetres (2.4–2.8 in) in diameter and 20 centimetres (7.9 in) in circumference. Its greens tend to grow outward rather than upward.

Compared to regular Korean radishes, the gegeol radish has a lower water content but more protein, fibre, and minerals (magnesium, potassium, and calcium). It also has a higher content of a sulfur compound that is responsible for its sharper taste. With regard to enzymes, the protease and myrosinase activities of the Gegeol radish are higher but the α-amylose activity is lower than regular Korean radishes.

== Cultivation ==
The gegeol radish has traditionally been grown in cotton fields or soybean fields in the Icheon and Yeoju areas of South Korea for household consumption, in between the rows of the main crops. More recently, it has also been cultivated as a local specialty crop for commercial purposes.

Either the seeds or the roots are planted in early spring. In late spring or early summer, the seeds for the next spring can be gathered. The young leaves can be harvested throughout the spring, summer, and autumn for use as namul vegetables. In autumn, the entire plant is harvested.

== Culinary use ==
Because of the pungent cruciferous flavour, the roots of the gegeol radish are often consumed after having been salted and buried in the ground during the winter. The greens are used fresh or dried in namuls, soups, and other dishes.

Ingredients

- gegeolmu-jocheong or gegeol radish syrup – made by the usual jocheong (rice syrup)-making process, but substituting water with radish juice, squeezed out from boiled down gegeol radishes.
- gegeolmu-ssi-gireum or gegeol radish seed oil – made by pressing gegeol radish seeds.
- mucheong – radish greens, dried to make siraegi or used fresh in cooking.
- mu-mallaengi – dried radish, prepared by julienning radishes and sun-drying them.
- siraegi – dried radish greens. Gegeol radish siraegi makes a good addition to dak-bokkeum-tang.

Dishes

- gegeolmu-dongchimi – a type of dongchimi (radish water kimchi), made by pouring boiled and then cooled water onto sliced and salted gegeol radishes, pickled chilli, and the ingredients that are put in a cheesecloth bag: apples, pears, garlics, gingers, chili seeds, scallions, and mustard greens. The ingredients in the cheesecloth bag are taken out after 20–30 days.
- gegeolmu-kimchi – a type of kimchi, made by marinating diced and salted gegeol radish with lightly salted mustard greens and seasoning. The seasoning can be made by boiling glutinous rice powder in water, cooling it, and mixing in fish sauce, chili powder, chopped scallions, minced garlic, grated ginger, and plum syrup. It is a salty kimchi that lasts more than three years.
- gegeolmu-jangajji – a type of jangajji (pickled dish), made by dying diced and salted gegeol radish with gardenia seed water, then soaking it in brine and letting it age.

Tea and desserts

- gegeolmu-cha or gegeol radish tea – made by dry-frying sliced gegeol radishes. The tea is known as a natural antioxidant and also helps with respiratory ailments or light digestive problems.
- gegeolmu-jeonggwa – a type of jeonggwa, made by salting thinly sliced gegeol radishes overnight and draining it, then soaking them in rice syrup for 10 minutes and drying the soaked pieces on a tray for a day. When properly dried, the pieces are made into flower shapes.
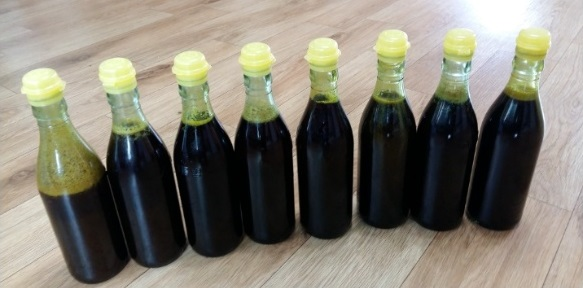
Gegeol radish seed oil

== See also ==
- Chonggak radish
- Korean radish
- Young summer radish
