= Banchan =

Korean side dishes

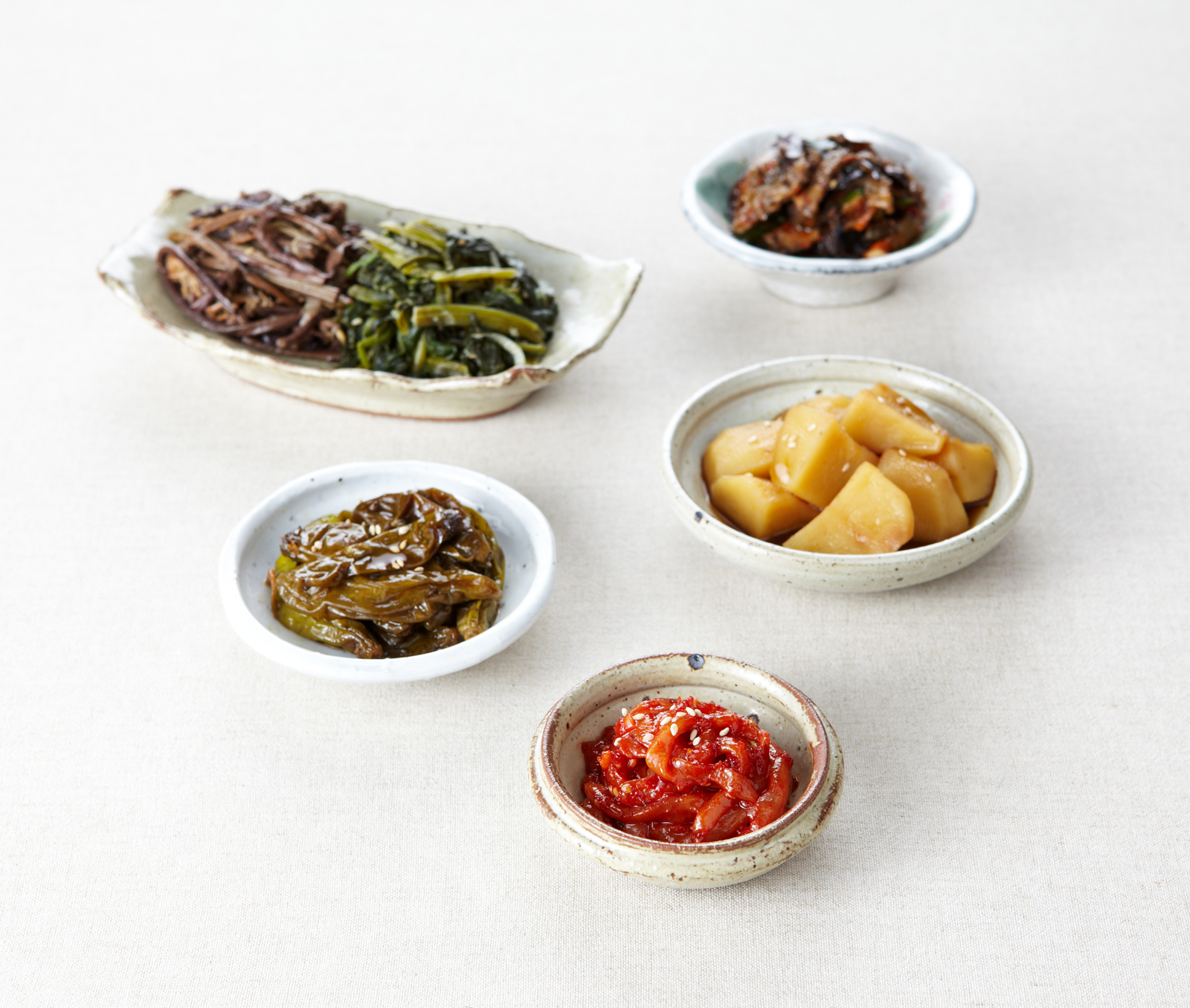

Korean name
- Hangul: 반찬
- Hanja: 飯饌
- RR: banchan
- MR: panch'an
- IPA: pan.tɕʰan

Banchan (/ˈbɑːntʃɑːn/ BAHN-chahn; Korean: 반찬; Hanja: 飯饌; IPA: [pantɕʰan]) are small side dishes served along with cooked rice in Korean cuisine. Banchan are often set in the middle of the table to be shared. At the center of the table is the secondary main course, such as galbi or bulgogi, and a shared pot of jjigae. Bowls of cooked rice and guk (soup) are set individually. Banchan are served in small portions, meant to be finished at each meal and replenished during the meal if not enough. Usually, the more formal the meals are, the more banchan there will be. Jeolla Province is particularly famous for serving many different varieties of banchan in a single meal.

The basic table setting for a meal called bansang usually consists of bap (밥, cooked rice), guk or tang (soup), gochujang or ganjang, jjigae, and kimchi. According to the number of banchan added, the table setting is called 3 cheop (삼첩), 5 cheop (오첩), 7 cheop (칠첩), 9 cheop (구첩), 12 cheop (십이첩) bansang, with the 12 cheop used in Korean royal cuisine. Note that kimchi is not included in the cheop count. People would have different amounts of banchan depending on their class; a king would have 12, with others usually having less.

== History ==
Banchan is thought to be a result of Buddhist influence at around the mid-Three Kingdoms period and the subsequent proscription against eating meat by the monarchies of these kingdoms. Thus, with the ban on meat-containing dishes, vegetable-based dishes rose in prominence and became the focal point of Korean cuisine; court kitchens developed various methods for cooking, preparing and presenting these dishes, while less-affluent commoners produced smaller, simpler arrays of these vegetable-based dishes.

Although the Mongol invasions of Korea ended the ban on meat-containing dishes, as well as meat offerings for rituals such as jesa, approximately six centuries of vegetable-based cuisine in the form of banchan had imprinted itself into Korean cuisine.

During the Joseon Dynasty, Buddhism was shunned while Confucianism remained the dominant ideology that was followed. Tea was no longer served in the palace and slowly began to dwindle, however, the ceremony of tea and rice cakes as snacks endured. Through food, the Joseon kings were able to see the living conditions of their people. "Accordingly, royal cuisine in the final period of the Joseon Dynasty was borne out of a culture of restraint based on Confucian ideology, but experienced changes after the 18th century as taste and personal preference became more dominant values". Whilst personal preference became more dominant, there was still a weight placed on the significance of formalities, which is a characteristically Confucian mindset. The Kobaeumsik, a religious food served layer upon layer, said to symbolize the power of the King, is a prime example of the Confucian esthetic elements prevalent in Korean cuisine.

Royal cuisine placed an enormous weight on the philosophy of Yaksikdongwon or the health purpose of food. The goal was to create nutritionally balanced food that also achieved synergy and a sense of balance between Yin and Yang.

"The Korean Empire was also influenced by foreign cuisine, and western-style banquets were held in Deoksugung Palace. King Kojong is known to have been a fan of coffee. As Emperor Sunjong took the throne, royal cuisine was introduced to the common people through royal chefs and cooks".

In the olden days, it is believed that the 12 banchan setting was for people with a higher ranking such as the king or emperor while the rest of the noble family members would have a maximum of 9 banchan served. The different banchan setting was used to distinguish the power and hierarchy between the royals.

Fermenting was traditionally preferred for preserving food because cooking oil was in short supply in Korea, in contrast to China where frying and pickling were preferred. The prominence of fermented and preserved foods in bansang is due to the need to apply a preservation method that could survive harsh winters and summers filled with extreme temperatures. Due to their focus on agriculture, the main ingredients in their fermented foods were grains and vegetables. The fermentation process is necessary, as most parts of the Korean peninsula are isolated by mountains from all sides. The fermentation of grains, beans, fish and vegetables allowed for the preservation of nutrients as well as the food itself. The act of fermentation as well as the other varied cooking methods have created unforeseen health benefits that are being studied by food scientists in the modern age. Additionally, this process of fermentation can be used to enrich the flavor profile of food with the use of gochujang. Kimchi is a perfect example of this enriched food utilizing the flavor and fermentation process together. Banchan is mainly seasoned with fermented soy products, medicinal herbs, and sesame or perilla oils.

Gochujang was added to enhance each meal, and the production of gochujang was so vital to Korean cuisine that it was stated in the Hurbaekjeongjip, a 15th-century book written by Gwidal Hong, that "the quality of gochujang decided the farming success of that year". Gochujang is a chief seasoning and fermentation agent of many banchan: this has been the case for centuries. There are other jang used not only for their fermentation and nutrition merits, but also their flavor as a dipping sauce, and there are many types of jang that are referenced in Korean historical texts. One example of jang is chojang (vinegar sauce) that was used as a dipping sauce. Chojang was made by mixing gochujang with honey, vinegar, and ground pine nuts; mustard powder or whole mustard would be added to water and ground, then vinegar, salt and sugar would be added before leaving the mixture upside down in a warm place. Mustard was an additional important seasoning used to enrich the flavor of the foods.

For the fermentation of vegetables, jangkwa (pickled vegetables and fruit) were served. These dishes were created by pickling the different seasonal vegetables with kanjang, gochujang, and doenjang. However, in the palace, jangkwa also referred to a dish made by pickling cucumber, radish, young radish, parsley, or cabbage heart with salt, then drying it in the sun to remove all moisture; the vegetables were then stir-fried with beef, shredded red pepper, sesame oil, and sesame and salt.

== Varieties ==
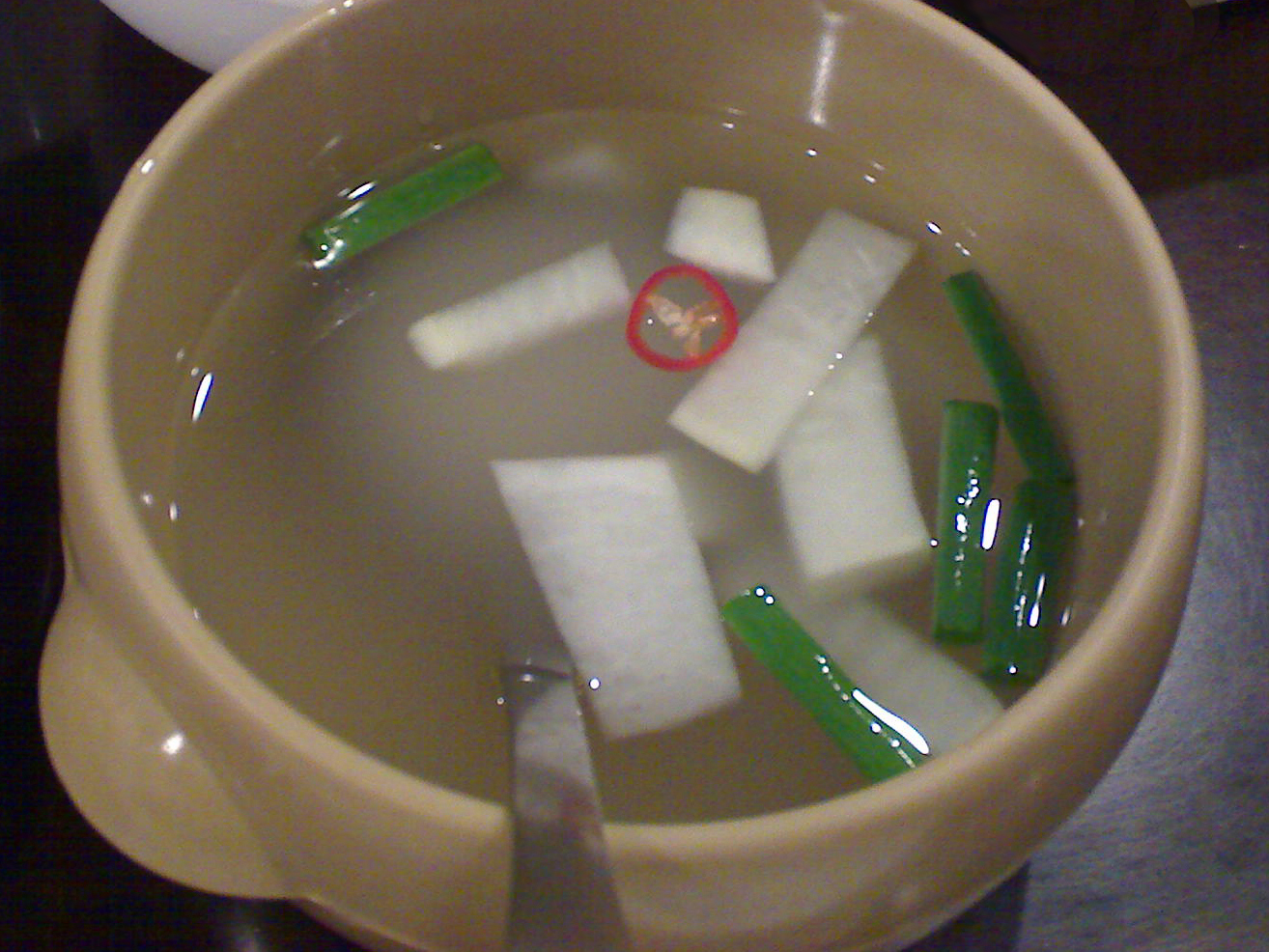
Dongchimi (동치미)

=== Kimchi ===
Kimchi is a popular banchan which requires vegetables to undergo a fermentation process with different Korean spices. Kimchi is high in dietary fiber and low in calories, but is also high in many different nutrients that can be beneficial for the body. Through the fermentation process, kimchi produces vitamins and minerals including B-complex vitamins.

Kimchi is fermented vegetables, usually baechu (napa cabbage), seasoned with chili peppers and salt. This is the essential banchan of a standard Korean meal. Some Koreans do not consider a meal complete without kimchi. Kimchi can be made with other vegetables as well, including scallions, gat (갓), and radish (무; mu).

Name	Korean name	Description
Nabak-kimchi	나박김치	Watery kimchi with less spicy baechu and mu
Dongchimi	동치미	Various vegetables in white brine. Nabak kimchi and dongchimi are referred to as mul kimchi (물김치), literally "water kimchi."
Geotjeori	겉절이	Freshly made kimchi to be eaten crisp without fermenting. Usually made with baechu and lettuce.
Kkakdugi	깍두기	A kimchi made with cubed mu (white radish)
Oi sobagi	오이 소박이	Stuffed cucumber kimchi, stuffed with chili, spring onions and buchu
Chonggak kimchi	총각김치	Whole mu with chili pepper seasoning. It is made with dallangmu, about the same size as sausages.
Yeolmu-kimchi	열무김치	Thin and small young summer radish kimchi, which can be prepared either with or without fermented jeotgal.
Pa kimchi	파김치	Hot and salty scallion kimchi, seasoned with much myeolchijeot, the Korean version of salted anchovies.
Gat kimchi	갓김치	Indian mustard leaf kimchi with a large amount of red pepper powder and unique bitter taste and aroma. Strong myeolchijeot and glutinous rice paste are added to reduce the hot and bitter taste.

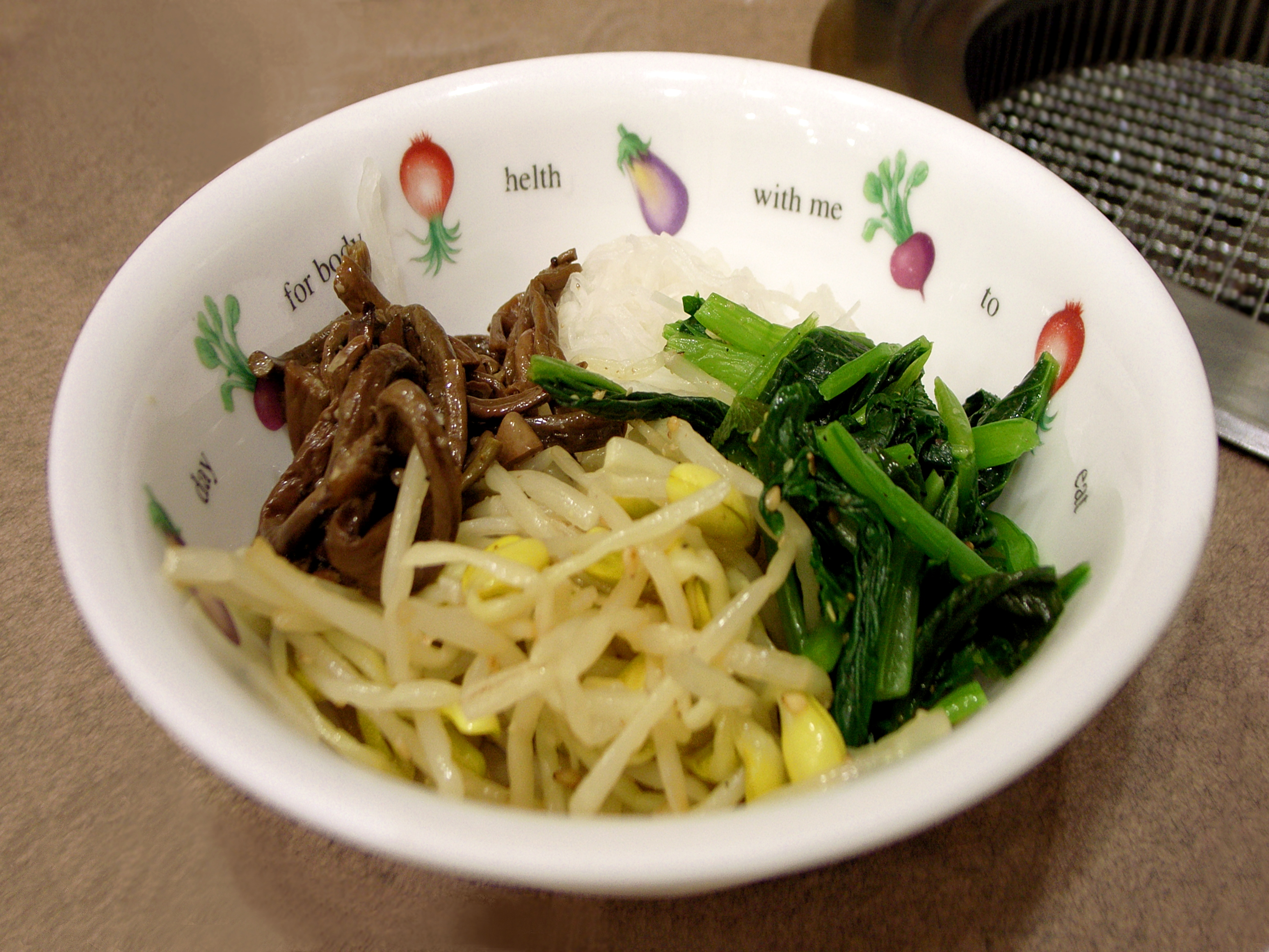
Various namul

=== Namul ===
Namul (나물) refers to steamed, marinated, or stir-fried vegetables, usually seasoned with sesame oil, salt, vinegar, minced garlic, chopped green onions, dried chili peppers, and soy sauce.

Name	Korean name	Description
Kongnamul	콩나물	Cold boiled bean sprouts with sesame oil.
Sigeumchi namul	시금치나물	Lightly parboiled spinach dressed with sesame oil, garlic, and soy sauce.
Miyeok muchim	미역무침	Miyeok (wakame, a seaweed) with sweet vinegar and salt.
Musaengchae/Muchae	무생채/무채	Long julienned white radish in a sweet vinegar sauce, sometimes with ground dried chili peppers.
Gosari namul	고사리나물	Prepared fern shoots that have been stir-fried.
Chwinamul	취나물	Stir-fried and seasoned roots of Doellingeria scabra.
Bireum namul	비름나물	Parboiled and seasoned amaranthus.
Naengi namul	냉이나물	Parboiled and seasoned shepherd's purse.
Dolnamul	돌나물	Raw sedum with pepper sauce dressing.
Gogumasun namul	고구마순나물	Boiled and seasoned sweet potato shoots.
Gaji namul	가지나물	Boiled eggplant.
Doraji namul	도라지나물	Boiled Chinese bellflower roots.

=== Bokkeum ===
Bokkeum (볶음) is a dish stir-fried with sauce.

- Kimchi bokkeum (김치볶음) – Stir-fried kimchi, often with pork (similar to jeyook bokkeum).
- Jeyuk bokkeum (제육볶음) – Stir-fried pork with gochujang (chili pepper paste) sauce and onions.
- Ojingeochae bokkeum (오징어채볶음) – Stir-fried dried shredded squid seasoned with a mixture of gochujang (chili pepper paste), garlic, and mullyeot (syrup-like condiment).
- Nakji bokkeum (낙지볶음) – Stir-fried baby octopus in spicy gochujang sauce.
- Beoseot bokkeum (버섯볶음) – Stir-fried mushrooms such as pyogo, oyster mushrooms, pine mushrooms.
- Myeolchi bokkeum (멸치볶음) – Stir-fried dried anchovies.

=== Jorim ===
Jorim is a dish simmered in a seasoned broth.

- Dubu-jorim (두부조림) – Tofu simmered in diluted soy sauce, a little bit of sesame oil, minced garlic, and chopped green onion.
- Jang-jorim (장조림) – Beef simmered in soy sauce, optionally with hard-boiled eggs or hard-boiled quail eggs.

=== Jjim ===
Jjim is a steamed dish.

- Gyeran-jjim (계란찜) – Mixed and seasoned eggs steamed in a hot pot, sometimes add some very small cut carrot.
- Saengseon jjim (생선찜) – Steamed fish.

=== Jeon ===
Jeon denotes a variety of pan-fried, pancake-like dishes. Buchimgae is a near synonym.

- Pajeon (파전) – Thin pancakes with scallions.
- Kimchijeon (김치전) – Thin pancakes with old (ripe) kimchi.
- Gamjajeon (감자전) – Korean-style potato pancakes.
- Saengseon-jeon (생선전) – Small portions of fish coated with eggs and pan-fried.
- Donggeurang ttaeng (동그랑땡) – Patty made with tofu, meat and vegetables, coated with eggs and pan-fried.
- Yukjeon (육전) – Bite-sized beef coated in flour and egg and grilled in a pan.

=== Others ===
- Danmuji (단무지) – A pickled radish marinated in a natural yellow dye made from gardenia fruit.
- Gyeran-mari (계란말이) – A rolled omelet served in slices.
- Japchae (잡채) – A stand-alone dish in its own right, japchae can also be eaten as banchan. Japchae is glass noodles accompanied with a variety of vegetables and beef in a slightly sweet garlic sauce.
- Korean-style potato salad (감자 샐러드) with apples and carrots.
- Morkovcha – Koryo-saram carrot salad, based on kimchi

== Gallery ==
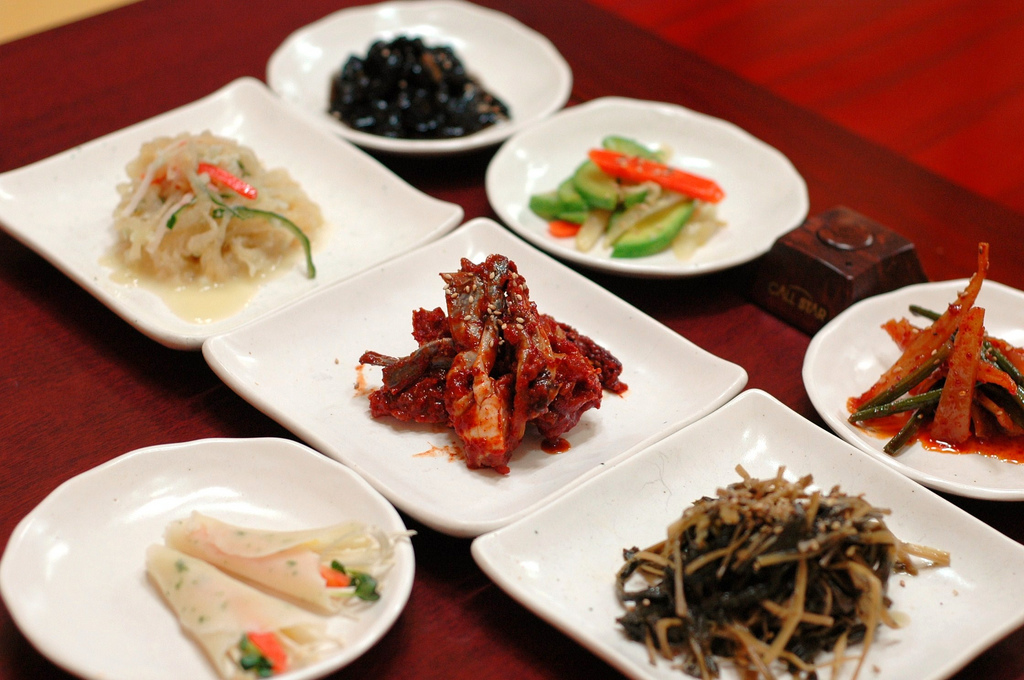
Various banchan served at a table

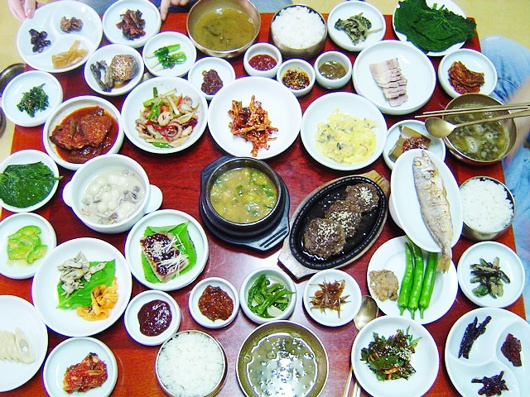
Table setting in Jeolla Province with many banchan

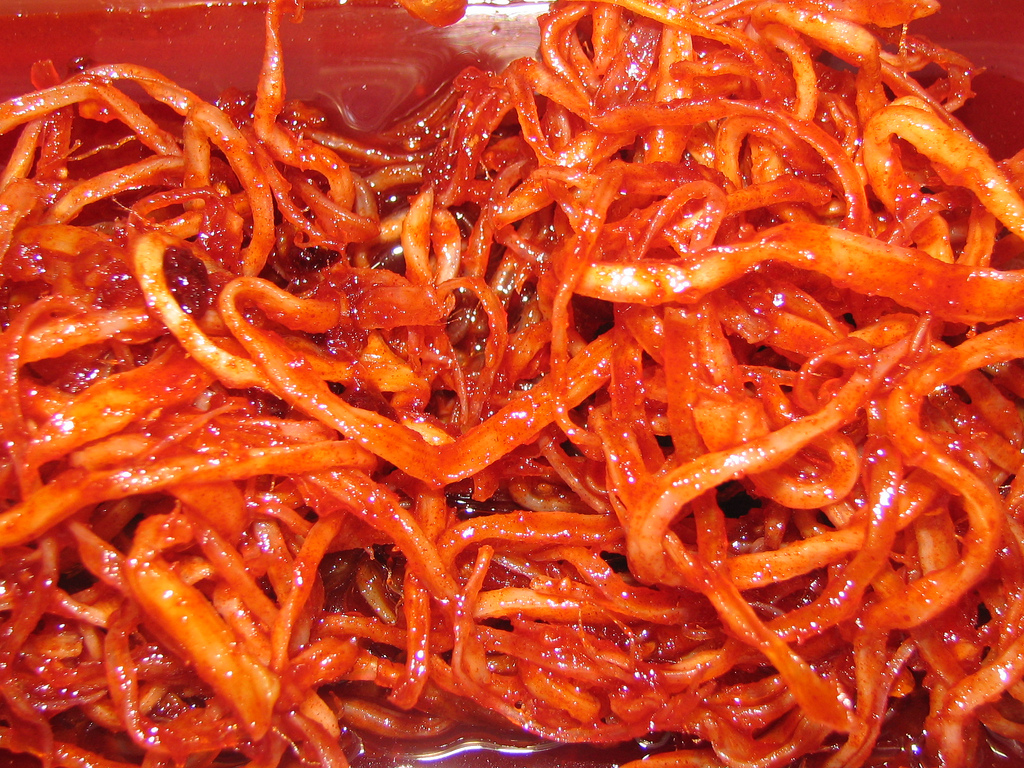
Ojingeochae bokkeum (오징어채볶음)

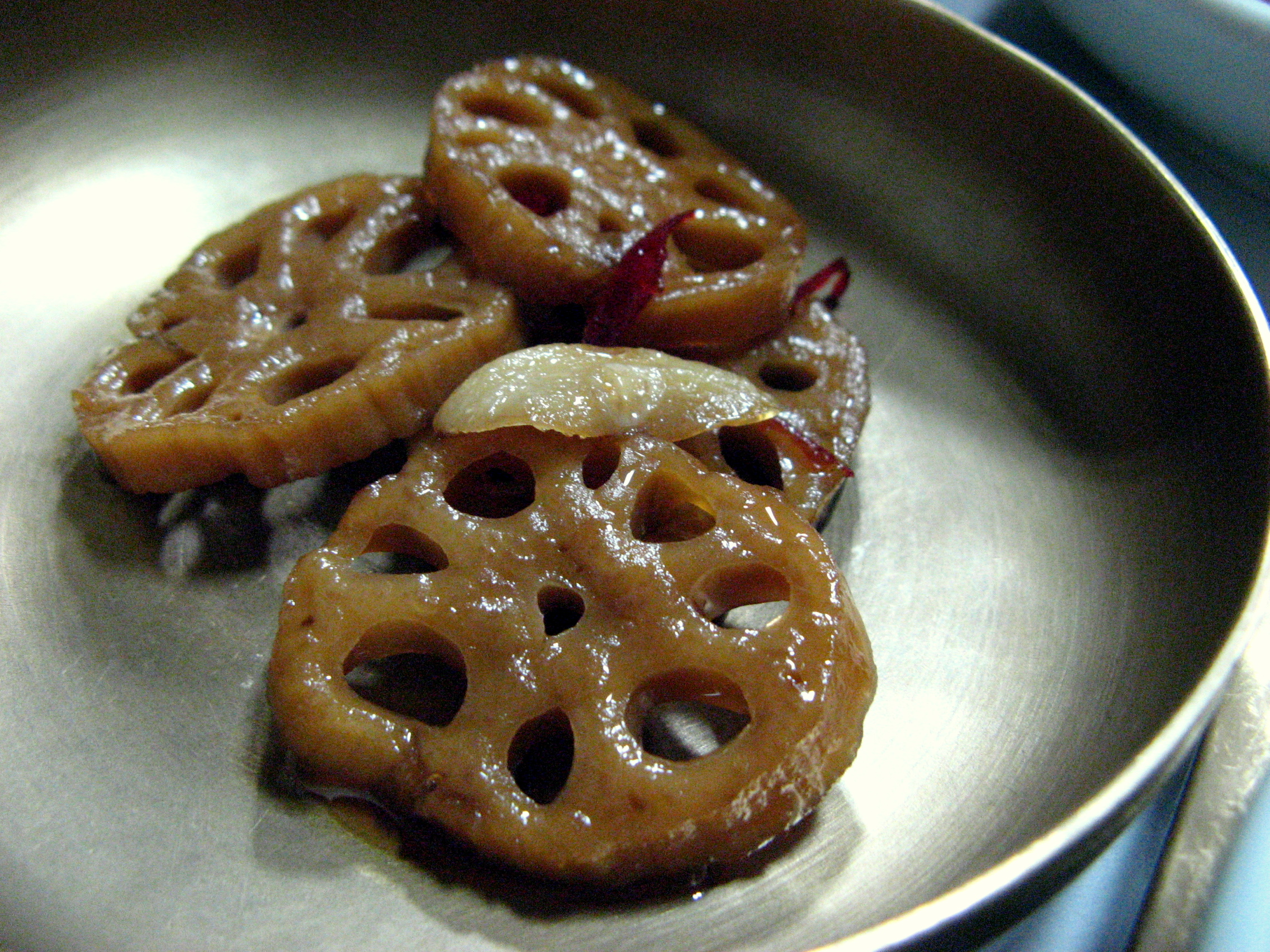
Yeongeun jorim (연근조림)

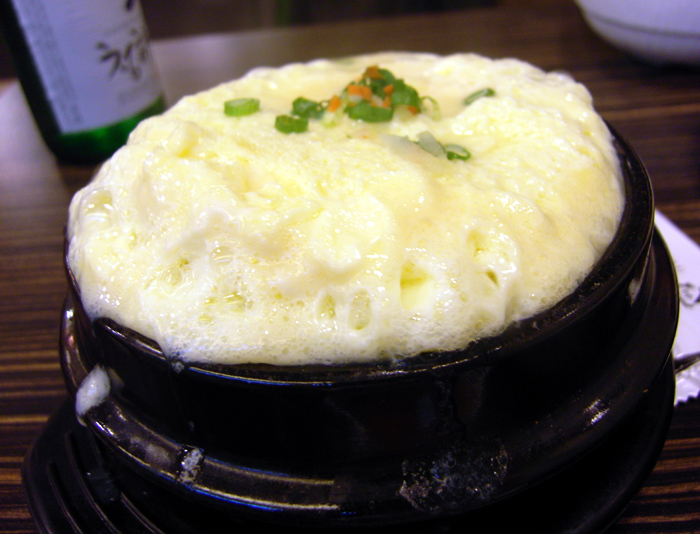
Gyeran jjim (계란찜) in a hot ttukbaegi

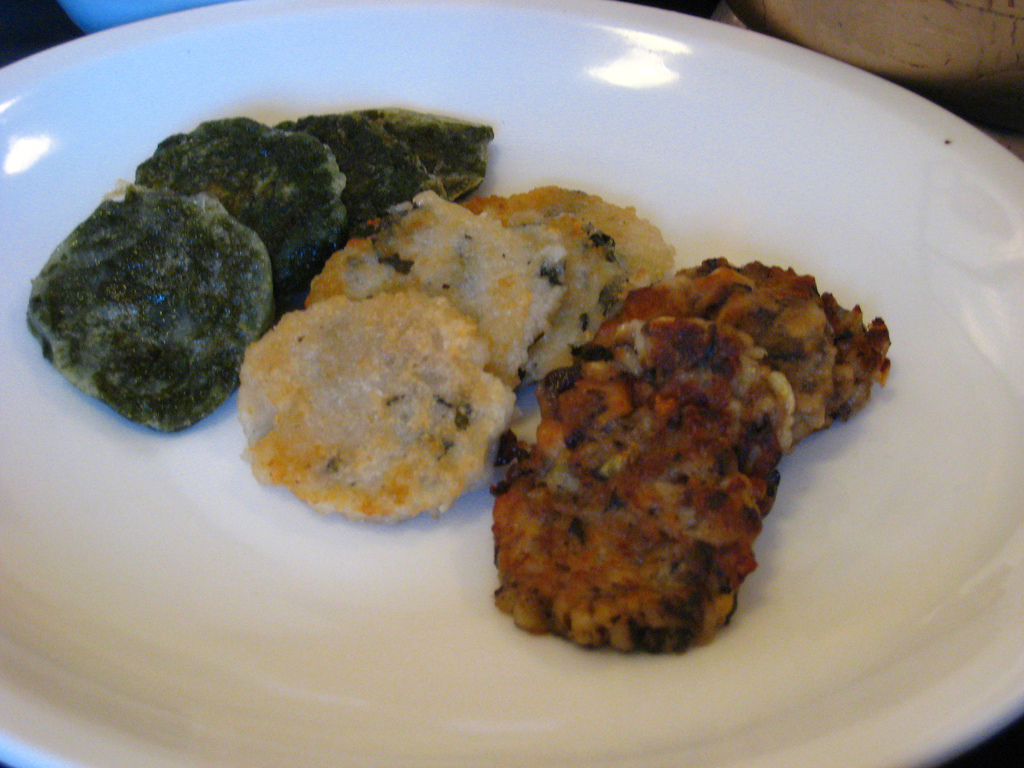
Samsaek jeon (삼색전); any three different colored jeon are referred to as such

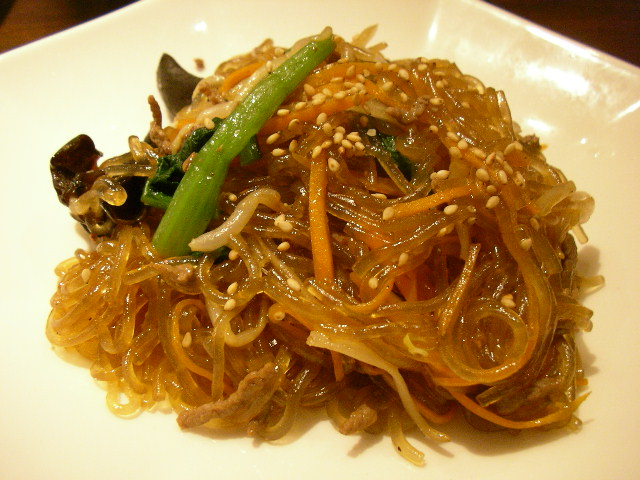
Japchae

== See also ==
- Korean table d'hôte
- Beyaynetu
- Kamayan
- Okazu
- Meze
- Smörgåsbord
- Thali
