= Yeolmu-kimchi =

Korean pickle of summer radish leaves

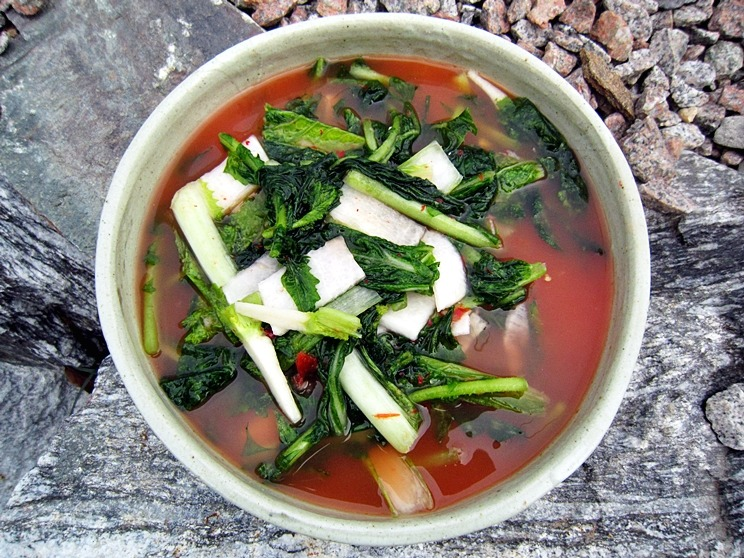
- Alternative names: Young summer radish kimchi
- Type: Kimchi
- Place of origin: Korea
- Main ingredients: Yeolmu (young summer radish)
- Food energy (per 100 g serving): 32 kcal (130 kJ)

Korean name
- Hangul: 열무김치
- RR: yeolmugimchi
- MR: yŏlmugimch'i
- IPA: [jʌl.mu.ɡim.tɕʰi]

Yeolmu-kimchi (Korean: 열무김치) or young summer radish kimchi is one of the many types of kimchi, a popular banchan (Korean side dish). Although the yeolmu (young summer radish) has a small and thin taproot that does not have much use, its thick and abundant green leaves are constantly used throughout spring and summer to make yeolmu-kimchi. Yeolmu-kimchi is popular in the summer and is often eaten with cold noodles.

== Preparation ==
Withered and rugged leaves are removed from the yeolmu. The roots are washed and remain uncut, but the ends are trimmed. It is then sprinkled with salt water. Cut scallions, bell pepper, and mashed garlic and ginger are added.

== Health ==
Due to the softness and flavor of the leaves, they are the primary ingredients in many foods instead of its roots (the white radish). The leaves are alkaline in nature and are rich in fiber, vitamin A, vitamin C, and low in calories. When picking out yeolmu, young, small and thin ones are recommended over the aged yeolmu, which tend to be thicker. It is recommended that yeolmu be eaten as soon as possible due to the fact that it withers quickly. Any leftovers are to be stored in the refrigerator.

Nutritional composition of typical kimchi
Nutrients	per 100 g	Nutrients	per 100 g
Food energy	32 kcal	Moisture	88.4 g
Crude protein	2.0 g	Crude Lipid	0.6 g
Total sugar	1.3 g	Crude fiber	1.2 g
Crude ash	0.5 g	Calcium	45 mg
Phosphorus	28 mg	Vitamin A	492 IU
Vitamin B_{1}	0.03 mg	Vitamin B_{2}	0.06 mg
Niacin	2.1 mg	Vitamin C	21 mg

== Popularity ==
On January 30, 2013, yeolmu-kimchi was voted as the people's favourite type of kimchi (excluding napa cabbage kimchi, which is the most commonly eaten type of kimchi) in an online poll. In the poll, which involved a total of 3,532 bloggers, yeolmu-kimchi received 875 (24.8%) votes. Dongchimi came second with 13.9% of the votes.
