= Kkomakjjim =

Korean seafood dish

- Associated cuisine: Korean cuisine

Korean name
- Hangul: 꼬막찜
- RR: kkomakjjim
- MR: kkomaktchim

Kkomak-jjim (Korean: 꼬막찜) or seasoned cockle clams, is a popular seafood banchan (side-dish) widely enjoyed by Koreans year-round but especially considered a summer delicacy. Komak (꼬막) is a low-fat, low-calorie seafood, rich in protein and crucial amino acids which help to detoxify the liver after drinking. It is also a good source of iron, which is good for both women and the elderly.

It consists of small edible saltwater cockle clams. The clams selected for cooking have two distinct characteristics:

- The skin of the cockle should be intact and not broken,
- The wave pattern of the shell should be clean and clear.

== Haegam: cleaning clams ==
The chosen clams are at first cleaned spotlessly. In order to cook the cockles properly and scrumptiously, the clams are blanched in a way that they don't dry out. If boiled for too long, the cockles not only become tough and tasteless but also lose their nutrients simultaneously. The process of cleaning and boiling the clams most appropriately is called haegam (해감). There are two ways to do it. They are:

1. The cleaned clams are first soaked in cold water with a pinch of salt. The bowl is then sealed with a wrap or a foil and refrigerated for at least an hour. The cold salty water acts like seawater which makes the clams expectorate sand from inside, if they have any.
2. The clams are cleaned well with a brush and then soaked for around three hours in salt water to remove any dirt inside them.

== Preparation ==
After completing haegam, a large amount of water is put in the cooking pot. When the water begins to boil, a small amount of cold water is added, and then the cockle clams. The shell of the clam begins to open gradually when the water begins again to boil. If the shell doesn't open even after cooking it for an ample amount of time, with the help of a spoon or chopsticks, the mouth can be pushed open.

Although the cooking time varies depending on the number of clams, it shouldn't exceed a couple of minutes at full boil.

=== Seasoning ===
The steamed cockle clams are then garnished with a soy sauce-based seasoning.

The soy sauce-based seasoning generally contains chili peppers, red and green, finely chopped. Green onions or scallions (파; pa) and minced garlic combined with sesame seeds (참깨; chamkkae), sesame oil (참기름; chamgireum) and Korean chili powder (고춧가루; gochutgaru).
