= Hanjeongsik =

Korean buffet-style meal

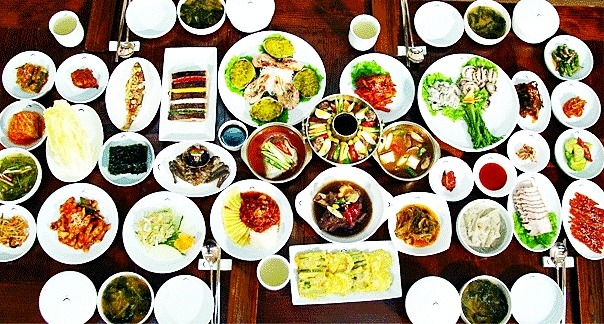

Korean name
- Hangul: 한정식
- Hanja: 韓定食
- RR: hanjeongsik
- MR: hanjŏngsik
- IPA: [han.dʑʌŋ.ɕik̚]

Hanjeongsik (Korean: 한정식), sometimes translated as Korean table d'hôte, is a Korean-style full-course meal characterized by the array of small banchan plates in varied colours.

Cheonil Sikdang, the seventh-oldest active restaurant in South Korea, specializes in hanjeongsik.

== See also ==
- Bap (rice)
- Guk (soup)
- Banchan (side dishes)
- Table d'hôte
- Meze (Middle Eastern/Balkan meal)
- Smörgåsbord (Scandinavian meal)
- Thali (South and Southeast Asian meal)
