= Cheonil Sikdang =

Historic restaurant in Haenam County, South Korea

Restaurant information
- Established: 1924; 101 years ago
- Food type: Korean cuisine, Korean table d'hôte
- Location: 20-8 Eupnae-gil, Haenam-eup, Haenam County, South Jeolla Province, South Korea
- Coordinates: 34.5705°N 126.5993°E
- Website: www.해남천일식당.kr

Cheonil Sikdang (Korean: 천일식당) is a historic restaurant in Haenam County, South Jeolla Province, South Korea. It the seventh-oldest operating restaurant in South Korea, having been established in 1924. It specializes in Korean table d'hôte (hanjeongsik): a large spread of numerous small Korean side dishes.

The restaurant has reportedly been consistently famous in South Jeolla Province and across South Korea, and has remained family-owned. It was reportedly frequented by significant politicians in the country, and its food was delivered to the South Korean presidential residence the Blue House a number of times. The restaurant now has a branch in Seoul called Haenam Cheonilgwan (해남천일관) was opened in the mid-1990s.

== Description ==
The restaurant is reportedly reputed for its tteok-galbi (short rib patties) and kimchi. It reportedly serves dozens of side dishes at each table. The restaurant claims to have no secret recipes, and only focuses on the quality of its ingredients and execution of its cooking.

== History ==
The restaurant was first established in 1924 as Cheonilgwan (천일관) by Park Seong-sun (박성순; 朴成順). She was the breadwinner for her family, as her yangban husband reportedly had little interest in working. She set up a roadside food stall and began selling a variety of namul dishes and soups. Her stand reportedly became popular, with even local officials seeking it out. As eating at such a stall was inconvenient, they asked her to create a restaurant building. That became Cheonilgwan. The original location of the restaurant is located within the innermost part of the current complex; it was a thatched-roof hanok building. As hanjeongsik was prohibitively expensive for regular people around this time, its customers were mainly aristocrats.

In 1950, the original hut was torn down and replaced with a more modern building. After the second generation Lee Jeong-rye (이정례; 李正禮) took over the restaurant, she changed its name to Cheonil Sikdang. Around that time, tteok-galbi became the restaurant's signature dish. Park would eventually die in 1973. Lee died in 1990; in 1988 Oh Hyeon-hwa (오현화; 吳賢華) took over.

Since early in its history, the restaurant has been consistently popular among the elite in South Korea. South Korean leader Park Chung Hee ate at the restaurant four times. The food has reportedly been delivered to the South Korean former presidential residence the Blue House on a number of occasions. Reportedly, on one occasion Park Seong-sun refused to go by car to the Blue House because she would easily get carsick, so Park Chung Hee offered her a helicopter ride to Seoul. South Korean leader Ahn Woo-man, Minister of Justice, dined at the restaurant in 1995. Mayor of Seoul Goh Kun ate there in 1997. In spite of this, the restaurant's customer base is reportedly diverse, with various socioeconomic classes eating together.
