= Nabak-kimchi =

Variant of the Korean dish kimchi

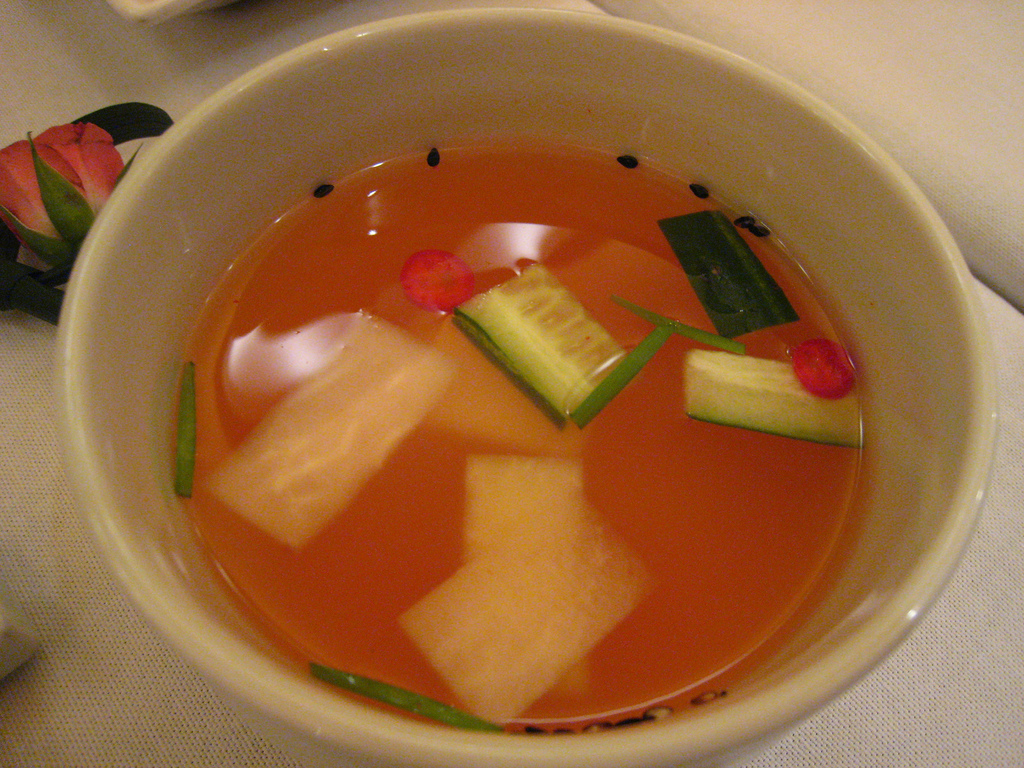
- Type: Kimchi
- Place of origin: Korea
- Main ingredients: Korean radish
- Ingredients generally used: Chili pepper, scallions, Java waterdropwort
- Similar dishes: Dongchimi

Korean name
- Hangul: 나박김치
- RR: nabakgimchi
- MR: nabakkimch'i
- IPA: [na.bak̚.k͈im.tɕʰi]

Nabak-kimchi (Korean: 나박김치) is a dish in Korean cuisine. It is a watery variety of the dish kimchi and is similar to dongchimi.

== Background ==
It is made of Korean radish and napa cabbage (called baechu (배추) in Korean) as main ingredients, thinly sliced into rectangular shapes, salted and mixed with vegetables and spices such as cucumber, scallion, Java water dropwort (called minari (미나리) in Korean), garlic, ginger, red chilies, chili pepper powder, sugar, salt, and water.

Nabak gimchi looks similar to dongchimi in form but is commonly consumed during spring and summer, whereas dongchimi is most commonly eaten in winter. Chili pepper powder is added to make nabak kimchi, resulting in a rose pink color as opposed to the white-colored dongchimi.

The term nabak originated from nabaknabak (나박나박) which is a Korean adverb for "making flattened" or "slicing thinly".
