= Kkakdugi =

Kimchi variety made with diced radish

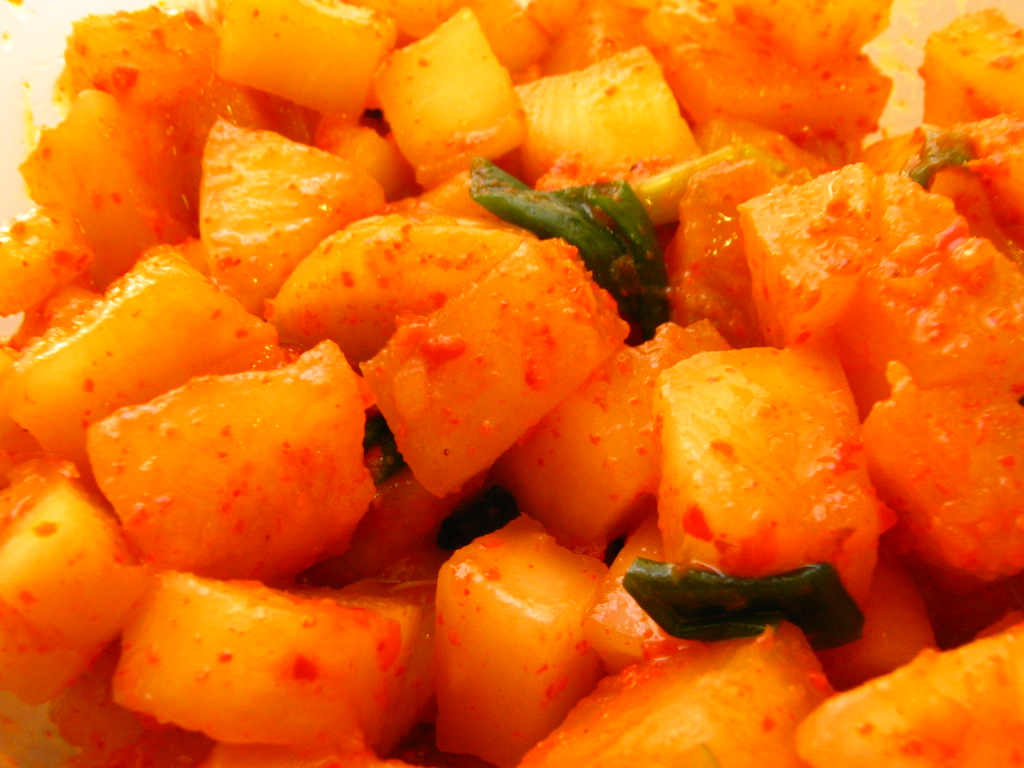

Korean name
- Hangul: 깍두기
- RR: kkakdugi
- MR: kkaktugi

Kkakdugi (Korean: 깍두기) or diced radish kimchi is a variety of kimchi in Korean cuisine. Usually, Korean radish (called mu 무 in Korean) is used, but other vegetables or fruits can also be used. Kkakduk-kkakduk is an ideophone related to dicing/cubing. Kimchi made with radish that are not diced into cubes are not called kkakdugi. Kkakdugi is a popular banchan (side dish) enjoyed by Koreans and others.

== Origin and history ==
The origin of kkakdugi is mentioned in a cookbook named Joseon yorihak (조선요리학 朝鮮料理學, literally "Korean Gastronomy") written by Hong Seon-pyo (홍선표) in 1940. According to the book, kkakdugi was created by Princess Sukseon (숙선옹주; 淑善翁主), a daughter of King Jeongjo (r. 1776–1800) and the wife of Hong Hyeon-ju (홍현주; 洪顯周), a high-ranking government officer titled as Yeongmyeongwi (영명위; 永明慰). When a matter for congratulation happened to the royal court, members of the royal family gathered to have a feast, and the princess presented a new dish made with diced radish to the king. He highly praised it and asked her about the dish's name. She replied that the dish did not have a name because she had accidentally made it, but found that it tasted good, so she brought the new dish to the court. The king replied that the dish would be named kkakdugi because cutting food into cubes is called kkakduk sseolgi (깍둑썰기) in Korean. At that time, kkakdugi was called gakdokgi (각독기 刻毒氣, literally "removing the harshness"), from 각(刻) (gak, "to harm, damage") + 독(毒) (dok, "substance harmful to health or life") + 기(氣) (-gi, "energy, feeling, element"), and then became spread among the common people.

== Preparation ==
Kkakdugi consists of radish cut into small cubes. The radish is flavored with salt, red chili powder, spring onions, and ginger.

The radish and the other ingredients are mixed together and then traditionally stored in a jangdok (장독) or onggi, both names which refer to a large earthenware pot. Fermentation takes about two weeks in a cool, and dry place.

Kkakdugi is served cold and is usually consumed when the radish is crisp. Kkakdugi, along with other types of kimchi, is a popular dish in Korea and is believed to share many of the health benefits of kimchi, due to the fermentation process.

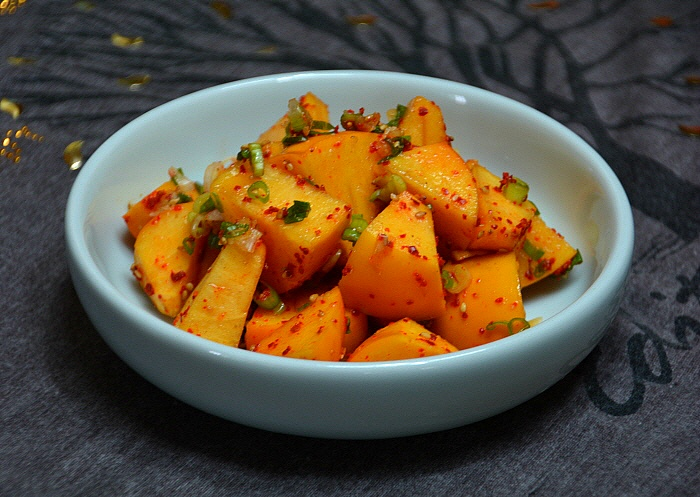
Kkakdugi made of persimmon

== Varieties ==
There are several main types of kkakdugi, which are all fairly similar in their ingredients and preparation:

- Regular kkakdugi
- Gul kkakdugi (굴깍두기) is a variety of kkakdugi that is flavored with whole raw oysters. It is made especially in winter around Korean New Year. Saeujeot (salted preserved shrimp) and Java waterdropwort leaves, along with other spices, are used for making this. Because of the use of oysters, gul kkakdugi has a comparatively short shelf life compared to other types of kkakdugi. It is most often consumed in Jeju Island and Seoul.
- Gegeolmu kkakdugi (게걸무깍두기) is made with gegeolmu (gegeol radish), a local specialty of the Yeoju region.
- Myeongtae seodeori kkakdugi (명태서더리깍두기) is made with the gills of Alaska pollock. Meongtae refers to the fish and seodeori means the offal of fish in Korean.
- Suk kkakdugi (숙깍두기) is made with diced radish that has been boiled, so it is reputed to be more easily digestible and therefore good for old people.
- Musongsongi (무송송이) is a form of kkakdugi once consumed in the royal court, whose name derives from the adverb songsong (송송) because the radish used for it is chopped and diced small.

== Food pairings ==
Korean soups such as seolleongtang (beef soup), galbitang (galbi, or beef rib soup), samgyetang (ginseng chicken soup) are considered "good friends" for kkakdugi.

The taste of the kkakdugi overpowers the taste of stew itself and gets rid of the distinctive smell of the stew. When eating meat in stew, kkakdugi is believed to aid in digestion.
