= Jangajji =

Korean pickled vegetable dish

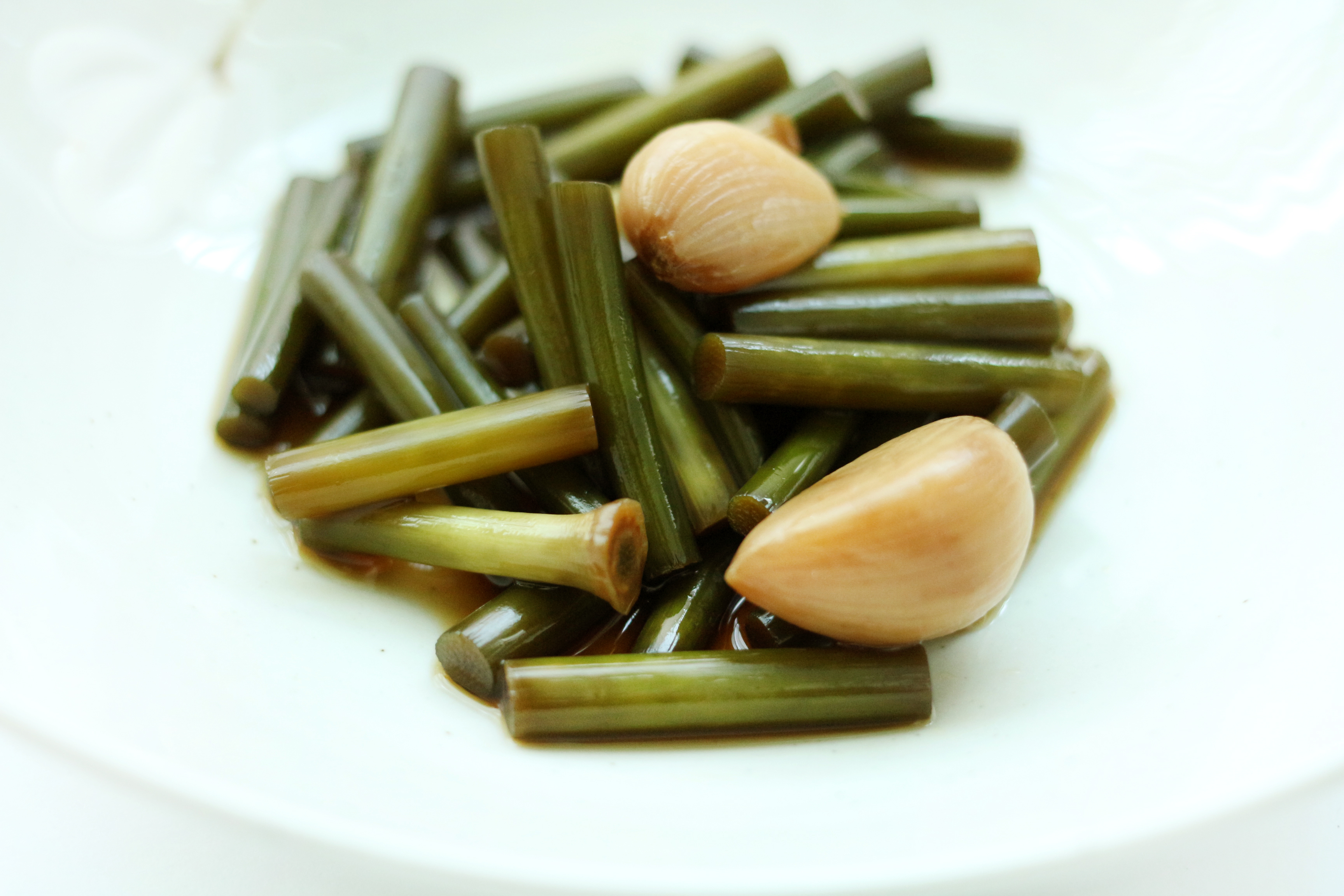
- maneul-jong-jangajji (pickled garlic scapes and cloves)
- Alternative names: Pickled vegetables
- Type: Pickles
- Course: Banchan
- Place of origin: Korea
- Associated cuisine: Korean cuisine

- Jangajji
- Hangul: 장아찌
- RR: jangajji
- MR: changatchi
- IPA: [tɕaŋ.a.t͈ɕi]

Jangajji (장아찌) or pickled vegetables is a type of banchan (side dish) made by pickling vegetables. Unlike kimchi, jangajji is non-fermented vegetables, usually pickled in soy sauce, soybean paste, or chili paste. Jangajji dishes are usually preserved for a long period of time, and served with a drizzle of sesame oil. Preserved foods like jangajji were developed to attain a certain level of vegetable consumption during the long, harsh winters on the Korean Peninsula.

== Etymology ==
The word jangajji (장아찌) is derived from (Middle Korean: 쟈ᇰ앳디히, romanized: ccyangaistihi). (Note: See Yale romanization of Korean) The Middle Korean is believed to have come from Chinese: 酱瓜; pinyin: jiàngguā, 'pickled cucumber, melon or gourd'. The suffix -찌 (cci) may originate from Chinese: 漬; pinyin: zì 'to marinate or soak something'. Alternatively, the ending -찌 (cci) may represent the natural mutation of -ㅅ디히 (-stihi) to -ㅅ지이 (sci'i), finally becoming -찌 (cci).

== Ingredients ==
Main ingredients vary according to region and temperature. Some examples are green garlic, garlic scapes, radish, cucumber, chili pepper leaves, chamoe, perilla leaves, and deodeok. Jangajji is usually pickled in soy sauce, soybean paste, or chili paste, but brine and diluted vinegar can also be used as the pickling liquid. Usually, vegetables are slightly dried or salted to prevent the addition of surplus moisture to the condiment. When served, jangajji is cut, then seasoned with sesame oil, sugar, and toasted sesame seed powder.

== Varieties ==
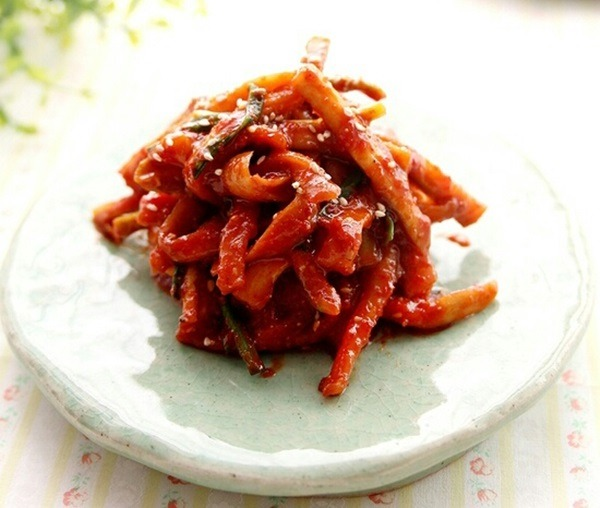
Seasoned and dried Korean radish)

- boksa-jangajji (복사장아찌) – pickled peach
- buchu-jangajji (부추장아찌) – pickled garlic chives
- chamoe-jangajji (참외장아찌) – pickled Korean melon
- cheoncho-jangajji (천초장아찌) – pickled chopi fruits
- doraji-jangajji (도라지장아찌) – pickled balloon flower roots
- gaji-jangajji (가지장아찌) – pickled eggplants
- kkaennip-jangajji (깻잎장아찌) – pickled perilla leaves
- maneul-jong-jangajji (마늘장아찌) – pickled garlic, both scapes and cloves
- meowi-jangajji (머위장아찌) – pickled butterbur leaves
- mu-jangajji (무장아찌) – pickled Korean radish (무 mu)
- mu-mallaengi-jangajji (무말랭이장아찌) – pickled dried Korean radish
- oi-jangajji (오이장아찌) – pickled cucumber
- pa-jangajji (파장아찌) – pickled scallions
- put-gochu-jangajji (풋고추장아찌) – pickled green chili peppers
- put-maneul-jangajji (풋마늘장아찌) – pickled green garlic
- saenggang-jangajji (생강장아찌) – pickled ginger
- sancho-jangajji (산초장아찌) – pickled prickly ash fruits
- umu-jangajji (우무장아찌) – pickled agar jelly
- yeolmu-jangajji (열무장아찌) – pickled young yeolmu (summer radish)

== Gallery ==
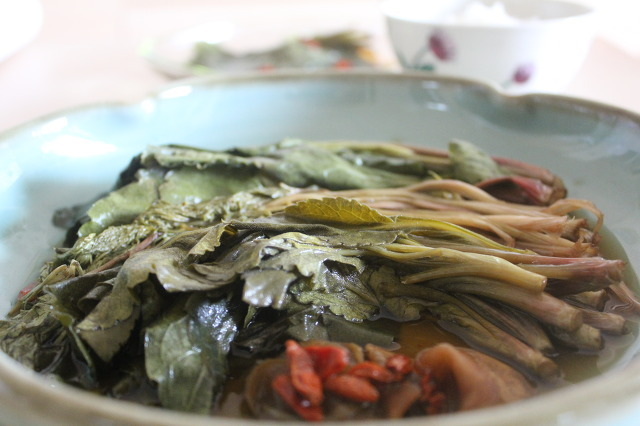
Bom-namul-jangajji (pickled spring herbs)

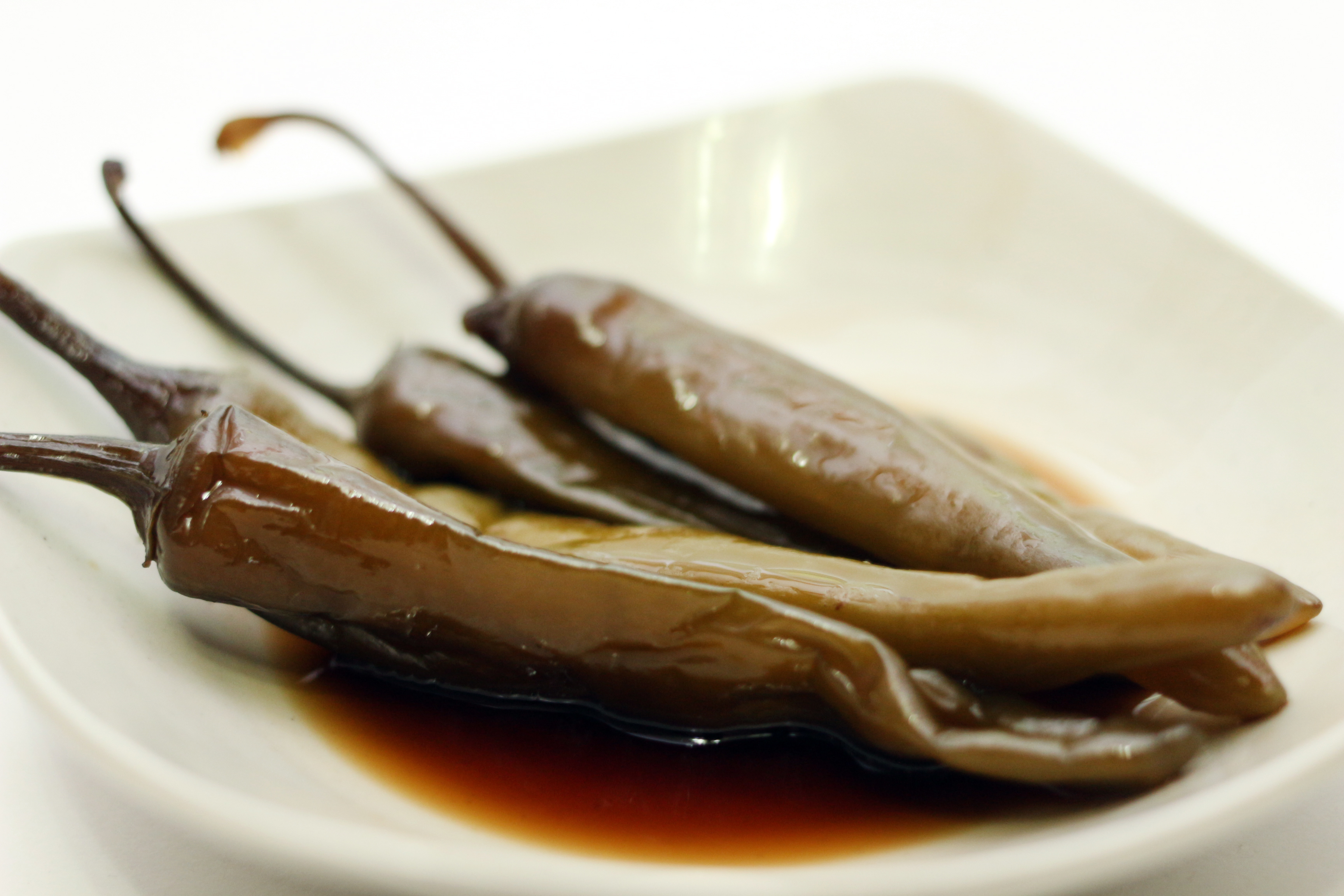
Gochu-jangajji (pickled chili peppers)

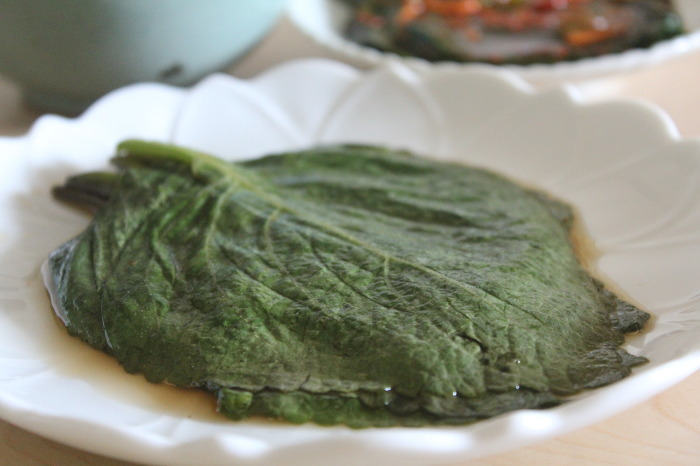
Kkaennip-jangajji (pickled perilla leaves)

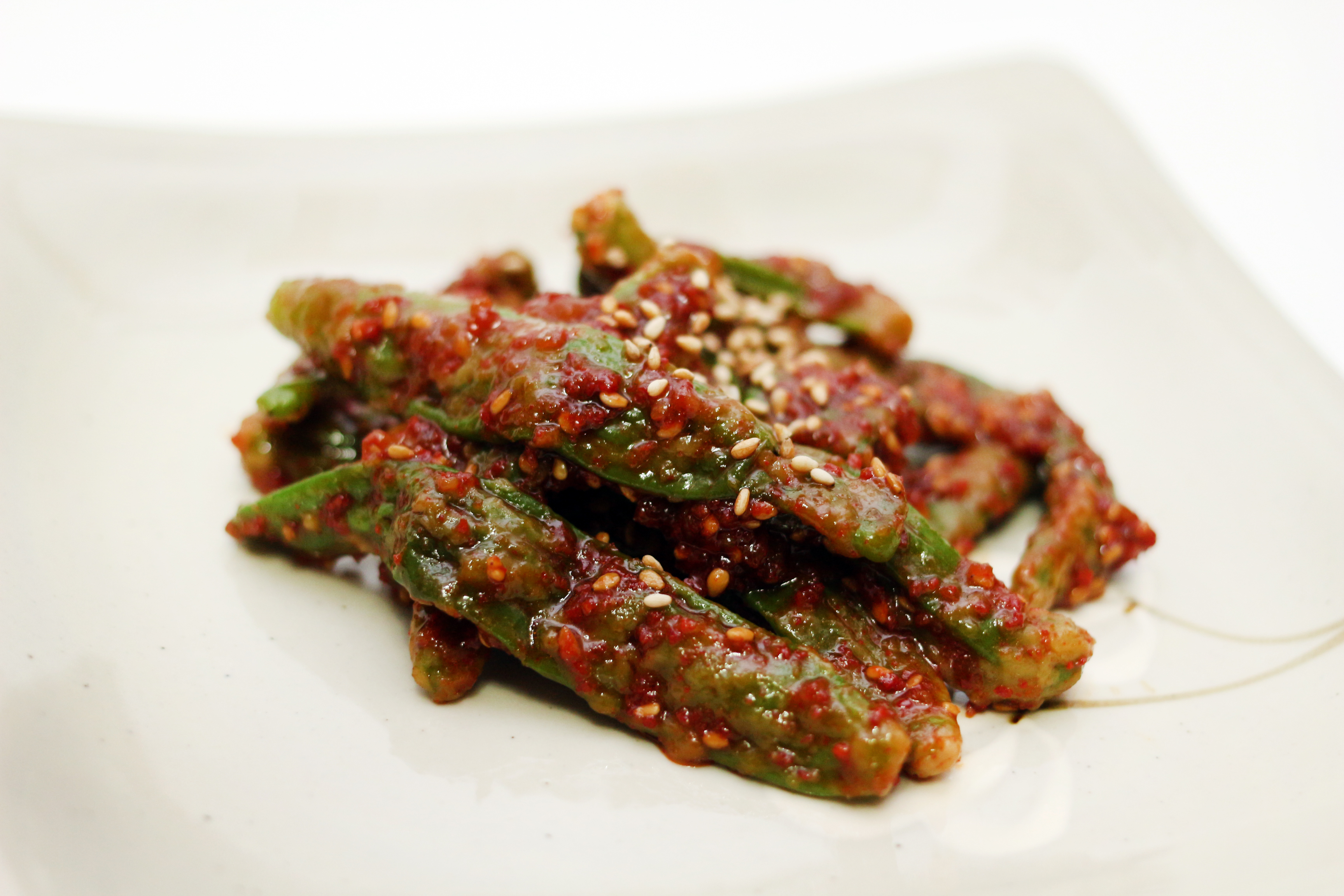
Kkwari-gochu-jangajji (pickled shishito)

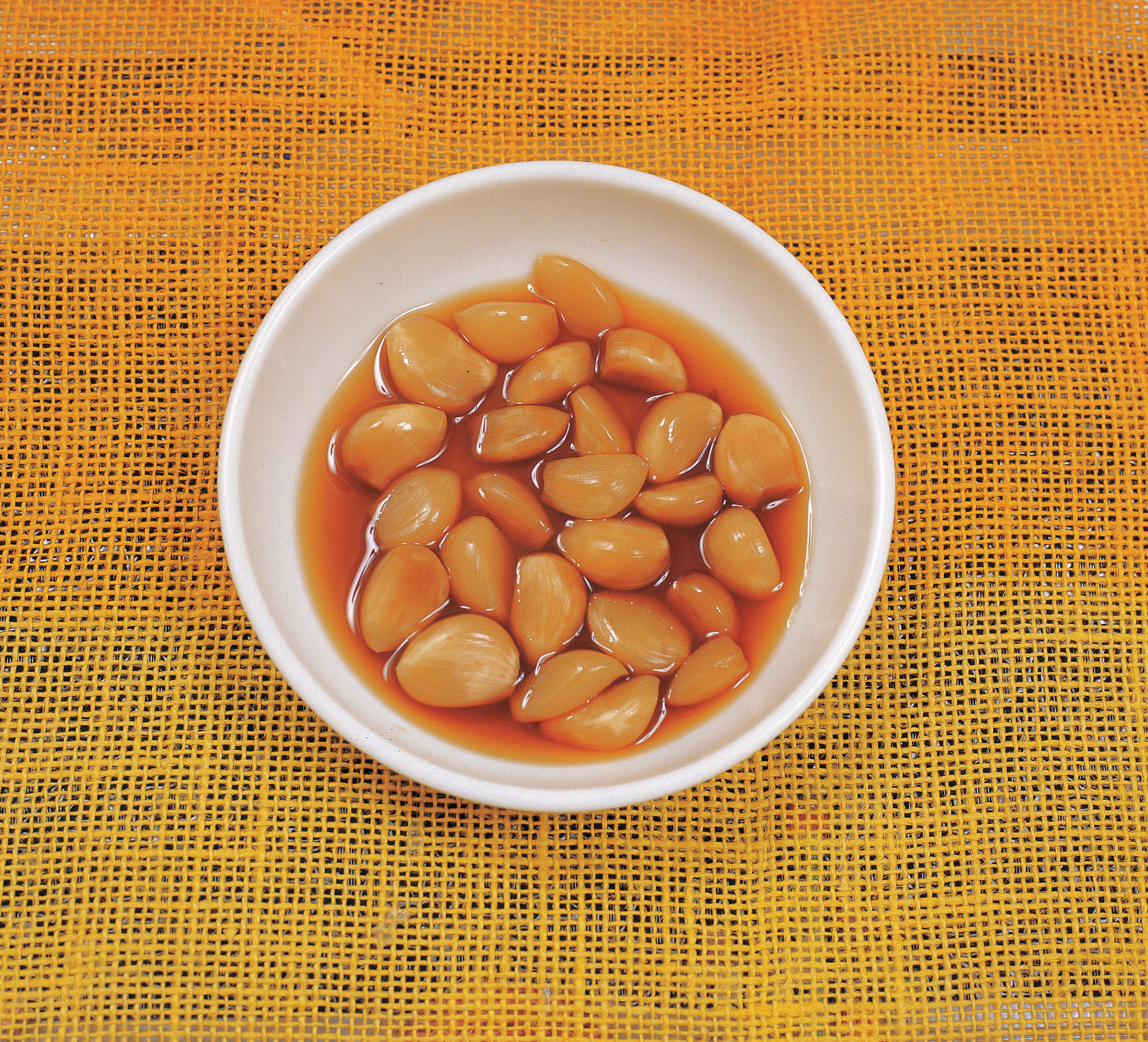
Maneul-jangajji (pickled garlic)

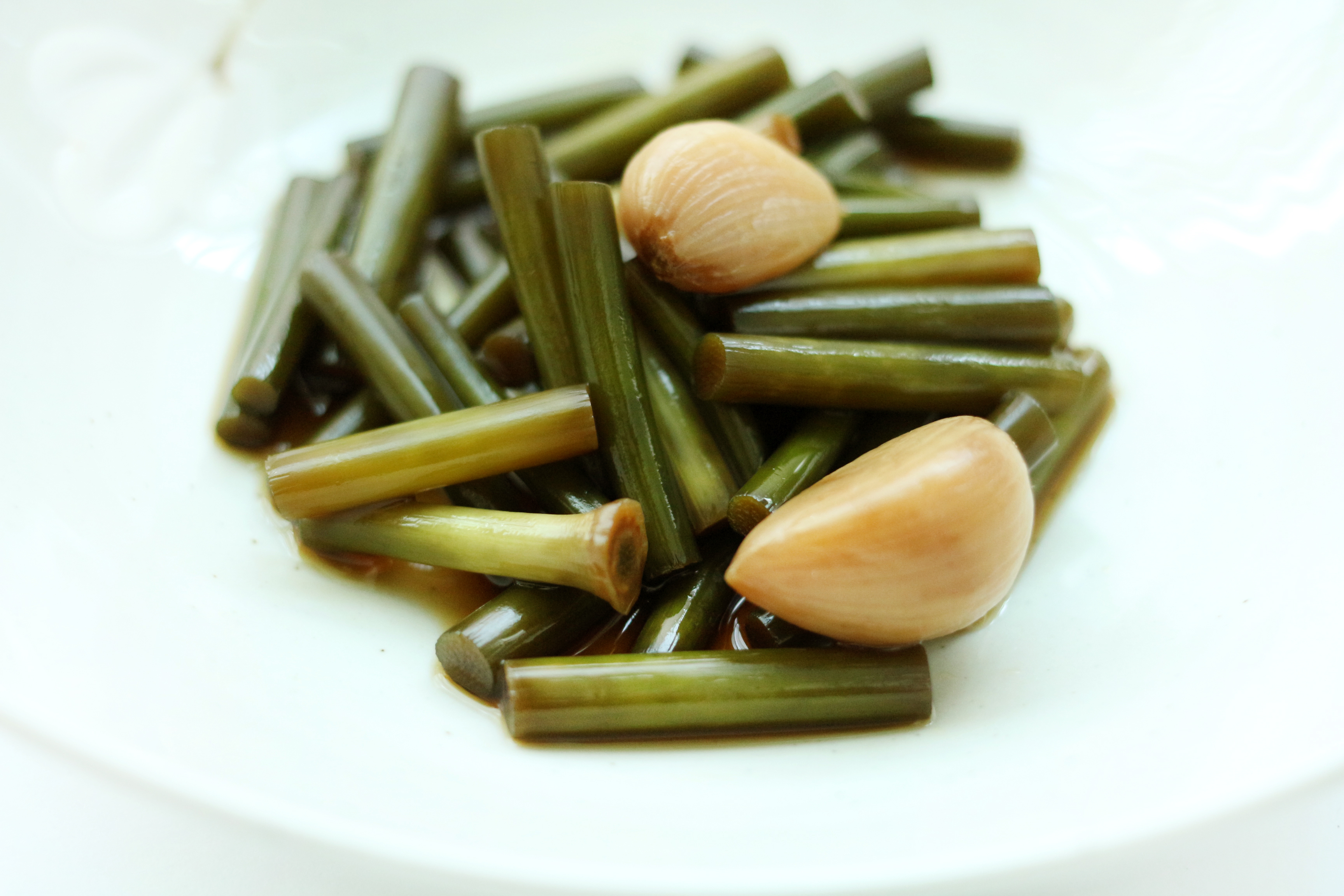
Maneul-jong-jangajji (pickled garlic scapes)

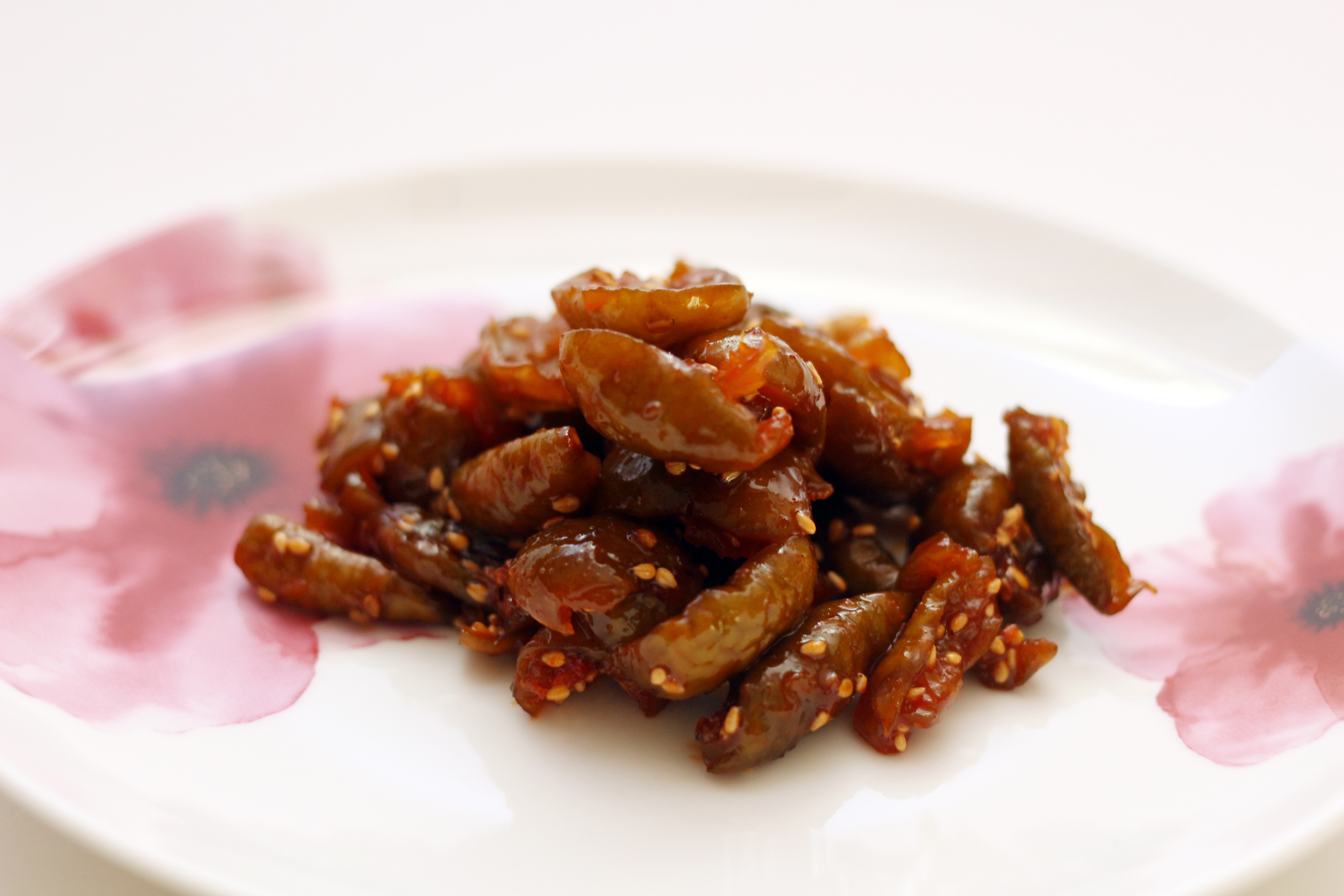
Maesil-jangajji (pickled Chinese plums)

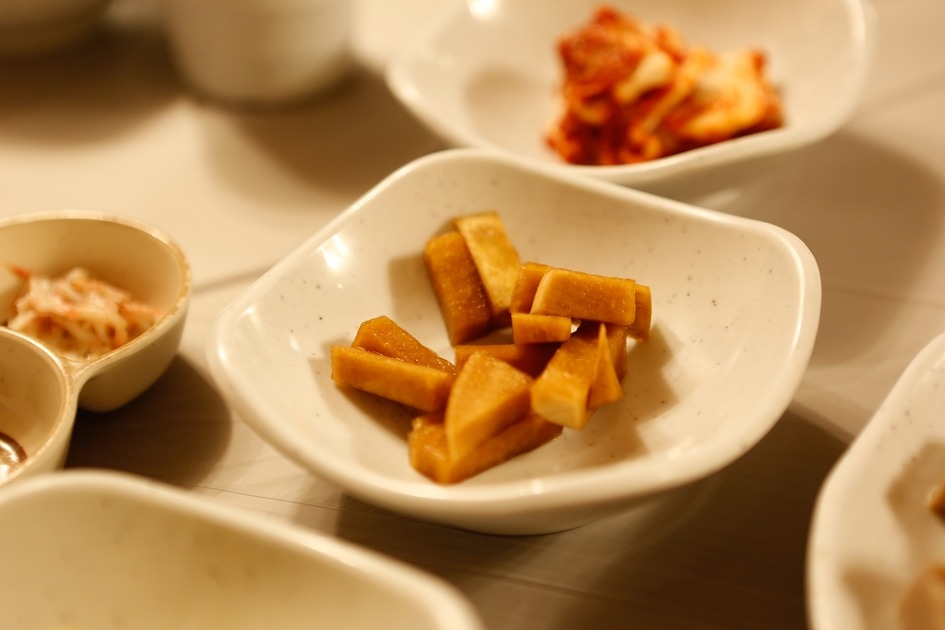
Mu-jangajji (pickled Korean radish)

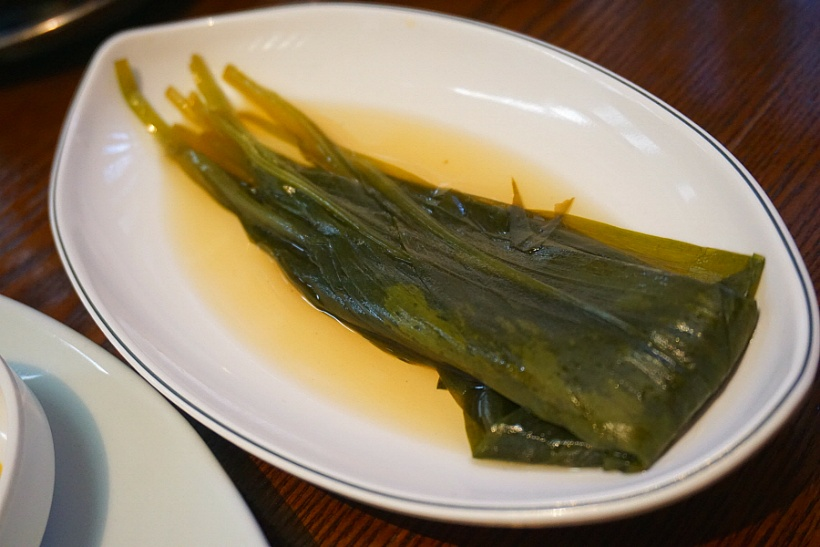
Myeongi-jangajji (pickled Siberian onion leaves)

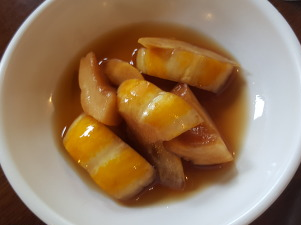
Chamoe-jangajji (pickled Korean melon)

== See also ==
- Giardiniera – Italian relish of pickled vegetables in vinegar or oil
- Pào cài – Pickle in Chinese cuisine
- Tsukemono – Japanese preserved vegetables
- Torshi – Procedure of preserving food in brine or vinegar
- List of pickled foods
