= Korean radish =

Variety of edible white radish

Mu Korean radish
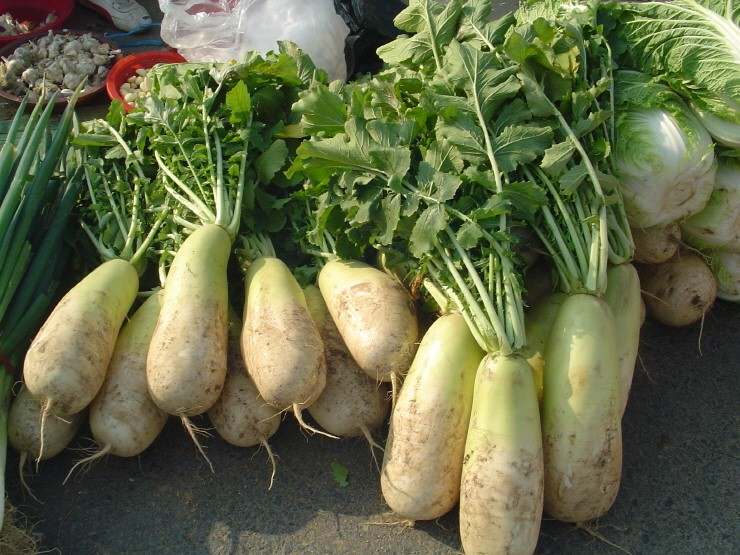
- Genus: Raphanus
- Species: R. raphanistrum
- Subspecies: R. raphanistrum subsp. sativus
- Cultivar group: White radish
- Cultivar: Mu / Korean radish
- Origin: Korea

Korean name
- Hangul: 무
- RR: mu
- MR: mu
- IPA: [muː]

Mu (Korean: 무) or Korean radish is a variety of white radish with a firm crunchy texture.

Although mu is also a generic term for radishes in Korean, the word is usually used in its narrow sense, referring to the white radish, or more specifically Korean radish (조선무, Joseon-mu). Korean radishes are generally short, stout, and sturdy, and have a pale green shade halfway down from the top. They also have a strong flavour, dense flesh and soft leaves. The greens of Korean radishes are called mucheong (무청) and are used as a vegetable in various dishes.

== Description ==
Korean radishes, like other radishes, are an annual or biennial crop grown for the taproots. The rotund cylindrical roots weigh about 800 grams (28 oz), being approximately 20 centimetres (7.9 in) long with their diameter around 7–8 centimetres (2.8–3.1 in). The flesh of Korean radishes harvested timely is crisp, peppery and sweet.

The upper part of the roots are subterranean stems, from which the long ovate leaves grow. The pinnate leaves with enlarged terminal lobe and smaller lateral lobes are arranged in a rosette. The white to light purple flowers are borne on a racemose inflorescence from April to May. Petals are twice as long as the calyx lobes, which are around 7 millimetres (0.28 in). There is a pistillum and tetradynamous stamen. The fruits are small pods around 4–6 centimetres (1.6–2.4 in), with hard shells and reddish-brown seeds.

== Cultivation ==
Cultivation of radishes in Korea started in the Three Kingdoms era, and the crop was considered one of the most important in the Goryeo era. In 2015, radish is the most widely cultivated crop in South Korea, with a cultivation area of 70,000 hectares (170,000 acres) and an annual yield of 4.5 million tons. Korean radishes take about 3 months to grow. If properly cellar-stored in the unfrozen ground, the radishes harvested in autumn can be preserved until the spring.

== Culinary use ==
Every part of the plant is used, from the taproot to the greens. It is an essential ingredient in soups, stews, and also for making a base broth for various dishes.

Ingredients

- mucheong – radish greens, dried to make siraegi or used fresh in cooking
- mu-mallaengi – dried radish, prepared by julienning radishes and sun-drying them
- musun – radish sprout, grown from radish seeds
- siraegi – dried radish greens or dried leaves of napa cabbages
- ssammu – paper-thin radish pickled in vinegar, salt, and sugar. It is one of the ssam vegetables commonly used to wrap samgyeopsal or galbi.
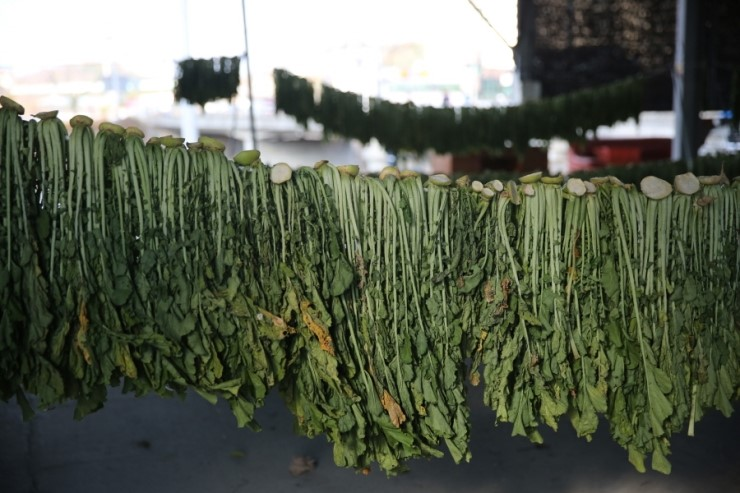
Drying mucheong (radish greens) to make siraegi

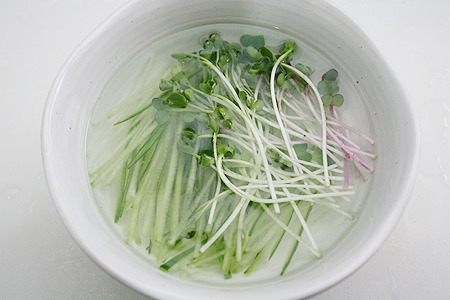
Soaking musun (radish sprouts) in water

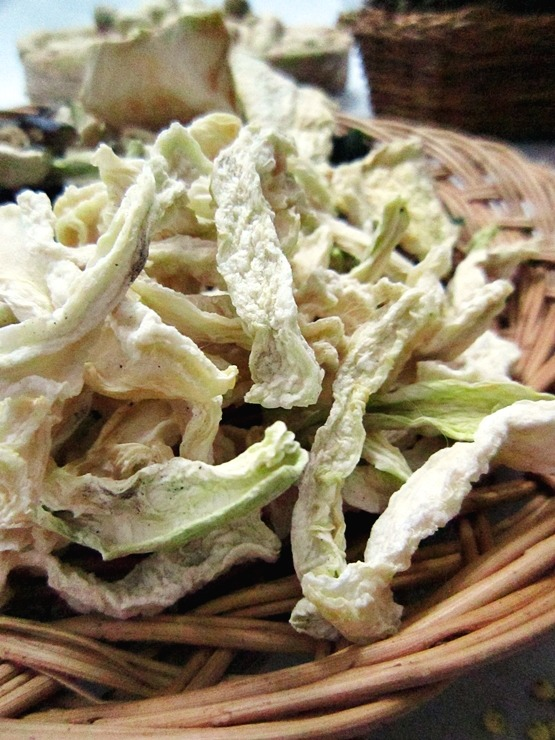
Mu-mallaengi (dried radish)

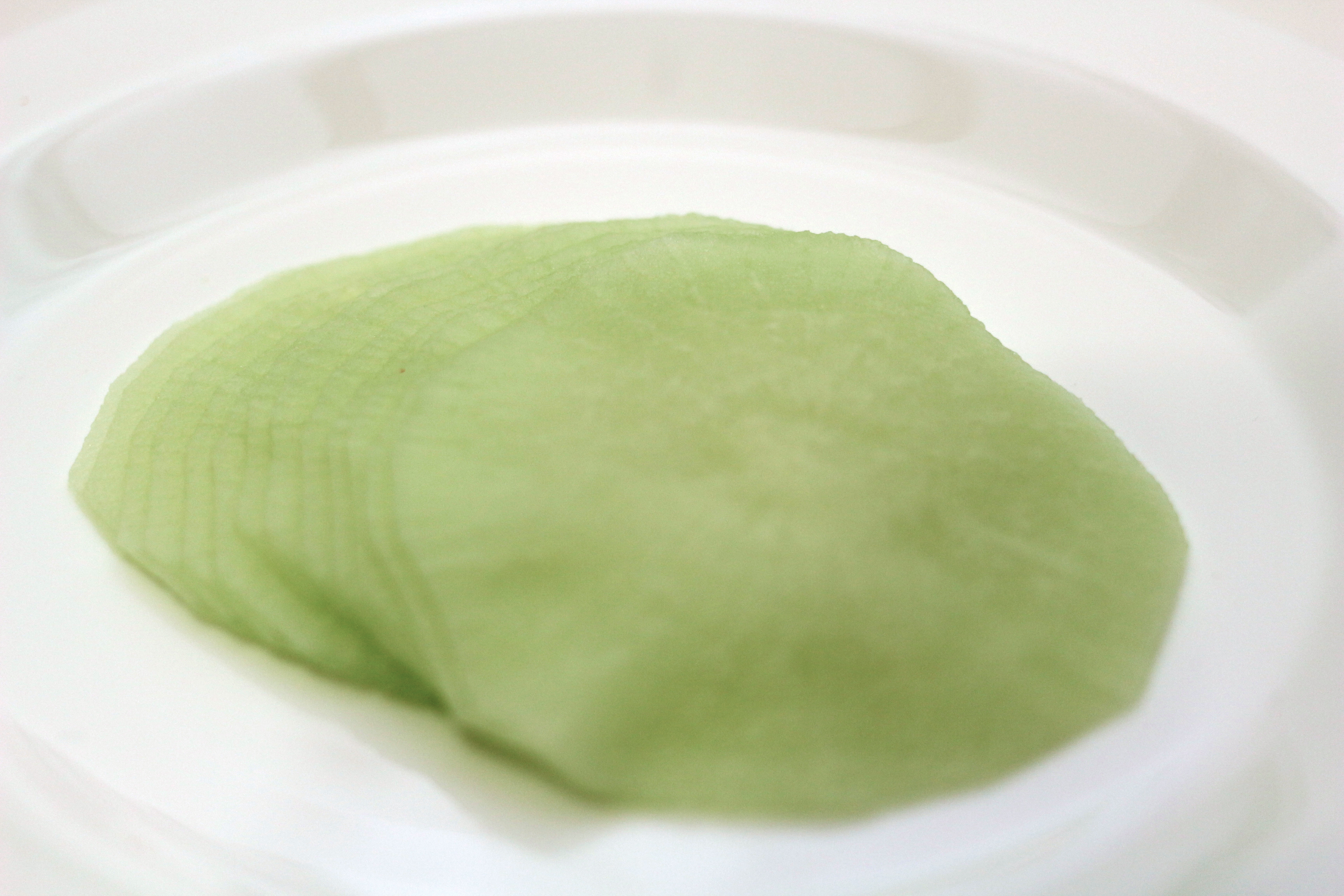
Ssammu (pickled radish paper for ssam)

Dishes

- dongchimi – a type of water kimchi, made by pouring boiled and then cooled water to sliced and salted radishes, pickled chili, and the ingredients that are put in a cheesecloth bag: apples, pears, garlics, gingers, chili seeds, scallions, and mustard greens.
- kkakdugi – a type of kimchi, made by marinating cubed and salted radishes with pureed mixture of red chili, scallions, pear, and onion, fish sauce, chili powder, plum syrup, and salt. Chopped scallions are usually sprinkled on top.
- mubap – a type of bap (staple), made of rice and sliced radishes. It is usually served with seasoned soy sauce.
- muguk – a type of guk (soup), made with slices of beef and radish, stir-fried in sesame oil, then cooked with water and soup soy sauce, and seasoned with salt and a dash of black pepper.
- mu-jangajji – a type of jangajji (pickle), made by pan-frying mu-mallaengi (julienned and dried radish) soaked in soy sauce.
- mu-mallaengi-muchim – a type of namul (seasoned vegetable dish), made by mixing soaked mu-mallaengi with pureed mixture of onions and red chili peppers, then adding soy sauce, soup soy sauce, minced garlic and ginger, chili powder, plum syrup, sugar, and toasted sesame seeds.
- mu-namul – a type of namul made by stir-frying julienned and lightly salted radish in sesame oil, then adding chopped scallions, minced garlic, and toasted sesame seeds.
- mu-saengchae – a type of namul made by seasoning julienned radishes with chili powder, fish sauce, salt, plum syrup, minced garlic, chopped scallions, and toasted sesame seeds.
- mu-sirutteok – a type of tteok (rice cake), more specifically a variety of siru-tteok (steamed rice cake), made by made mixing rice flour with julienned radishes, putting steamed and pounded red beans on top, and steaming them in a siru (earthenware steamer).
- mussam – a type of roll or wrap, made by wrapping shredded vegetables in ssammu (pickled radish paper).
- nabak-kimchi – a type of water kimchi, made by pouring cooled chili powder-water on radishes and napa cabbages which are both cut into thin square slices and salted, and adding sliced scallions, thinly sliced garlic and ginger, and deseeded and thinly julienned red chili peppers. Chili powder-water can be made by putting chili powder in a cheesecloth bag, and massaging the bag in a water seasoned with salt and sugar. Nabakk-imchi is usually served with chopped waterdropwort and toasted pine nuts.
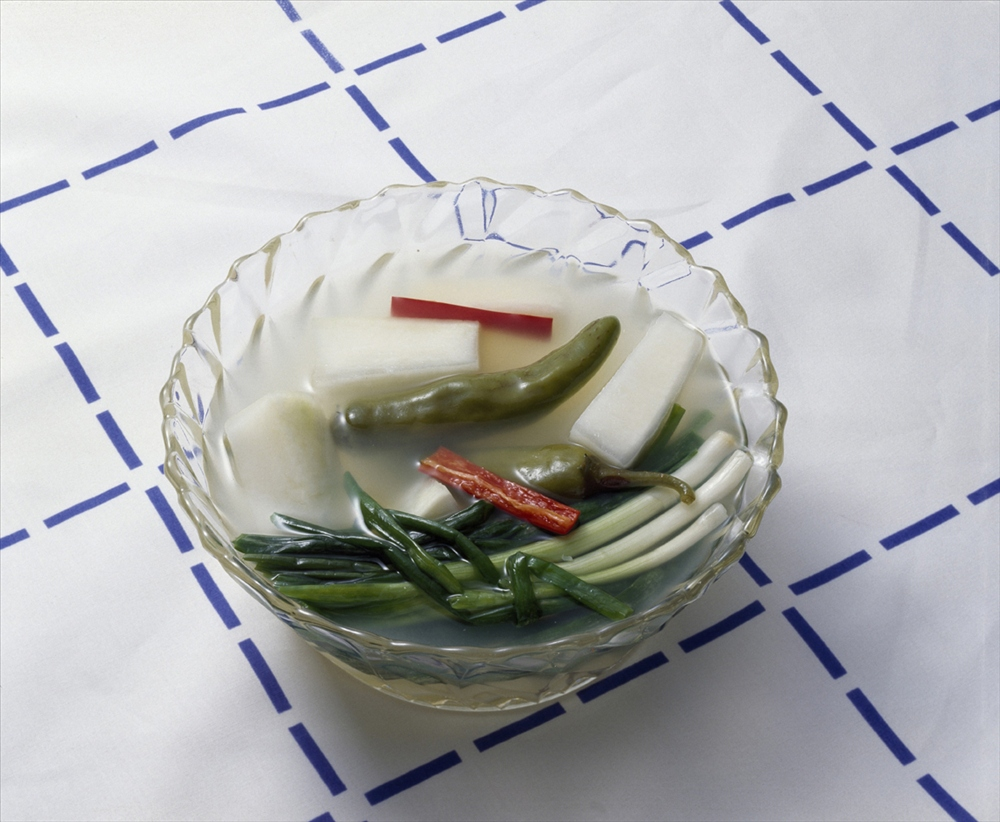
Dongchimi (radish water kimchi)

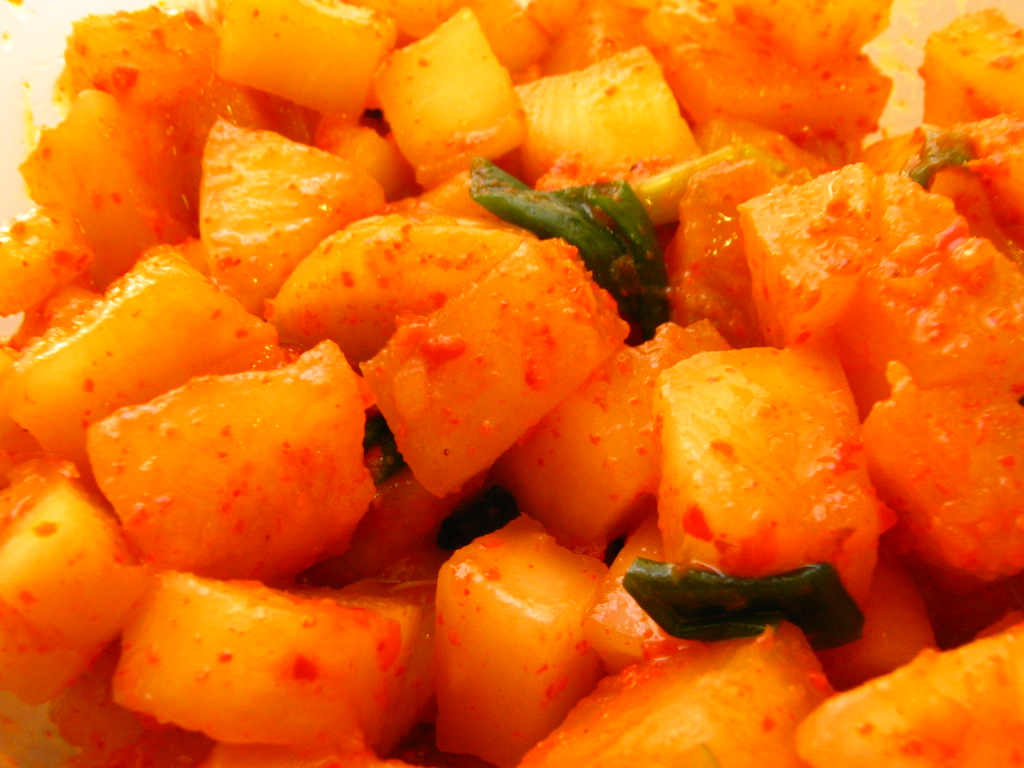
Kkakdugi (radish kimchi)

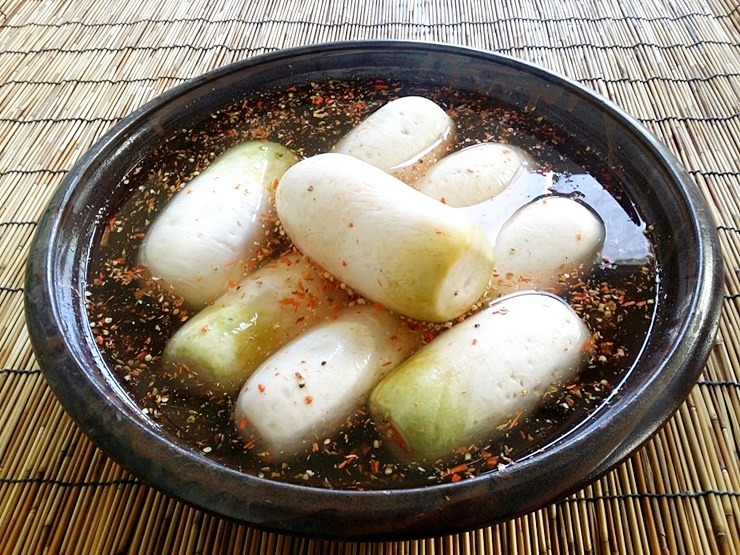
Mu-jjanji (salted radish pickle)

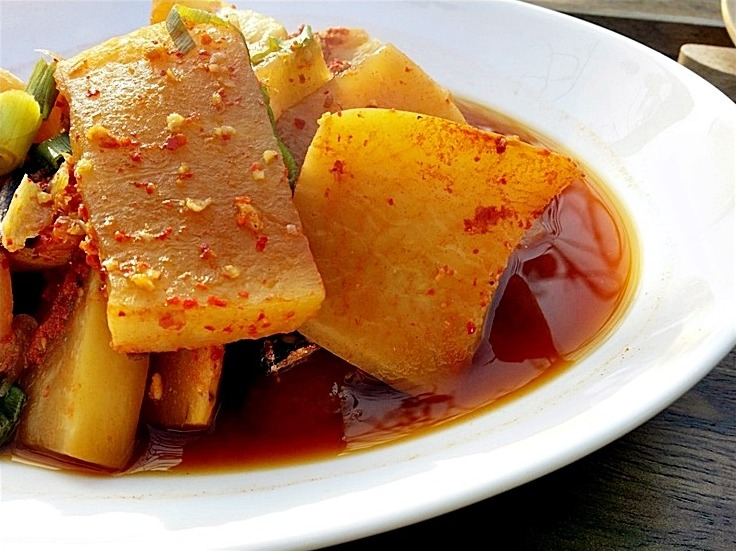
Mu-jorim (braised radish)

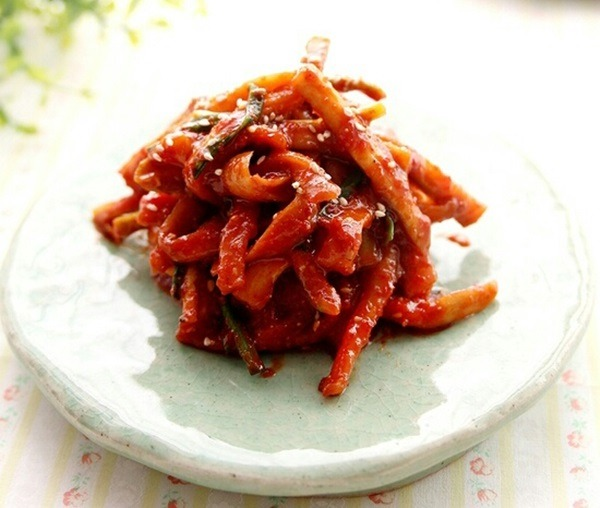
Mu-mallaengi-muchim (seasoned dried radish)

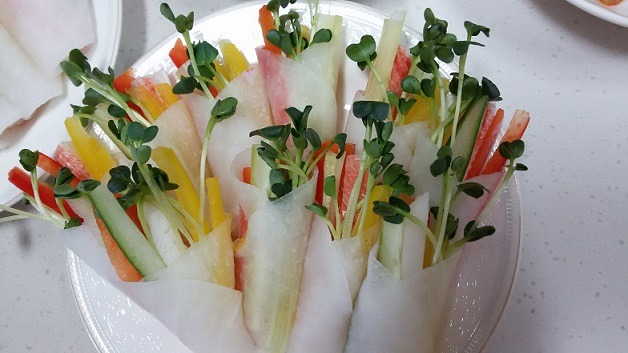
Mussam (radish wraps)

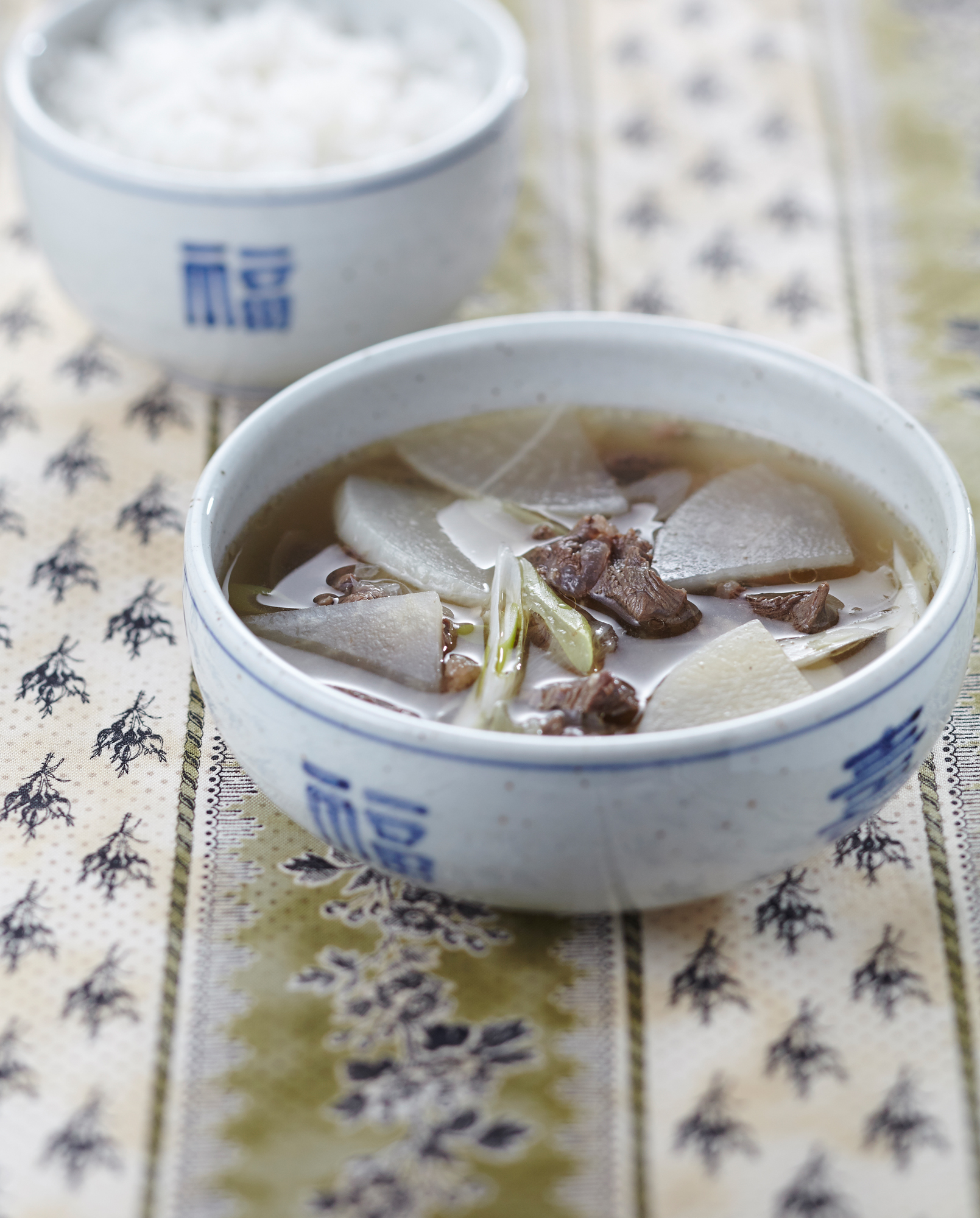
Soegogi-mu-guk (beef radish soup) with rice

== See also ==
- Chonggak radish
- Gegeol radish
- Yeolmu
