= Yeolmu =

Leafy radish cultivated in Korea

Yeolmu Young summer radish
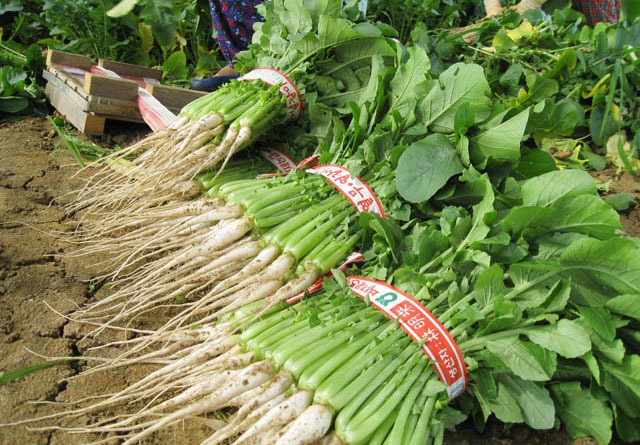
- Young summer radishes sold in bunches
- Genus: Raphanus
- Species: R. raphanistrum
- Subspecies: R. raphanistrum subsp. sativus
- Cultivar group: White radish
- Cultivar: Yeolmu (young summer radish)
- Origin: Korea

Korean name
- Hangul: 열무
- RR: yeolmu
- MR: yŏlmu
- IPA: [jʌl.mu]

Yeolmu (Korean: 열무) or young summer radish is a type of leafy radish cultivated in Korea. Its taproots and greens are harvested when they are still soft and tender.

== Overview ==
Yeolmu is derived from yeorin mu (여린 무), meaning young radish. It was originally cultivated as a summer intercrop, but in modern times it is cultivated intensively in the suburbs of cities, being available for harvest several times a year: about 60 days in winter, 40 days in spring, and 25 days in summer.

Its leaves are alkaline in nature, low in calories, while being rich in fiber, Vitamin A and C. Young, small and thin yeolmu are recommended over aged ones, which are thicker. Because its leaves wilt quickly, yeolmu should be eaten as soon as possible, and any leftovers are to be refrigerated. The leaves can be eaten raw or added to different dishes, such as yeolmu-kimchi, yeolmu-nangmyeon, and bibimbap.

Different areas cultivate different varieties of yeolmu. In Gangwon Province, the Japanese variety Gungjungmu (궁중무) is mainly cultivated, while the cultivars in Gyeongsang Province are tougher and have deeply dented leaf edges, and for Jeolla Province they are flat and soft.

Since the 1960s, yeolmu began to be mass produced in the fertile Ilsan area of Goyang city, and it became a representative product from the region. In 2024, it is registered as Geographical Indication No. 115 in South Korea.

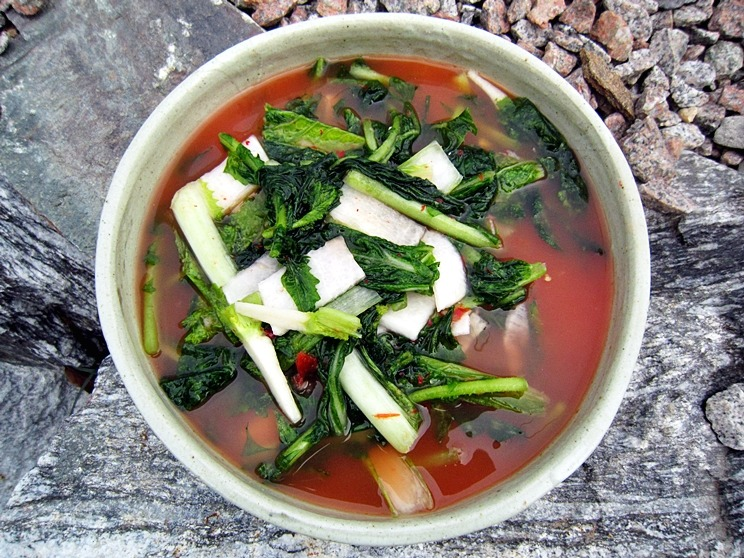
Yeolmu-kimchi (Young summer radish kimchi)

== See also ==
- Korean radish
- Chonggak radish
- Gegeol radish
