= Dongchimi =

Short-maturing Korean vegetable pickle

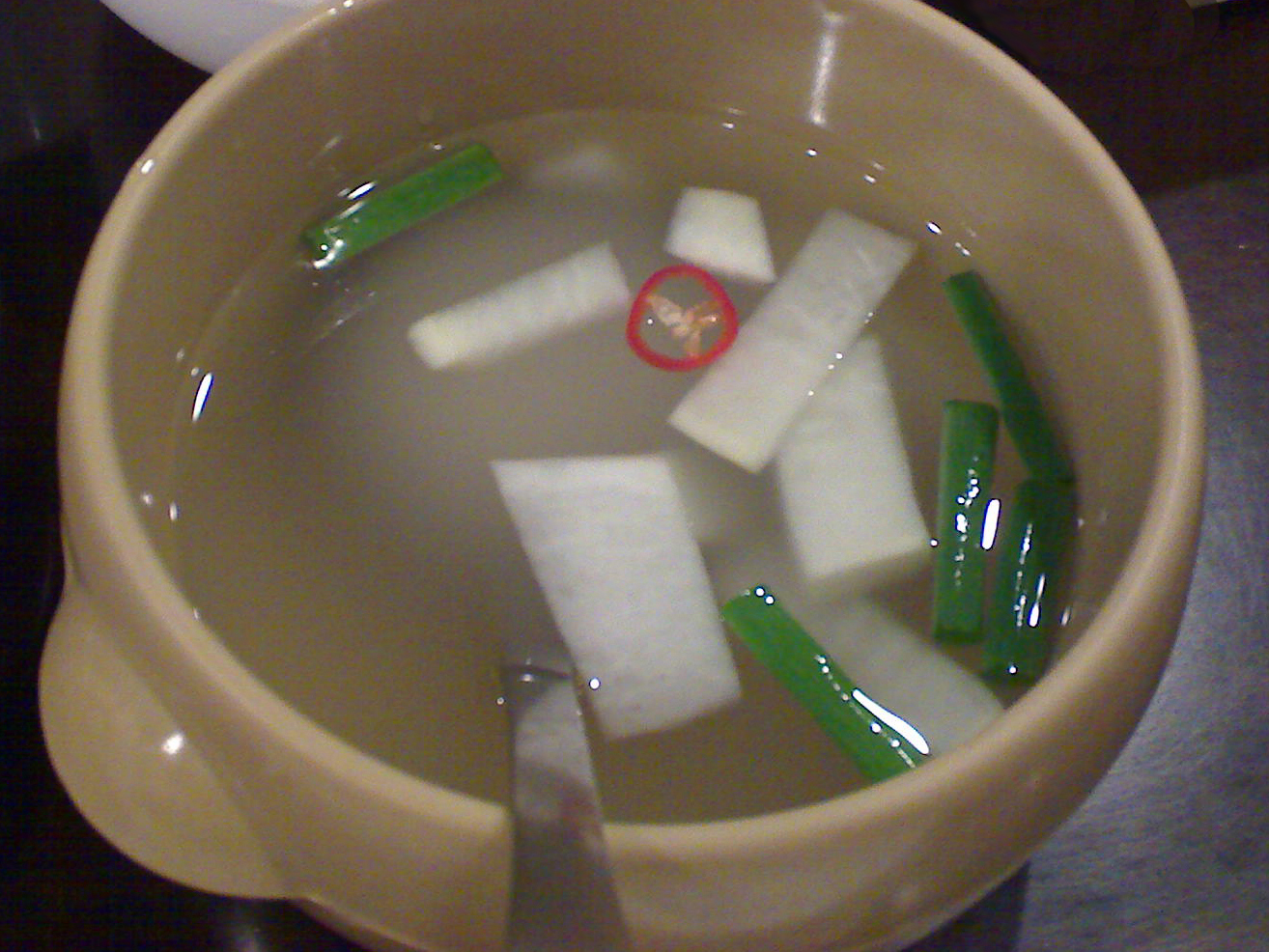
- Dongchimi served as banchan
- Type: Kimchi
- Place of origin: Korea
- Serving temperature: Cold
- Main ingredients: Korean radish, napa cabbage, scallions, green chilli, ginger, pear

Korean name
- Hangul: 동치미
- Hanja: 冬치미
- RR: dongchimi
- MR: tongch'imi

Dongchimi (Korean: 동치미) is a variety of kimchi in Korean cuisine consisting of Korean radish, napa cabbage, scallions, pickled green chilli, ginger, Korean pear and watery brine . As the name dong (동; 冬; lit. 'winter') and chimi (치미, an ancient term for "kimchi"), suggests, this kimchi is traditionally consumed during the winter season.

Dongchimi is fermented like other varieties of kimchi, but its maturing period is relatively short (2–3 days). Although it can be made at any time of the year, it is usually made during the gimjang season. The northern regions, particularly Hamgyong Province and Pyongan Province in North Korea, are particularly famous for their dongchimi. The clear and clean taste of the watery dongchimi is used as a soup for making dongchimi guksu (동치미국수 cold noodle soup made with dongchimi) and naengmyeon, or served with tteok or steamed sweet potatoes to balance out the rich flavors.

== Ingredients ==
Radish is the most important ingredient in dongchimi. Whole green or red peppers can be added as decoration but are not required. Leaf mustard, garlic, ginger and leeks, as well as other salted ingredients, may be included.

== Types ==
- Baechu dongchimi (배추동치미; lit. 'cabbage dongchimi')

Radish and napa cabbage stuffed with ingredients such as julienned radish, Korean chives, red peppers, garlic, and ginger is pickled in brine. Kelp stock is added for deep flavor before fermentation.

- Daenamu dongchimi (대나무동치미; lit. 'bamboo dongchimi')

Bamboo leaves are used as a main ingredient, giving the dongchimi a crisp and clean taste while adding texture. The fermentation process takes longer than other varieties of dongchimi due to its lower sodium content but it can also be stored much longer. It is a local specialty of South Jeolla province.

- Gungjung dongchimi (궁중 동치미; lit. 'royal dongchimi')

Made from small radishes, yuja, pomegranate, and Korean pears are added for a fragrant version.

There are many other variations depending on region and personal taste.
