= Albap =

Korean dish

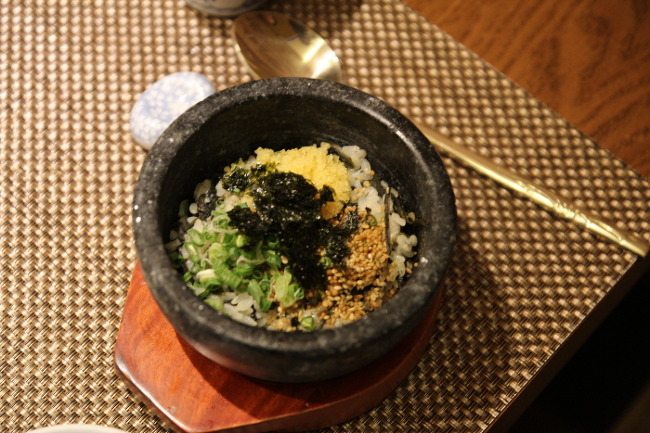
- Albap served in dolsot (stone pot)
- Type: Bibimbap
- Place of origin: Korea
- Associated cuisine: Korean cuisine
- Main ingredients: bap, roe, vegetables, kimchi, seaweed flakes.

Korean name
- Hangul: 알밥
- RR: albap
- MR: albap
- IPA: al.bap̚

Albap (Korean: 알밥; lit. 'roe rice') is a type of bibimbap made with one or more kinds of roe, most commonly flying fish (commonly Cheilopogon agoo) roe, and served in a sizzling hot ttukbaegi (earthenware) or dolsot (stone pot). It is a dish of Korean origin that is found in Japanese restaurants in South Korea, but not in Japan.

== Gallery ==
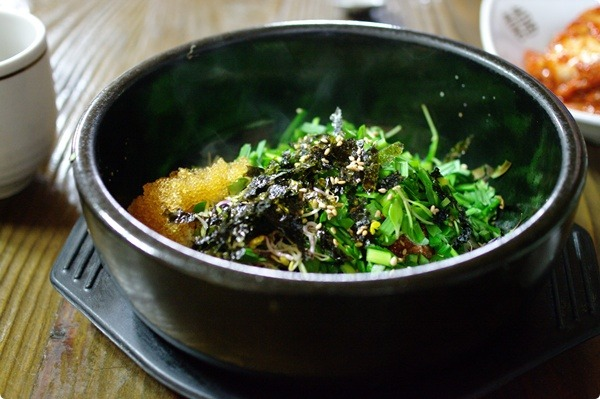
Albap served in ttukbaegi (earthenware)

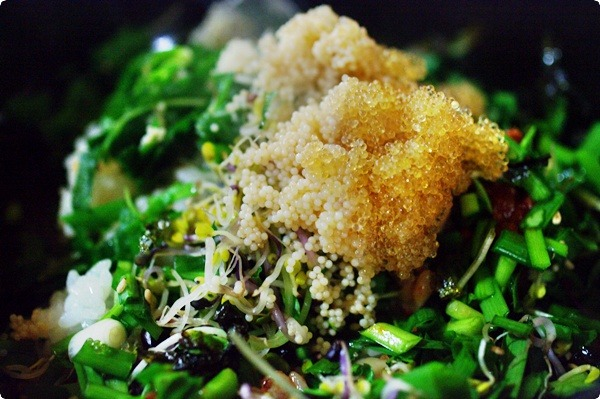
Albap (closeup, before mixed)

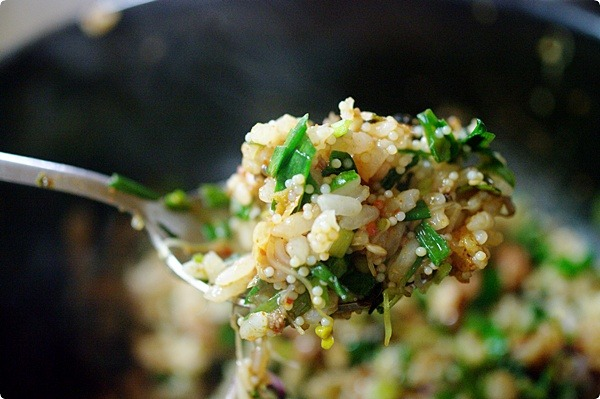
A spoonful of albap (closeup, mixed)

== See also ==
- Hoe-deopbap
