= Bibimbap =

Korean rice dish

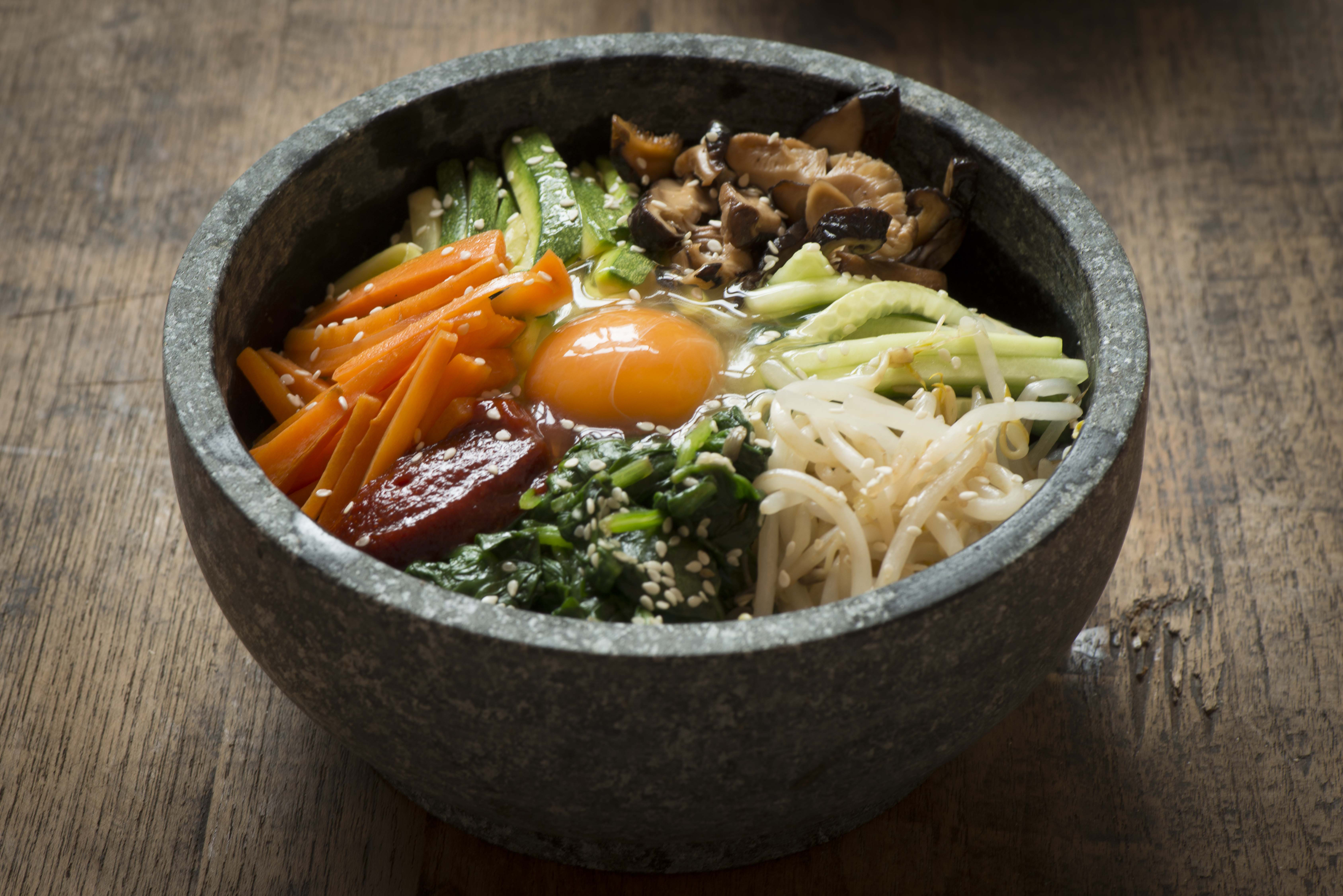
- Dolsot-bibimbap (hot stone pot bibimbap)
- Type: Bap
- Place of origin: Korea
- Region or state: East Asia
- Associated cuisine: Korean cuisine
- Variations: Dolsot-bibimbap, Jeonju-bibimbap, Jinju-bibimbap, Tongyeong-bibimbap

Korean name
- Hangul: 비빔밥
- RR: bibimbap
- MR: pibimpap
- IPA: pi.bim.p͈ap̚

Bibimbap (/ˈbiːbɪmbæp/ BEE-bim-bap; Korean: 비빔밥; lit. ''mixed rice''), sometimes romanised as bi bim bap or bi bim bop, is a Korean rice dish. It is served as a bowl of warm white rice topped with namul (sautéed or blanched seasoned vegetables) and gochujang (chili pepper paste). Egg and sliced meat (usually beef) are common additions, stirred together thoroughly just before eating. The term bibim means "mixing" and bap is cooked rice.

South Korean cities such as Jeonju, Jinju, and Tongyeong are known for their versions of bibimbap.

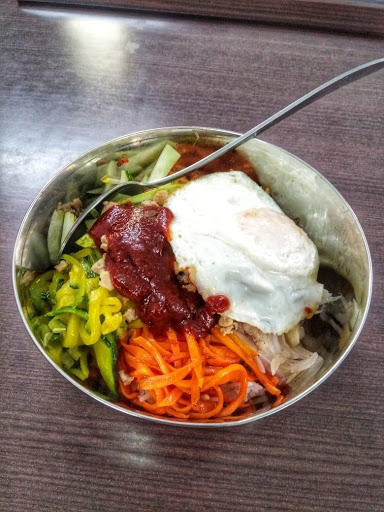
Homemade bibimbap with a fried egg

== Etymologies ==
The earliest names for bibimbap appear in Korean hanja texts. Its first name was hondon-ban (混沌飯). This name appeared in the Yeokjogumun (역조구문; 歷朝舊聞) portion of the book Historical Notes of Gijae (기재잡기; 寄齋雜記), which was written by Bak Dongnyang (박동량; 朴東亮) around 1590. In the Diary of Cheongdae by another Joseon scholar Gwon Sang-il (1679–1760), it was recorded as goldong-ban (骨董飯). The dish was also recorded in Complete Works of Seongho by Yi Ik (1681–1764) as goldong (骨董), in Complete Works of Cheongjanggwan by Yi Deok-mu (1741–1793) as goldong-ban (汩董飯), and in Works of Nakhasaeng by Yi Hak-gyu (1770–1835) as both goldong-ban (骨董飯) and goldong (骨董).

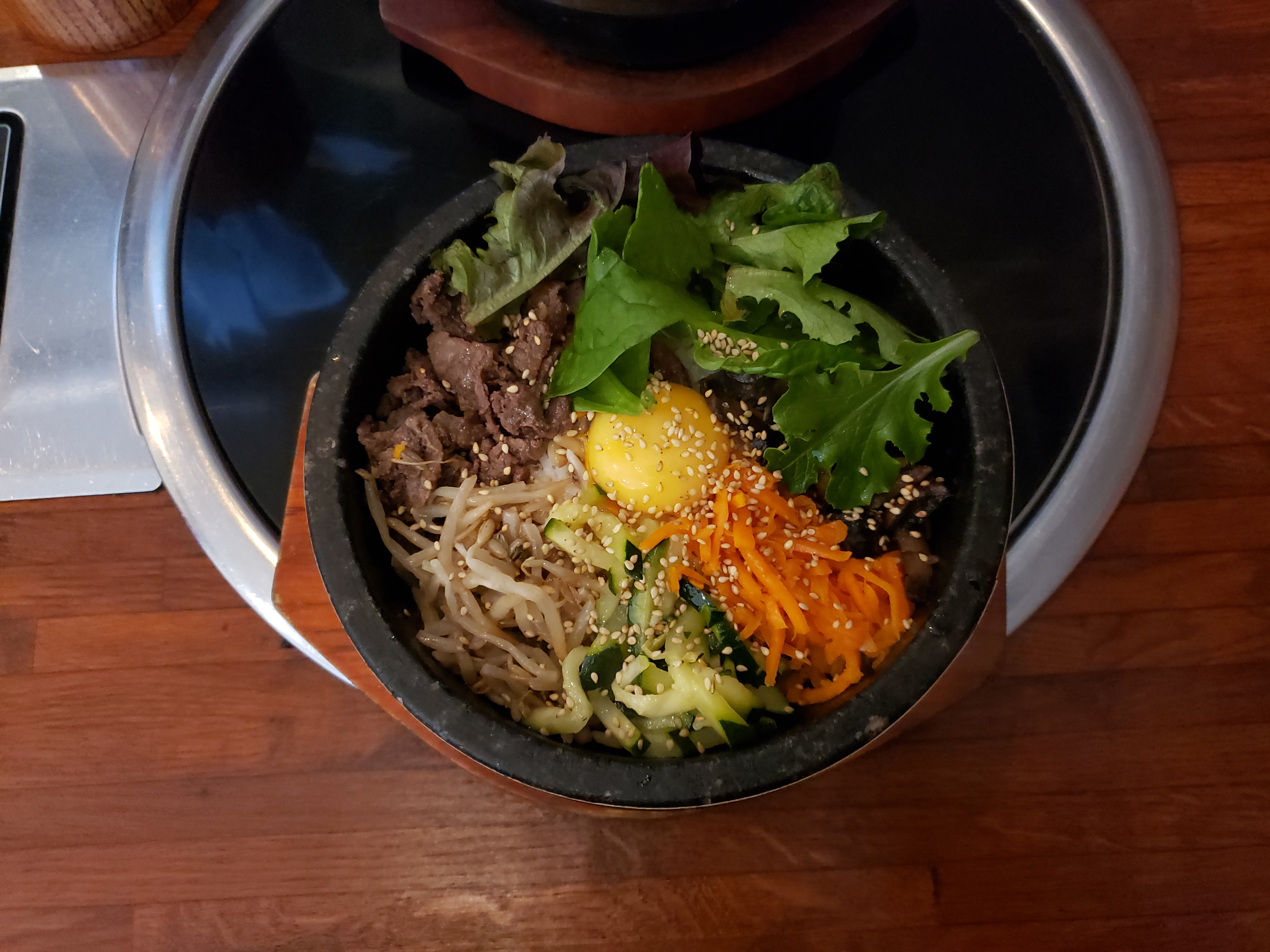
Bulgogi bibimbap

The hangul transcription beubwieum (브뷔음) first appears in the 1810 encyclopedia Mongyupyeon by Jang Hon. The 1870 encyclopedia Myeongmul giryak states that the dish name is written as goldong-ban (骨董飯) in hanja but is read as bubaeban (捊排飯), a probable transcription of the native Korean bubim-bap (부빔밥). Another name is beubwieumbap (브뷔음밥). The hanja dictionary (한대자전; 漢大字展) indeed contained "bubwida (부뷔다)" or "bubwium (부뷔움), Dong " (董) in hanja, which meant "mix" or "bibida" in Korean.

By the late 19th century, it went by a number of names in hangul: bubwiumbap (부뷔움밥), bubieumbap (부비음밥), bubwimbap (부뷤밥), bubuimbap (부븸밥), bubwinbap (부뷘밥), and bubimbap (부빔밥)bubaeban (捊排飯) and goldongban (骨董飯). Other names in hanja include goldongban (骨董飯, 汩董飯), hondonban (混沌飯), and bubaeban (捊排飯) and also banyuban (盤遊飯).

== History ==
The origin of bibimbap is unknown. Some scholars assert that bibimbap originates from the traditional practice of mixing all the food offerings made at a jesa (ancestral rite) in a bowl before partaking of it. People could have started mixing bap (rice) with banchan (side dishes) after the outdoor jesa (rites), such as sansinje (rite for mountain gods) or dongsinje (rite for village gods), where they needed to "eat with the god" but did not have as many cooking pots and items of crockery on hand as they would normally have at home.

There are two separate ancient writings that suggest the original reasoning behind the creation and use of bibimbap. The first one, "People's Unofficial Story of Jeonju" (全州野史), describes Jeonju bibimbap, an old-fashioned dish, as being used on occasions such as parties that included government officials of provincial offices. The second text, "Lannokgi" (蘭綠記), described bibimbap being made by the wives of farmers, who had no time to prepare meals the traditional way with many side dishes. They instead combined the ingredients in one bowl, sometimes adding whatever they happened to be cultivating. Although bibimbap was originally rarely mentioned and mostly only in hanja records, it began to be more frequently referenced and in Hangul (Korean alphabets) records as well upon the creation of Hangul by the King Sejong the Great to improve the state's literacy.

Bibimbap was served to the king, usually as a lunch or a between-meal snack. There were more than vegetables in this bibimbap.

Ordinary people ate bibimbap on the eve of the lunar new year. The people at that time felt that they had to get rid of all the leftover side dishes before the new year. The solution to this problem was to put all the leftovers in a bowl of rice and mix them together. Farmers ate bibimbap during farming season as it was the easiest way to make food for a large number of people. Bibimbap came from early rural Koreans taking leftover vegetables, sometimes having meat, with rice and mixing them in a bowl. This was cheap and did not require all of the time and space of a traditional meal.

The Collected Works of Oju written by Yi Gyu-gyeong (1788–1856), recorded numerous varieties of bibimbap including such ingredients as hoe, shad, prawn, salted shrimp, shrimp roe, gejang, wild chive, fresh cucumber, gim flakes, gochujang, soybean sprout, and various vegetables. It was also stated here that bibimbap was a local specialty of Pyongyang, along with naengmyeon and gamhongno.

The first known recipe for bibimbap is found in the Siuijeonseo, an anonymous cookbook from the late 19th century.

The division of Korea in the 20th century caused a cultural divide in the creation of bibimbap, with two types related to both North and South Korea. The most famous regions for traditional bibimbap happen to be Pyongyang for its vegetable bibimbap in the North and Jeonju for its Jeonju bibimbap.

The late 20th century brought about the globalisation of Korean culture, traditions, and food to many areas of the world, with many restaurant chains being opened up in various international airports that encourage the sale of bibimbap. Bibimbap started to become widespread in many countries in the West due to its simplicity, cheap cost, and delicious taste. Many airlines connecting to South Korea via Seoul and Busan began to serve it, and it was accepted more globally as a popular Korean dish. Bibimbap has also been described as a symbol of the Korean culture to non-Koreans due to Korea becoming more accessible to foreigners and multicultural traditions.

== Preparation ==
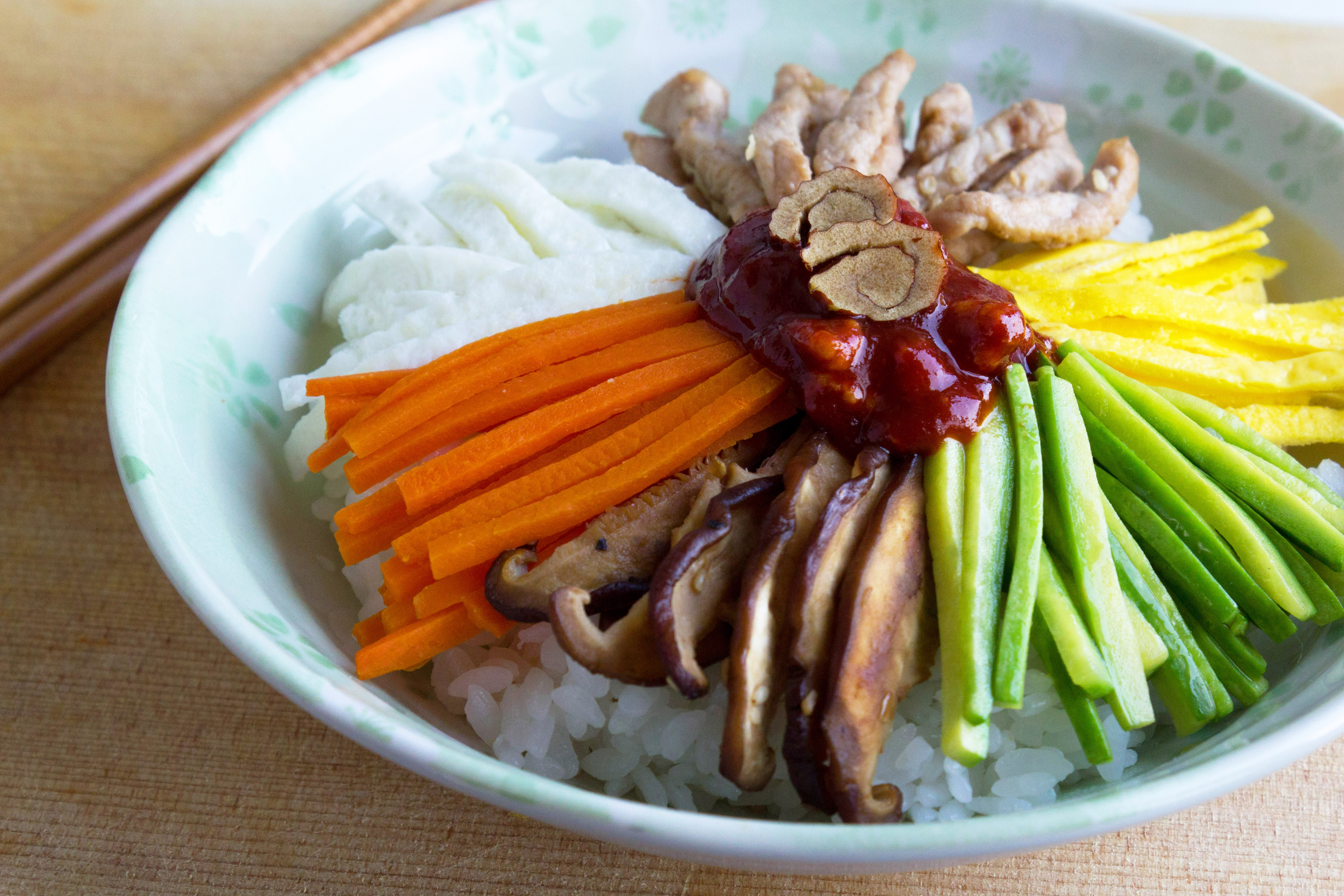
A bibimbap arranged to show all its components

Bibimbap uses various ingredients. Common vegetables include julienned oi (cucumber), aehobak (courgette/zucchini), mu (radish), mushrooms, doraji (bellflower root), gim (seaweed), spinach, soybean sprouts, and gosari (bracken fern stems). Dubu (tofu), either plain or sautéed, or a leaf of lettuce may be added, or chicken or seafood may be substituted for beef. For visual appeal, the vegetables are often placed so adjacent colors complement each other. In the South Korean version, sesame oil, red pepper paste (gochujang), and sesame seeds are added.

== Variations ==
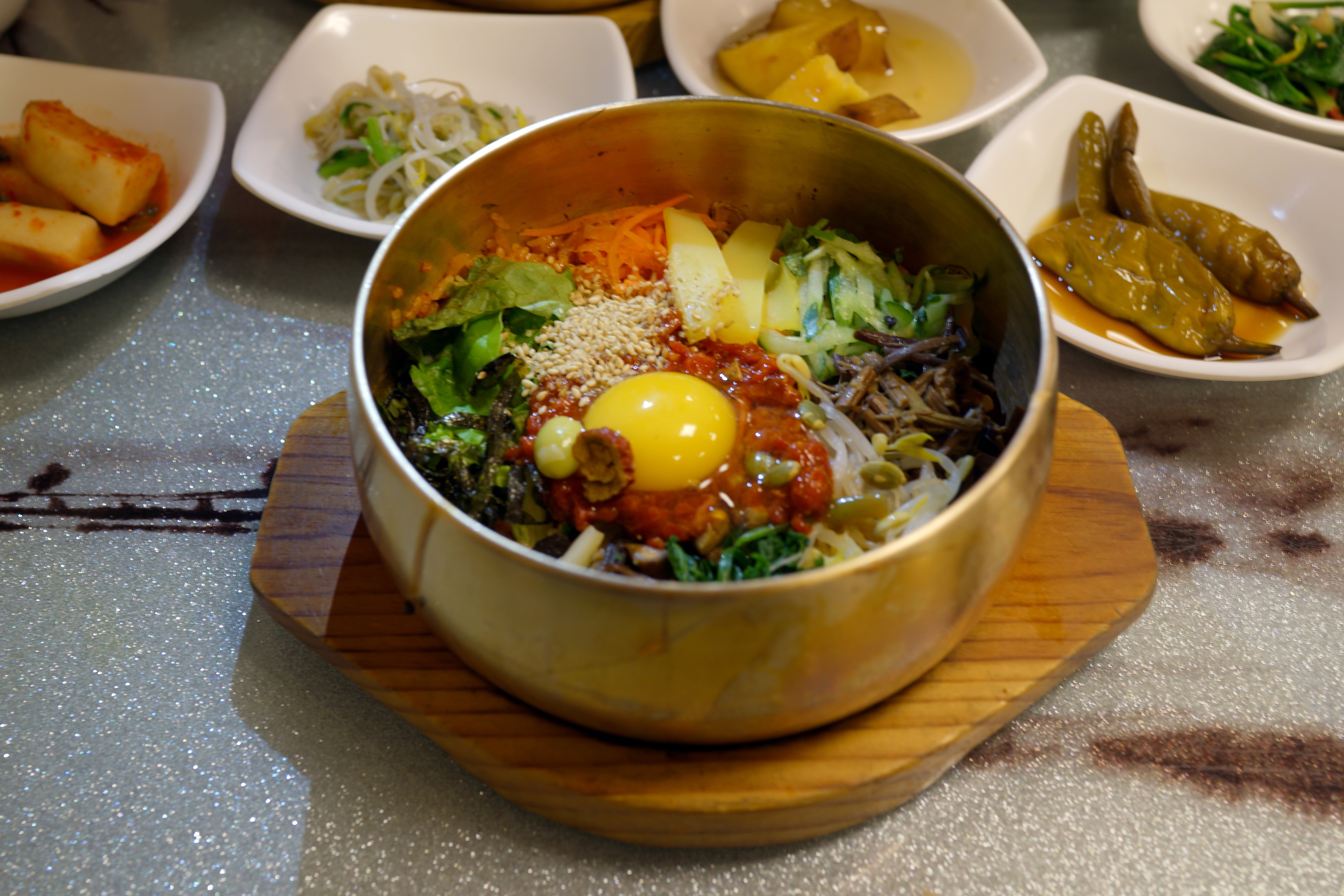
Jeonju bibimbap

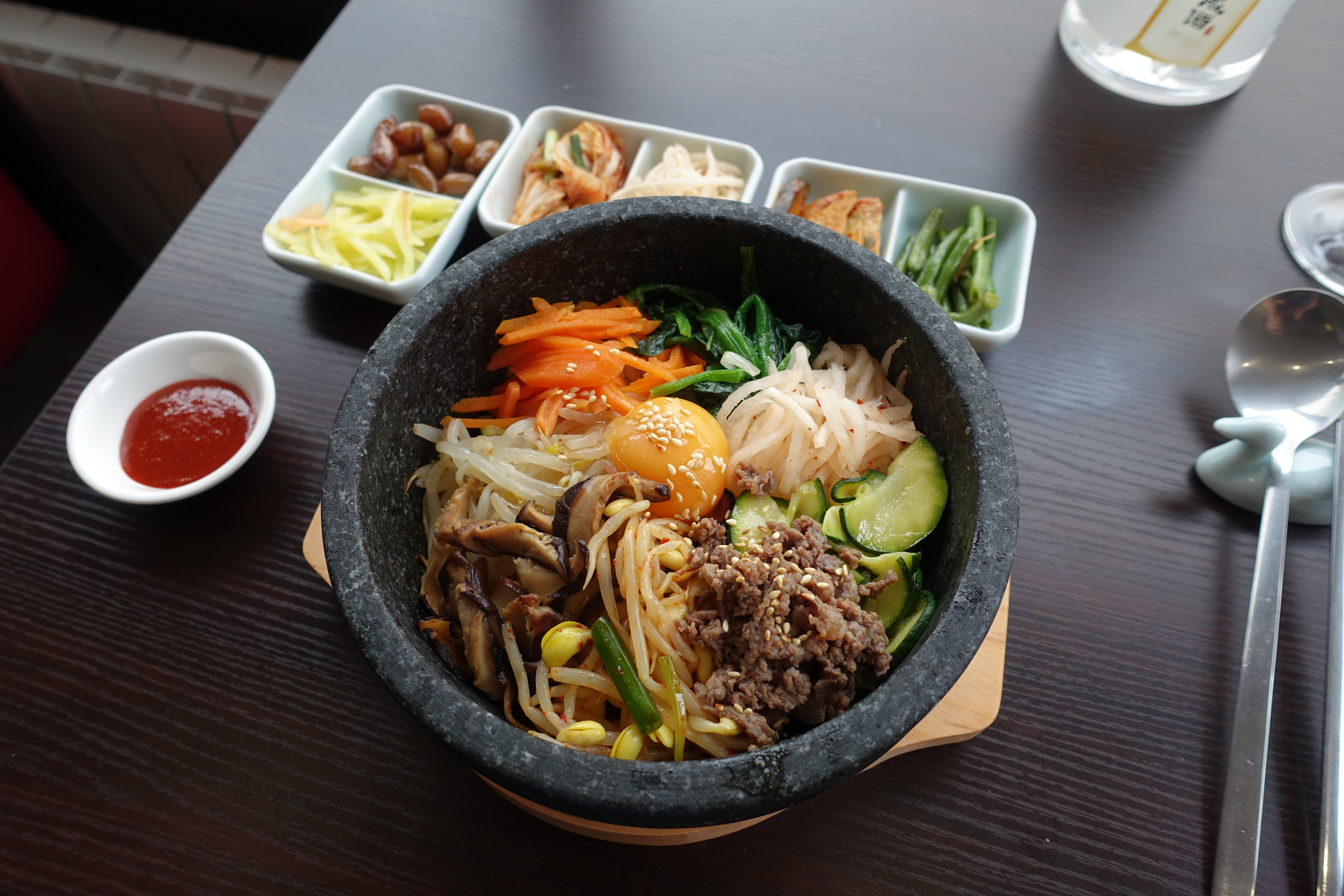
Dolsot bibimbap

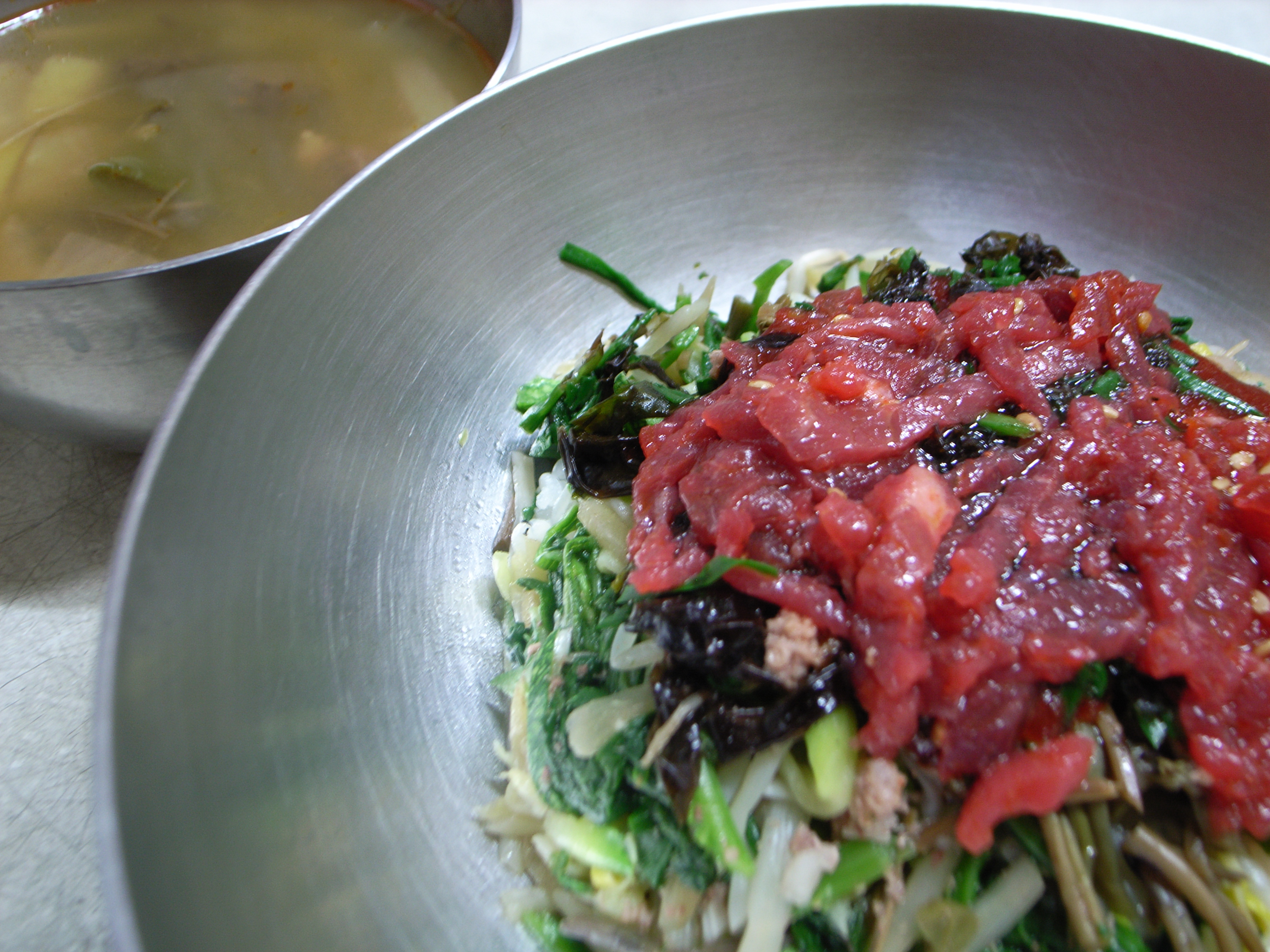
Jinju bibimbap

=== Jeonju ===
Jeonju bibimbap (Korean: 전주비빔밥) along with kongnamul-gukbap (bean sprout and rice soup) are signature dishes of Jeonju. Jeonju bibimbap is usually topped with soy bean sprouts, hwangpo-muk, gochujang, jeopjang, and seasoned raw beef and served with kongnamul-gukbap. The rice of Jeonju bibimbap is specially prepared by being cooked in beef shank broth for flavor and finished with sesame oil for flavor and nutrients. Jeonju also holds a Jeonju Bibimbap Festival every year.

=== Jinju ===
Jinju bibimbap (Korean: 진주비빔밥) is a regional variety of bibimbap associated with Jinju, South Gyeongsang Province. It is typically made by mixing rice with assorted seasoned vegetables, beef yukhoe, broth known as potangguk or botangguk, and red-pepper paste seasoning.

Although local tradition connects Jinju bibimbap with the sharing of mixed rice and vegetables during the Battles of Jinju in the Imjin War, the Hansik Culture Dictionary notes that no surviving documentary evidence establishes its exact origin. By the 1920s, however, Jinju bibimbap was already recognized as a famous local dish. It was mentioned in a 1923 account by Cha Sang-chan, introduced as a representative food of Gyeongsang Province in a 1925 issue of Gaebyeok, and described as a Jinju specialty in a 1929 issue of Byeolgeon-gon.

Distinctive features of Jinju bibimbap include finely seasoned vegetables, the addition of botangguk, beef yukhoe, and a special red-pepper paste known as yeot-gojang. The dish has also been called hwaban, meaning "flower bowl", because of the colorful arrangement of vegetables and other toppings over white rice.

=== Hot stone pot (dolsot bibimbap) ===
Hot stone pot bibimbap (dolsot-bibimbap, 돌솥 비빔밥) is a variation of bibimbap served in a very hot dolsot (stone pot) in which a raw egg is cooked against the sides of the bowl. The bowl is so hot that anything that touches it sizzles for minutes. Before the rice is placed in the bowl, the bottom of the bowl is coated with sesame oil, making the layer of the rice touching the bowl cook to a crisp, golden brown known as nurungji (누릉지). This variation of bibimbap is typically served to order, with the egg and other ingredients mixed in the pot just before consumption.

Stone pots, especially vessels made of gopdol (soapstone), had long been used in Korean cuisine before the modern form of dolsot bibimbap appeared. Historical sources describe stone pots as suitable for cooking rice and porridge, and they were also used for preparing tea and medicinal decoctions.

The modern restaurant dish known as dolsot bibimbap is commonly attributed to Jungang Hoegwan, a bibimbap restaurant located near the Jeonju Post Office. According to the Hansik Culture Dictionary, its owner Namgung Seong developed a stone bowl in 1969 in order to keep bibimbap warm for a longer time. The restaurant then sold bibimbap in these stone bowls under the registered name "Jeonju gopdol bibimbap", and the dish later spread to Seoul after attracting attention at a folk food event organized by Shinsegae Department Store.

In Japan it is called by Ishiyaki bibimbap. It was popularized in Japan through Korean restaurants in Tsuruhashi, Osaka, a district known for Korean cuisine. One commonly cited example is Hakuundai (白雲台), a long-established yakiniku restaurant founded in Tsuruhashi in 1975. Kansai TV reported that Hakuundai is regarded as a restaurant that helped spread ishiyaki bibimbap in Japan. According to the restaurant's owner, Yong-o Oh, when Hakuundai began serving the dish in the late 1980s, stone bowls were not yet available in Japan, and his father, who had come from Korea, brought stone pots from Korea because he believed the dish would become popular in Japan.

In a 2022 interview, Oh similarly recalled that, at a time when stone bowls for the dish were unavailable in Japan, he and his brother were taken to Korea to purchase them, importing around 300 bowls. He also stated that Hakuundai may have been the first restaurant in Japan to serve ishiyaki bibimbap, while noting that he had no documentary proof for this claim.

=== Yakcho ===
Yakcho-bibimbap (약초비빔밥) is from Jecheon. Yak (약) is a historical term for medicinal. Jecheon is a great place for medicinal herbs to grow. People could get a thicker root and more medicinal herb than in other areas. The combination of the medicinal herbs and popular bibimbap made it one of the most popular foods in Jecheon.

=== Hoedeopbap ===
Hoedeopbap (회덮밥) is a bibimbap with a variety of raw seafood, such as olive flounder, salmon, tuna or sometimes octopus, but each bowl of rice usually contains only one variety of seafood. The term hoe in the word means raw fish. The dish is popular along the coasts of Korea, where fish are abundant.

=== Other ===
- Beef tartare (yukhoe)
- Freshwater snail soybean paste (ureong-doenjang)
- Roe (albap)
- Spicy pork (jeyuk)
- Sprout (saessak)
- Tongyeong, served with seafood
- Wild vegetables (sanchae)
- Wild herbs
- Brass bowl

== See also ==
- Bulgogi
- Claypot rice
- Donburi
- Gaifan
- Heotjesabap
- Kamameshi
- Kimchi
- Korean cuisine
- Nasi campur
- Nurungji
- Poke bowl
