= Bap (rice dish) =

Korean name for cooked rice

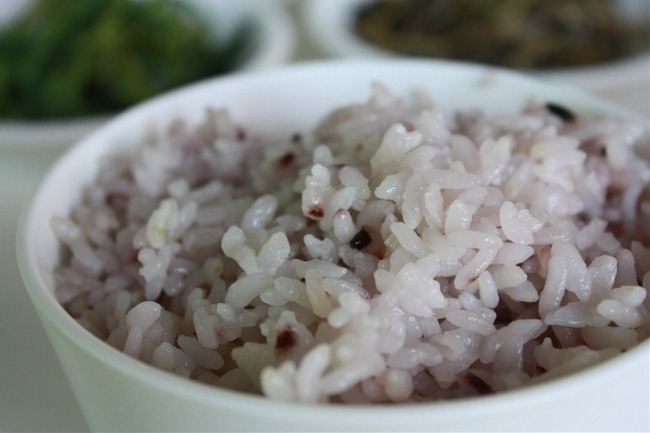
- Place of origin: Korea
- Associated cuisine: Korean cuisine
- Main ingredients: Rice or other grains
- Food energy (per 1 serving): 85 kcal (360 kJ)

Korean name
- Hangul: 밥
- RR: bap
- MR: pap

Honorific terms
- Hangul: 진지; 수라; 메
- RR: jinji; sura; me
- MR: chinji; sura; me

Bap (Korean: 밥) is a Korean name for cooked rice prepared by boiling rice or other grains, such as black rice, barley, sorghum, various millets, and beans, until the water has cooked away. Special ingredients such as vegetables, seafood, and meat can also be added to create different kinds of bap. In the past, except for the socially wealthy class, people used to eat mixed grain rice together with beans and barley rather than only rice.

In Korea, grain food centered on rice has been the most commonly used since ancient times and has established itself as a staple food in everyday diets.

In Korean, the honorific terms for bap (meal) include jinji (진지) for an elderly person, sura (수라) for a monarch, and me (메) for the deceased (in the ancestral rites).

== Preparation ==
Traditionally, bap was made using gamasot (가마솥, a cast iron cauldron) for a large family; however, in modern times, an electronic rice cooker is usually used to cook rice. A regular heavy-bottomed pot or dolsot (돌솥, stone pot) can also be used. Nowadays, rice cooked in gamasot or dolsot are called sotbap, and are considered delicacies. More nurungji (누룽지, scorched rice) is produced when making gamasot-bap (cast iron cauldron rice) and dolsot-bap (stone pot rice).

To make bap, rice is scrubbed in water and rinsed several times. This process produces tteumul (뜨물, water from the last washing of rice). It is then soaked for thirty minutes before boiling, which helps the grains cook evenly. With unpolished brown rice and bigger grains such as yulmu (율무, Coix lacryma-jobi var. ma-yuen), it is necessary to soak the grains for several hours to overnight to avoid undercooking. The grains are then cooked. In a regular heavy-bottomed pot, rice can be cooked over medium high heat with the lid on for about ten minutes, stirred, and then left to simmer on low heat for additional five to ten minutes.

The scorched rice in the bottom of the pot or cauldron, nurungji, can be eaten as snacks or used to make sungnyung (숭늉, an infusion made from boiling scorched rice).

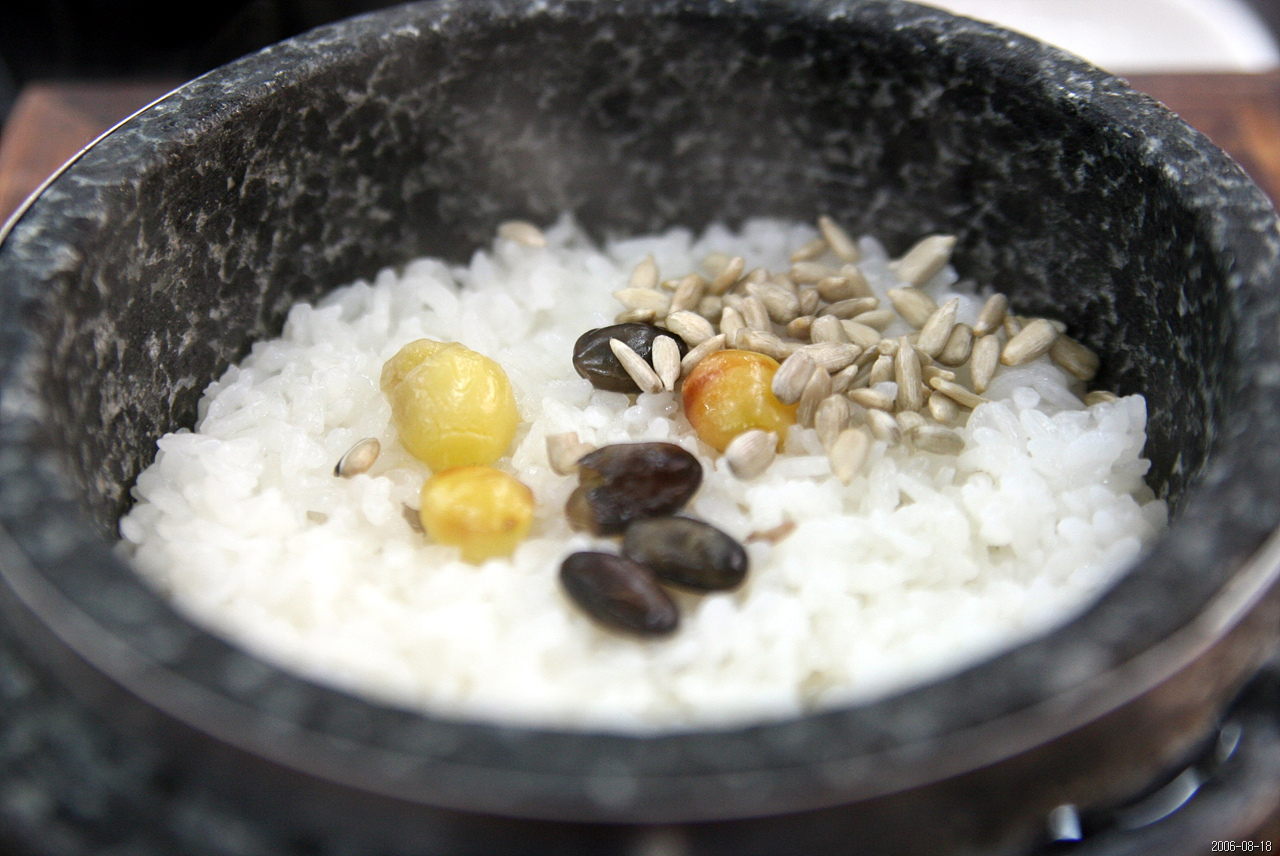
stone pot rice

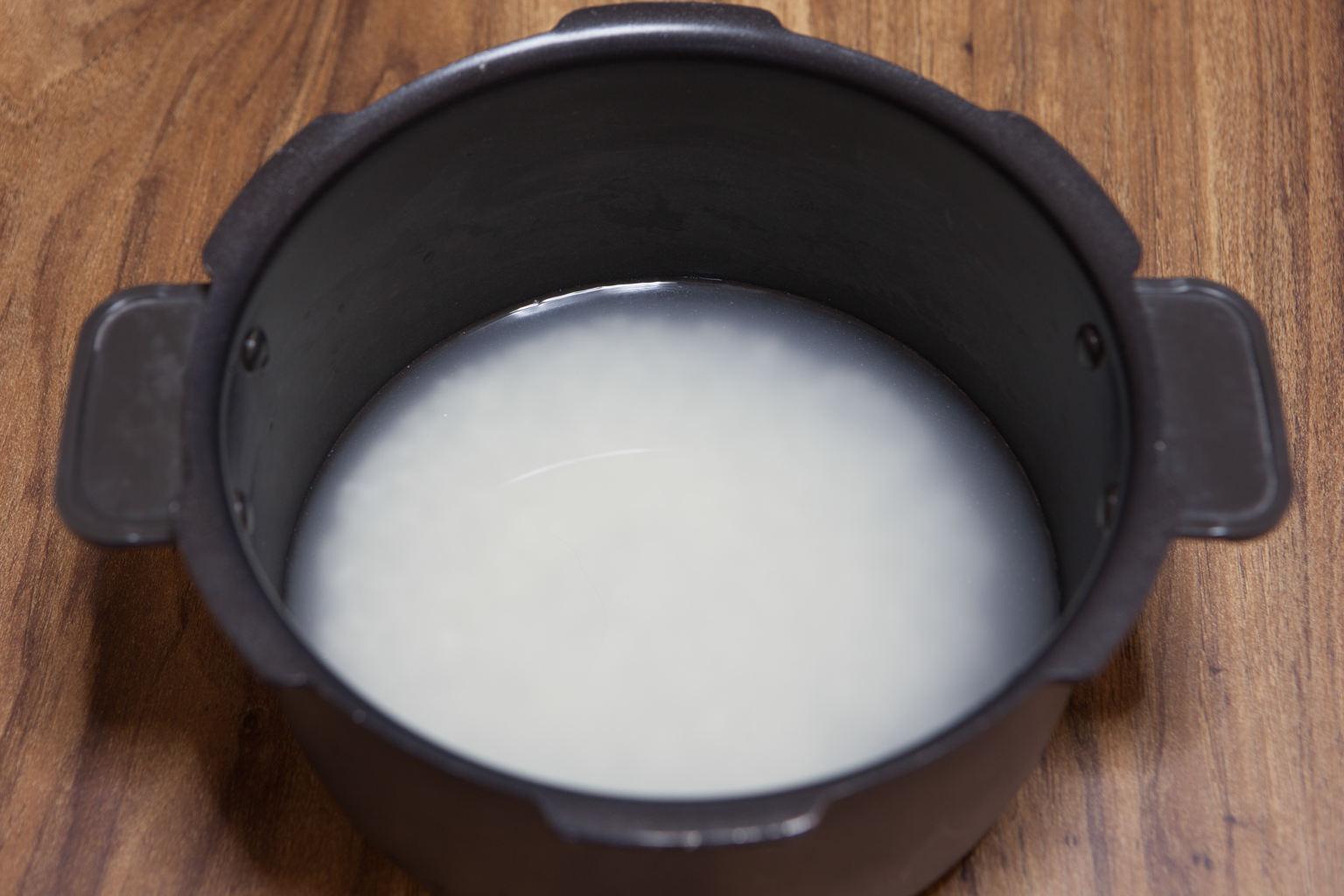
tteumul

== Types ==
=== Ingredients ===
==== Rice ====
Bap refers to Korean cooked rice. Bap is a popular staple dish in Korea and also signifies the culinary corpus of Koreans (Chung et al. 2017). The bap meal offers significant nutrition and energy and is widely considered as medicinal by many Koreans. It has high stickiness and sheen, and is hence easy to digest due to possession of adequate moisture (Chung et al. 2017). As a result, the bap meal signifies the Korean cultural concern for medicinal aid from natural products rather than artificial ones. The dish remains one of the most popular in the Korean cuisine due to its distinctiveness from normal cooked rice and added nutritional value. The most basic bap made of rice is called ssalbap (쌀밥, "rice bap"), or often just bap. As rice itself occurs in colours other than white, the bap made of all white rice is called huinssal-bap (흰쌀밥, "white rice bap") or ssalbap. When black rice is mixed, it is called heungmi-bap (흑미밥, "black rice bap").

When cooked with all brown rice (unpolished rice) or white rice mixed with brown rice, it is called hyeonmi-bap (현미밥, "brown rice bap"), while bap cooked with all glutinous rice or white rice mixed with glutinous rice is called chapssal-bap (찹쌀밥, "glutinous rice bap"). Unpolished glutinous rice can also be used to cook bap, in which case it is called hyeonmi-chapssal-bap (현미찹쌀밥, "brown glutinous rice bap").

Bap made of regular non-glutinous white rice (polished rice) can be referred to as baekmi-bap (백미밥, "white rice bap") when compared to hyeonmibap, and as mepssal-bap (멥쌀밥, "non-glutinous rice bap") when compared to chalbap/chapssalbap.

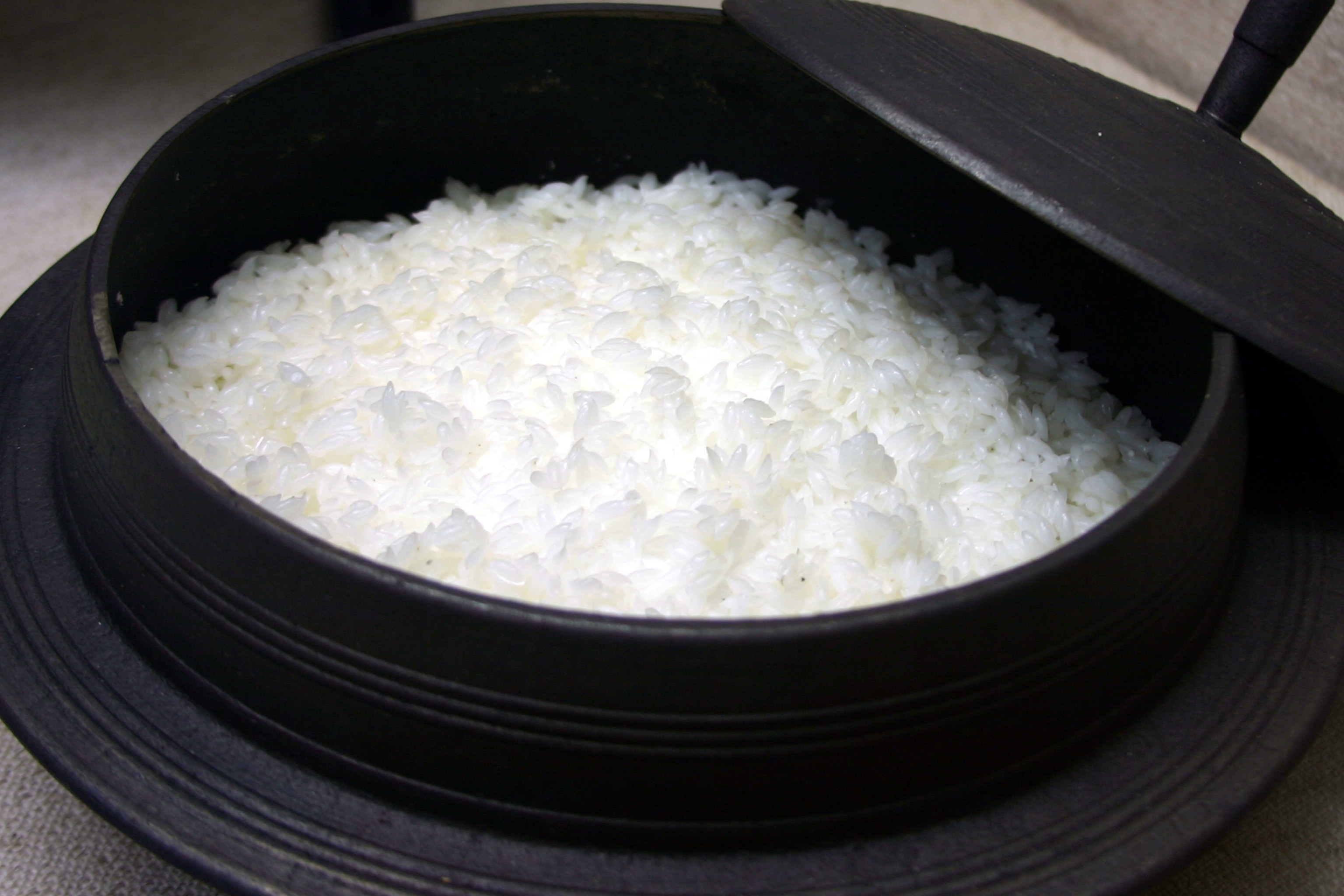
White rice

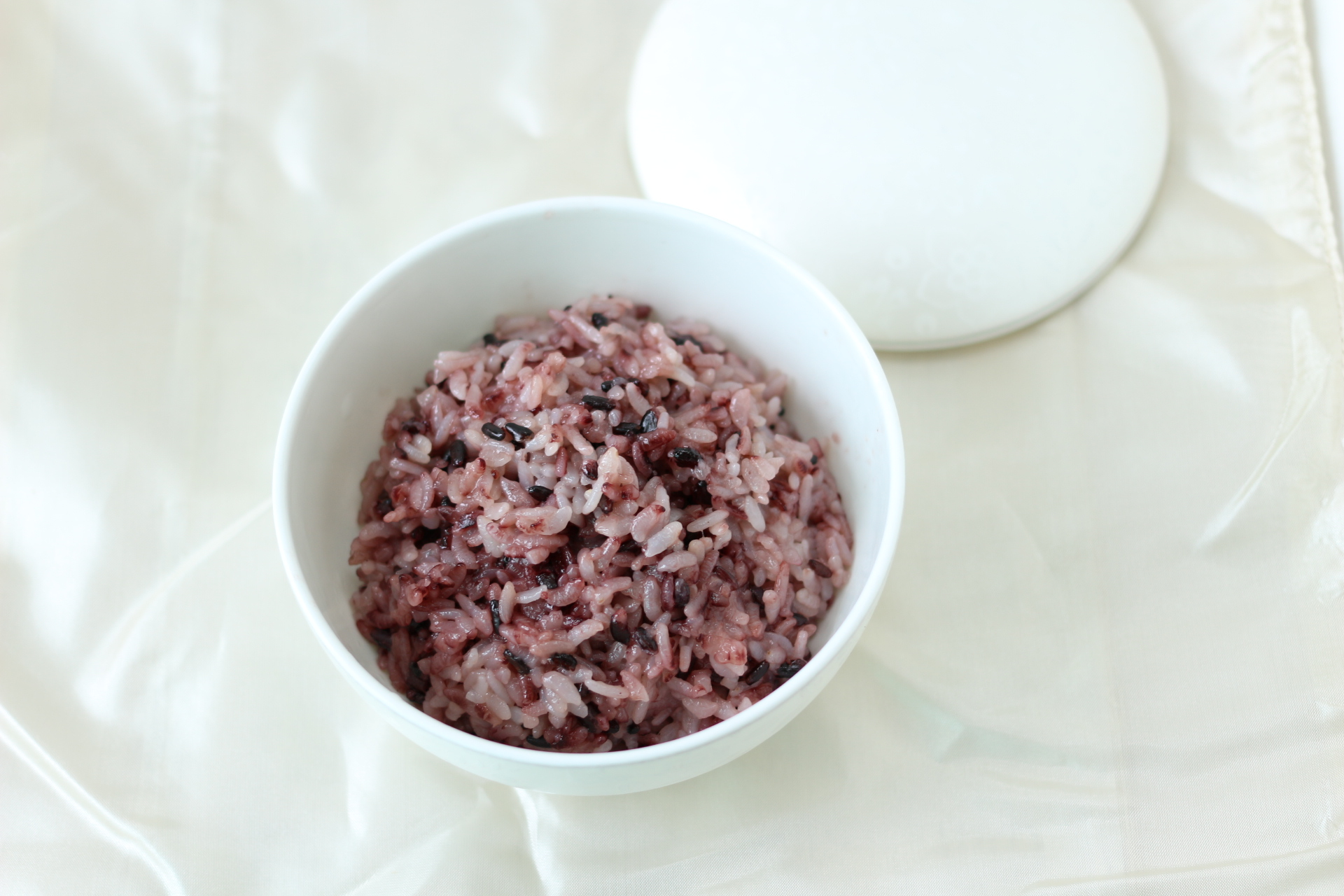
Black rice

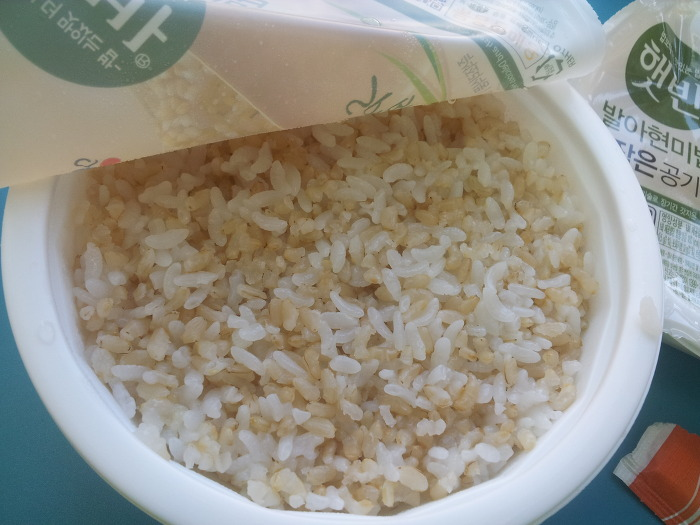
Instant brown rice

==== Rice or other grains ====
Bap made of rice mixed with various other grains is called japgok-bap (잡곡밥, "multi-grain rice"). On the day of Daeboreum, the first full moon of the year, Koreans eat ogok-bap (오곡밥, "five-grain rice") made of glutinous rice, proso millet, sorghum, black beans, and red bean, or chalbap (찰밥, "sticky rice") made of glutinous rice, red bean, chestnut, jujube, and black beans.

When rice is mixed with one other grain, the bap is named after the mixed ingredient. The examples are:

- bori-bap (보리밥, "barley rice")
- kongbap (콩밥, "bean rice")
- gijang-bap (기장밥, "proso millet rice")
- jobap (조밥, "foxtail millet rice")
- memil-bap (메밀밥, "buckwheat rice")
- nokdu-bap (녹두밥, "mung bean rice")
- oksusu-bap (옥수수밥, "corn rice")
- patbap (팥밥, "red bean rice")
- susu-bap (수수밥, "sorghum rice")

Some grains can be cooked without rice. Bap made of barley without rice is called kkong-bori-bap (꽁보리밥), while bap made of both rice and barley is called bori-bap (보리밥).

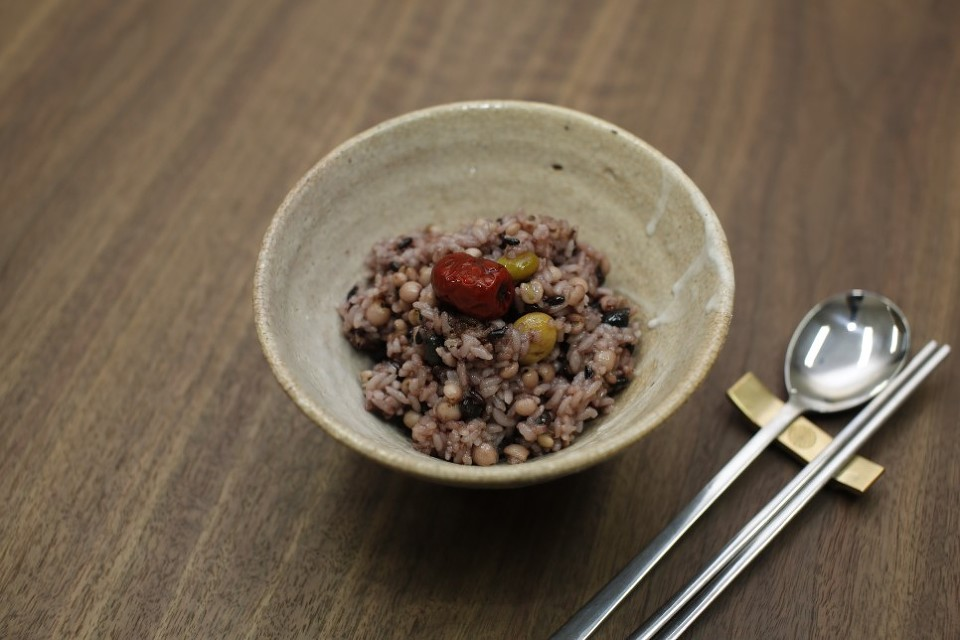
Multi-grain rice

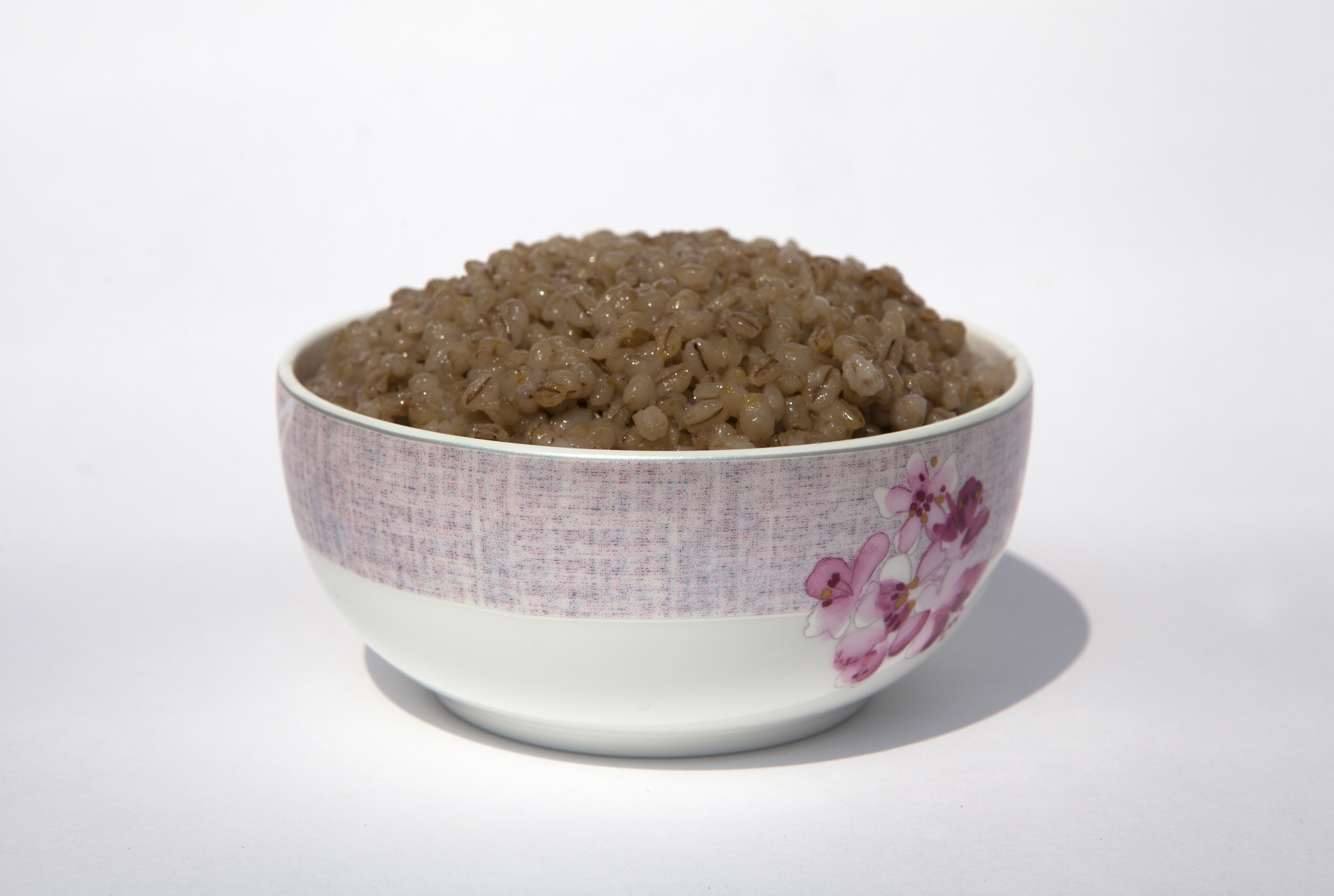
Cooked barley

==== Special ingredients ====
Byeolmi-bap (별미밥, "special delicacy rice") or byeolbap (별밥, "special rice") can be made by mixing in special ingredients such as vegetables, seafood, and meat. For example, namul-bap (나물밥, "namul rice") is made of rice mixed with namul vegetables. Some popular byeolmibap varieties include:

- bambap (밤밥, "chestnut rice")
- biji-bap (비지밥, "tofu dreg rice")
- gamja-bap (감자밥, "potato rice")
- gondeure-bap (곤드레밥, "gondre rice")
- gulbap (굴밥, "oyster rice")
- gyeran-bap (계란밥, "egg rice")
- jogae-bap (조개밥, "clam rice")
- kongnamul-bap (콩나물밥, "soybean sprout rice")
- mubap (무밥, "radish rice")
- songi-bap (송이밥, "pine mushroom rice")
- ssukbap (쑥밥, "mugwort rice")
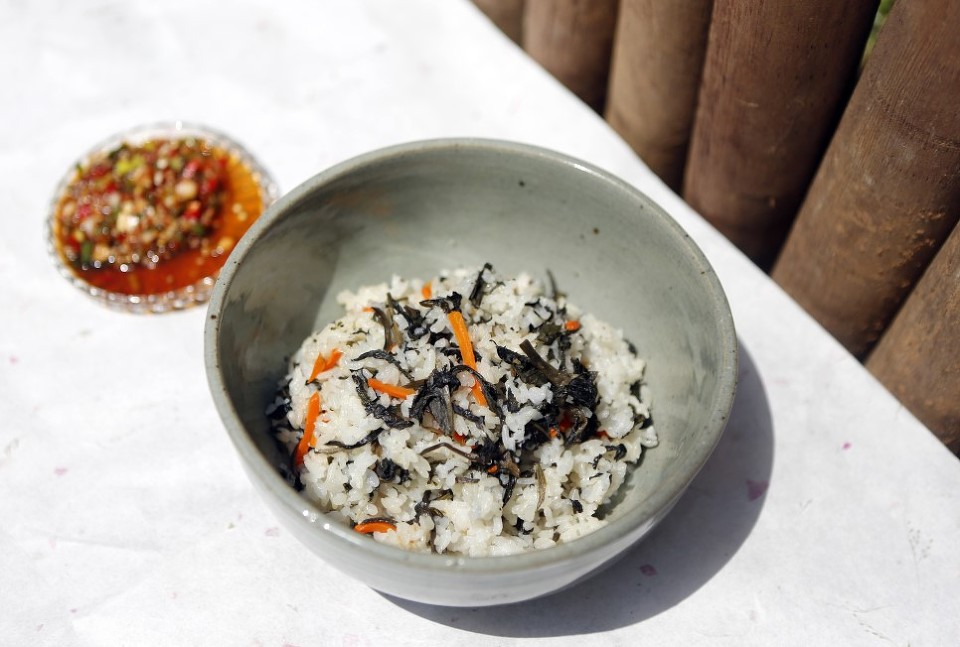
Gondre rice

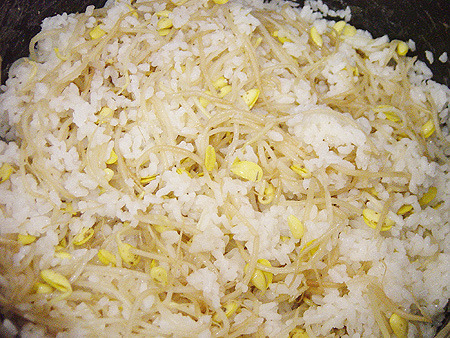
Soybean sprout rice

== Dishes ==
There are many bap dishes such as bibimbap (비빔밥, "mixed rice"), bokkeum-bap (볶음밥, "fried rice") and gimbap (김밥, "seaweed rice").

- bibimbap (비빔밥, "mixed rice") – rice topped with seasoned vegetables, meat, mushrooms, eggs, seasonings, and other additives. All the ingredients are stirred before eating
- bokkeum-bap (볶음밥, "fried rice") – rice stir-fried with chopped vegetables or meat in oil
- deopbap (덮밥, "topped rice") – cooked rice topped with something that can be served as a side dish (for example, hoedeopbap is topped with hoe.)
- gimbap (김밥, "seaweed rice") – a dish made by rolling rice and various other ingredients in gim (edible laver) and cutting them into bite-size slices
- gukbap (국밥, "soup rice") – cooked rice put into or boiled in a hot soup
- heotjesatbap (헛제삿밥, "pseudo-jesa rice") – a bimbimbap-like dish served with vegetables traditionally used in ancestral rites
- jumeok-bap (주먹밥, "rice ball") – cooked rice made into balls
- ssambap (쌈밥, "rice wraps") – cooked rice along with several side dishes and ssamjang on a leaf of lettuce, perilla, etc.
- yakbap (약밥, "sweet rice") – steamed glutinous rice mixed with honey, jujubes, soy sauce, sesame oil, chestnuts, pine nuts, etc.
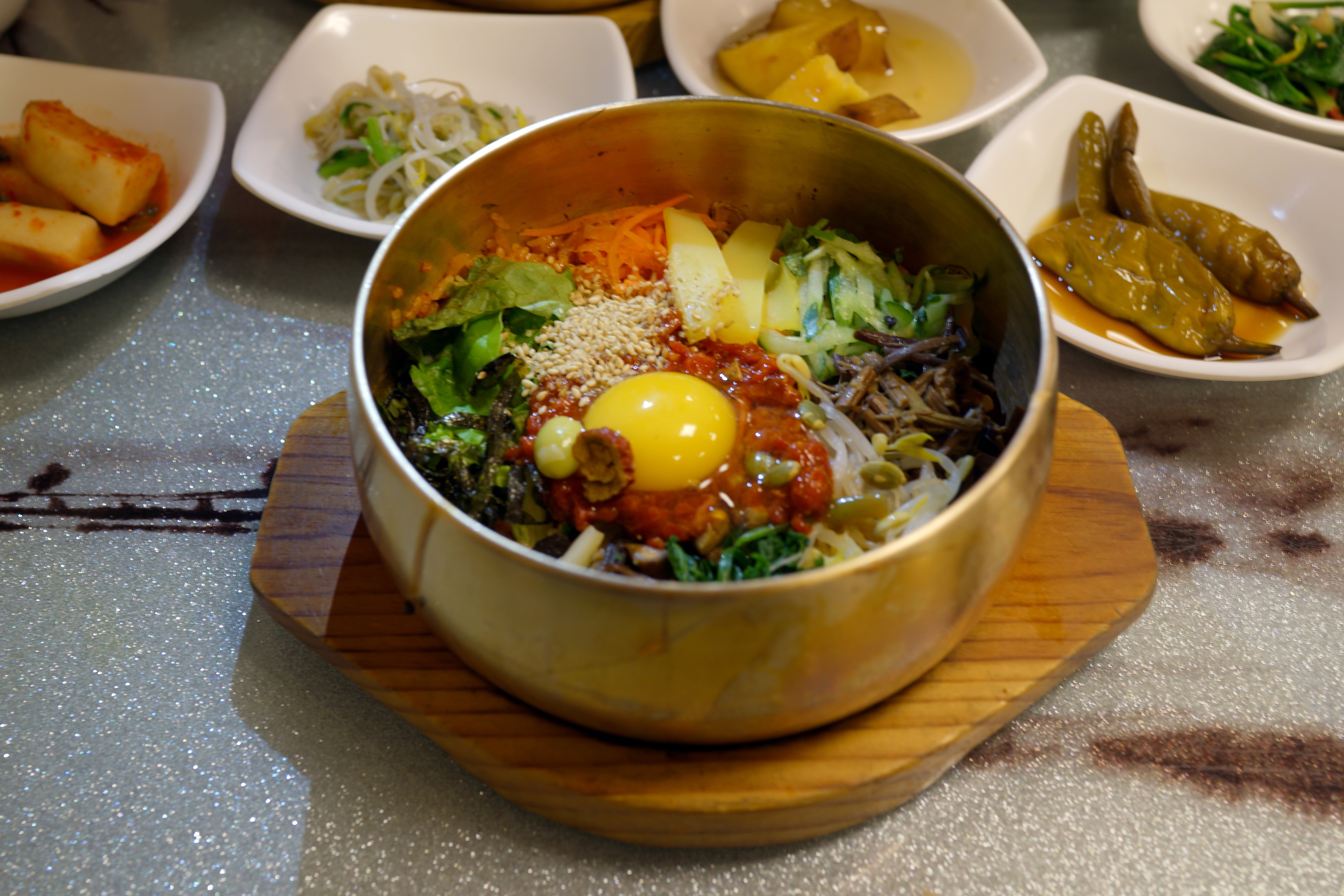
Bibimbap

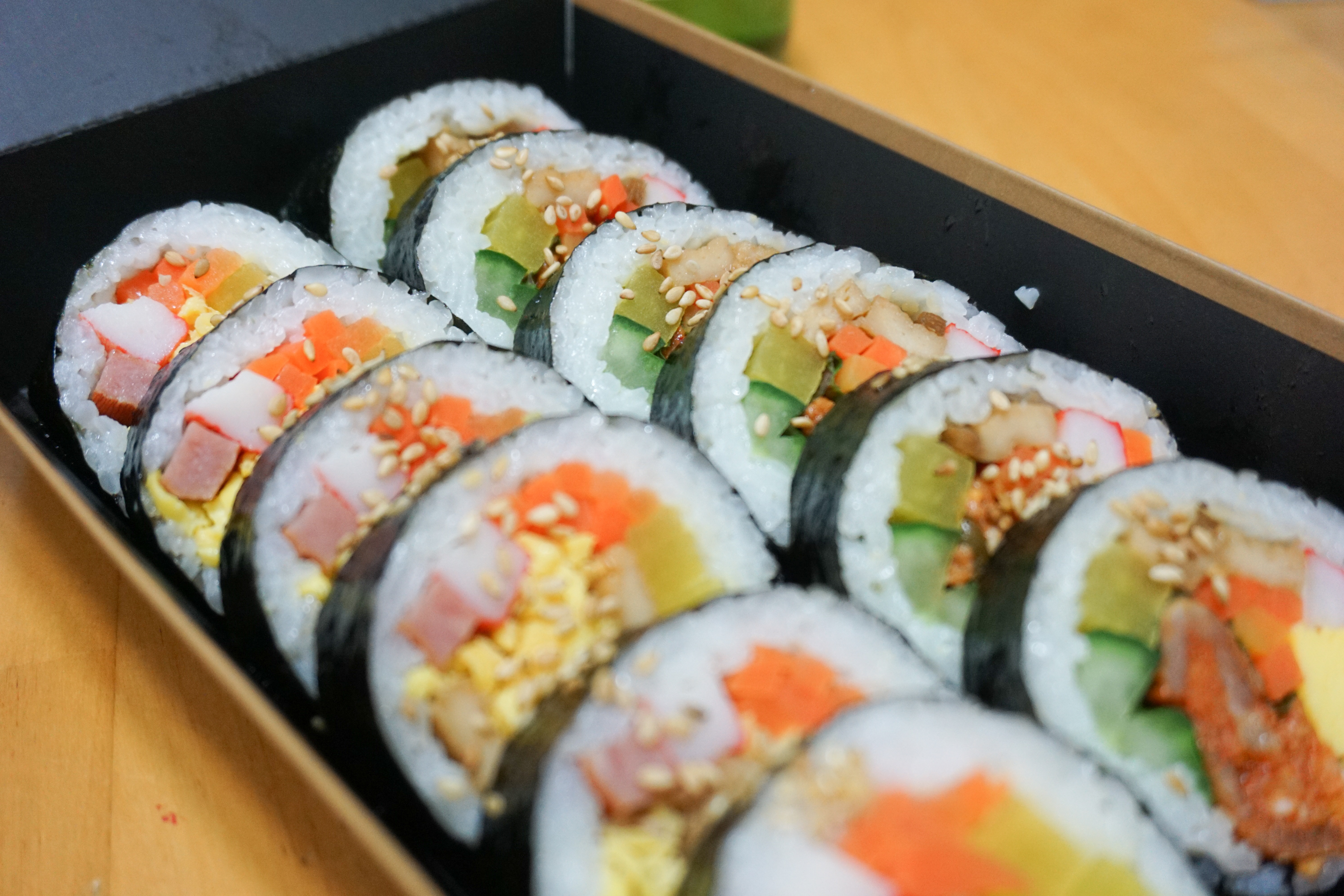
Gimbap

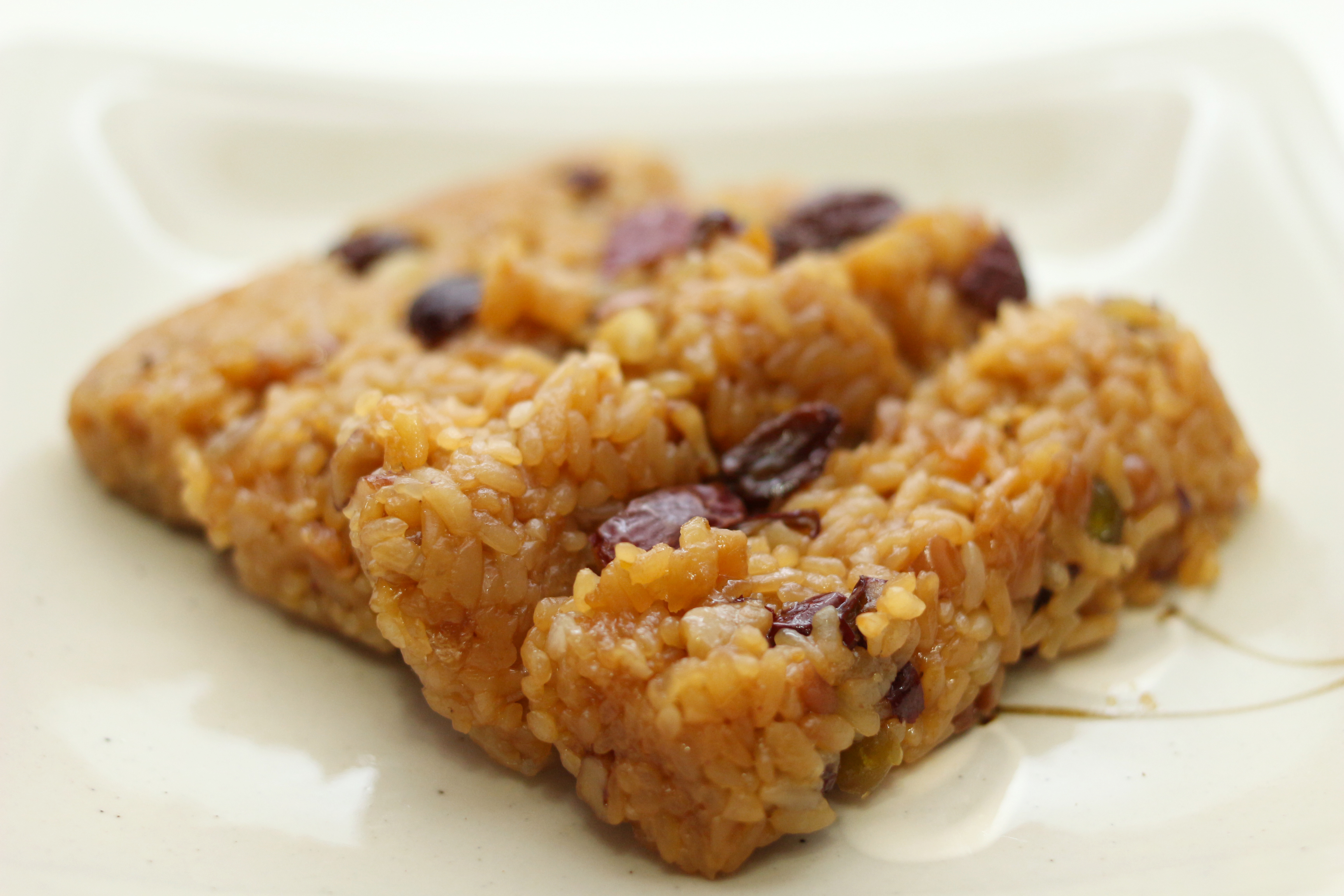
Yakbap

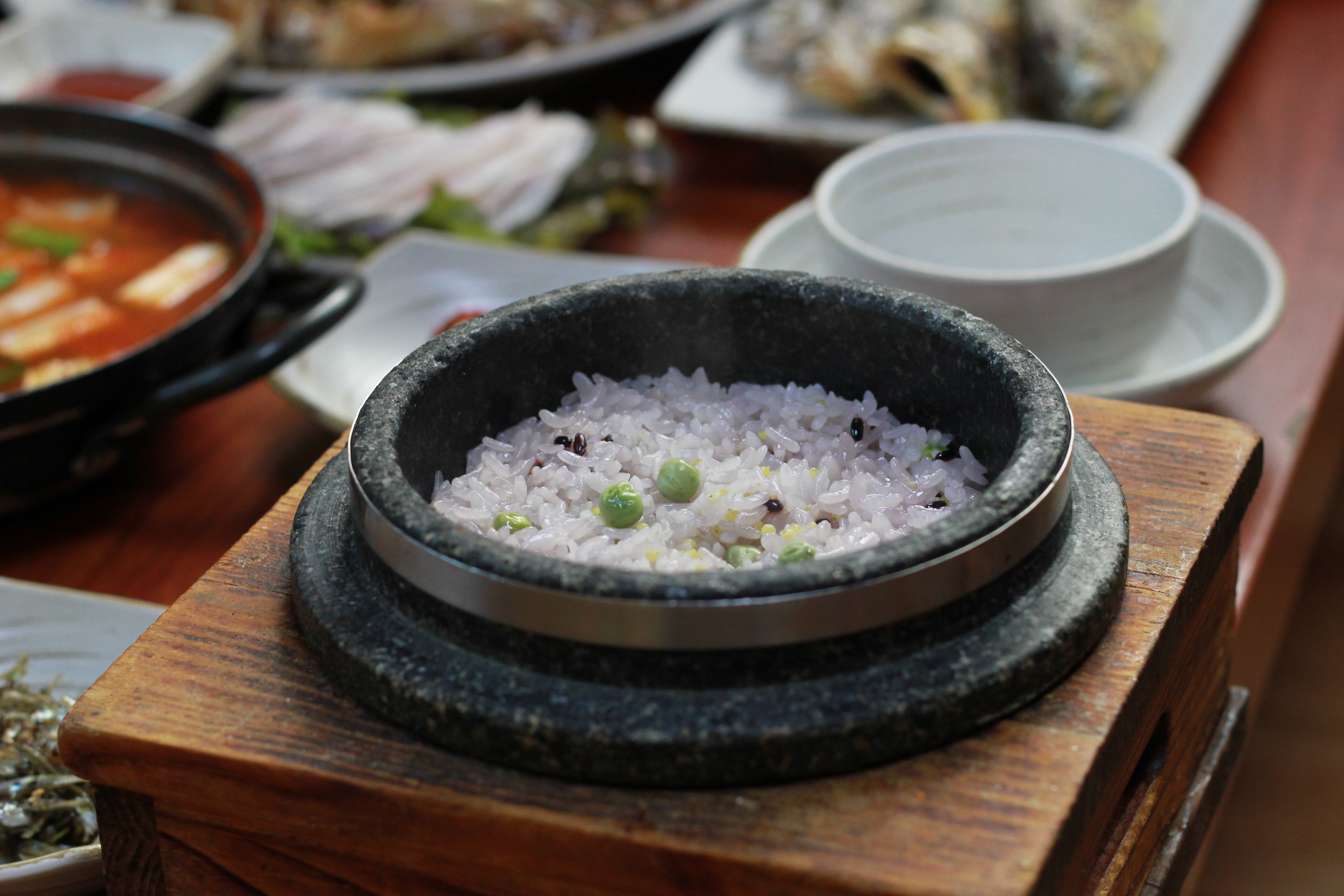
Stone pot rice

== See also ==
- List of rice dishes
- Steamed rice
