= Oju yŏnmun changjŏn san'go =

19th-century Korean encyclopedia

Oju yŏnmun changjŏn san'go (Korean: 오주연문장전산고; Hanja: 五洲衍文長箋散稿; lit. Random Expatiations of Oju) is a general encyclopedia written by Yi Kyugyŏng during the late Joseon-era. It spans 60 books, covering 1,417 topics from astronomy to religion.

The document was lost until the 1920s, until National Script Research Institute member Kwŏn Posang (권보상) found it being used as a wrapping paper for baked chestnuts. He took it to the Chosŏn Kwangmunhoe, an organization founded in 1910 by Ch'oe Namsŏn to publish classical Korean literature, which confirmed its authenticity.
