= Hoe-deopbap =

Korean dish

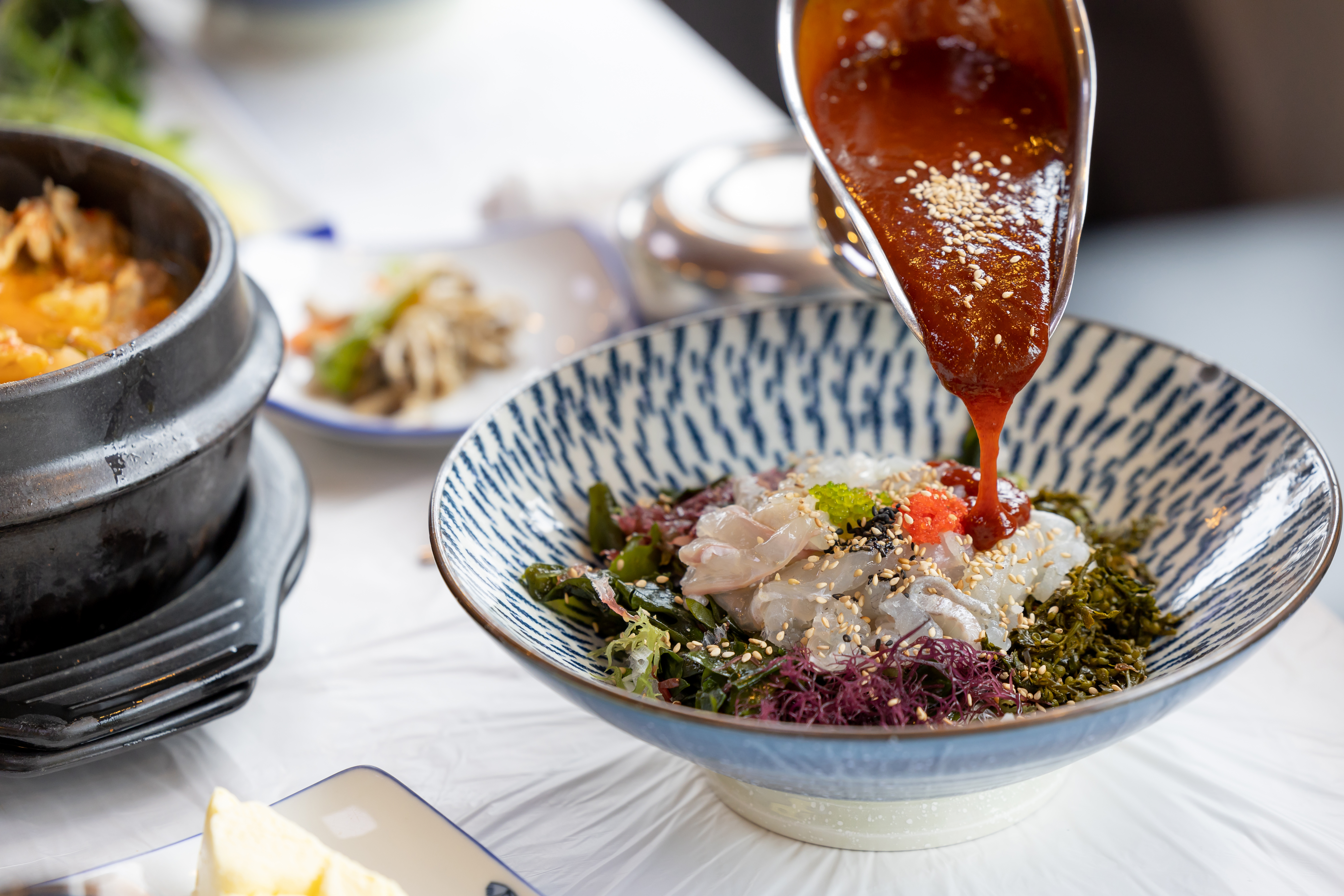
- Haecho Hoe-deopbap
- Type: Bibimbap
- Place of origin: Korea

Korean name
- Hangul: 회덮밥
- Hanja: 膾덮밥
- RR: hoedeopbap
- MR: hoedŏppap
- IPA: [hwe̞.dʌp̚.p͈ap̚]

Hoe-deopbap (Korean: 회덮밥) or raw fish bibimbap is a Korean dish consisting of steamed rice mixed with sliced or cubed saengseon hoe (raw fish), various vegetables such as lettuce, cucumber and sesame leaves, sesame oil, and chogochujang (a sauce made from vinegar, gochujang, and sugar). The fish used for making hoedeopbap is generally either halibut, sea bass, rockfish, tuna, salmon, or whitefish.

The manner of eating hoedeopbap is almost the same as that used to eat bibimbap: using a spoon, all the ingredients are mixed by the diner at the table before eating.

There are different varieties named according to their ingredients, such as gul hoedeopbap (굴회덮밥) made from raw oysters and gajami hoedeopbap (가자미 회덮밥) made from raw sole, a specialty dish from Gangneung and its neighboring regions.

== Gallery ==
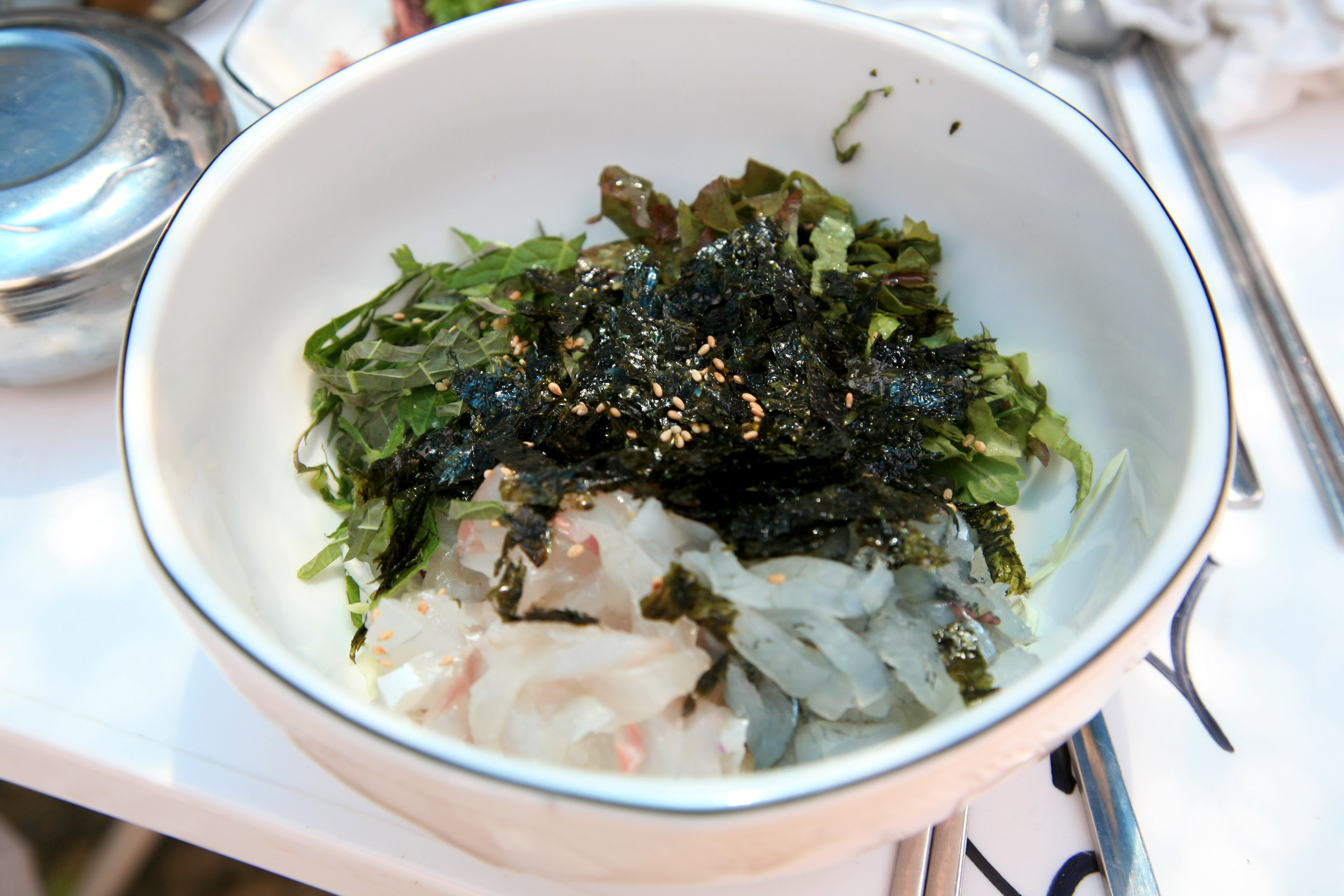
Seaweed can be used as a topping to add saltiness

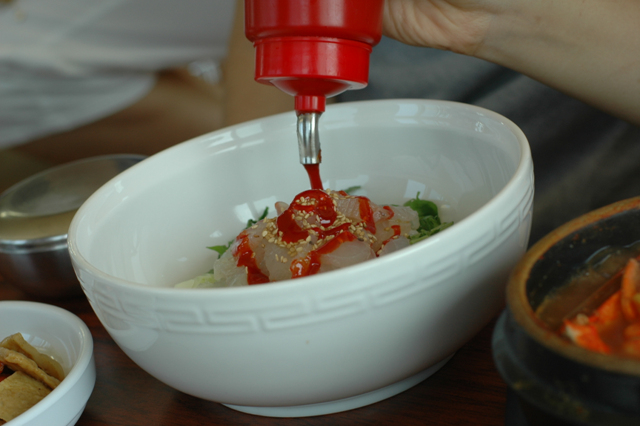
Gochujang is usually added to the top of hoedeopbap

== See also ==
- Albap, fish roe bibimbap
- Poke (Hawaiian dish)
