= Heotjesatbap =

Korean bibimbap variant

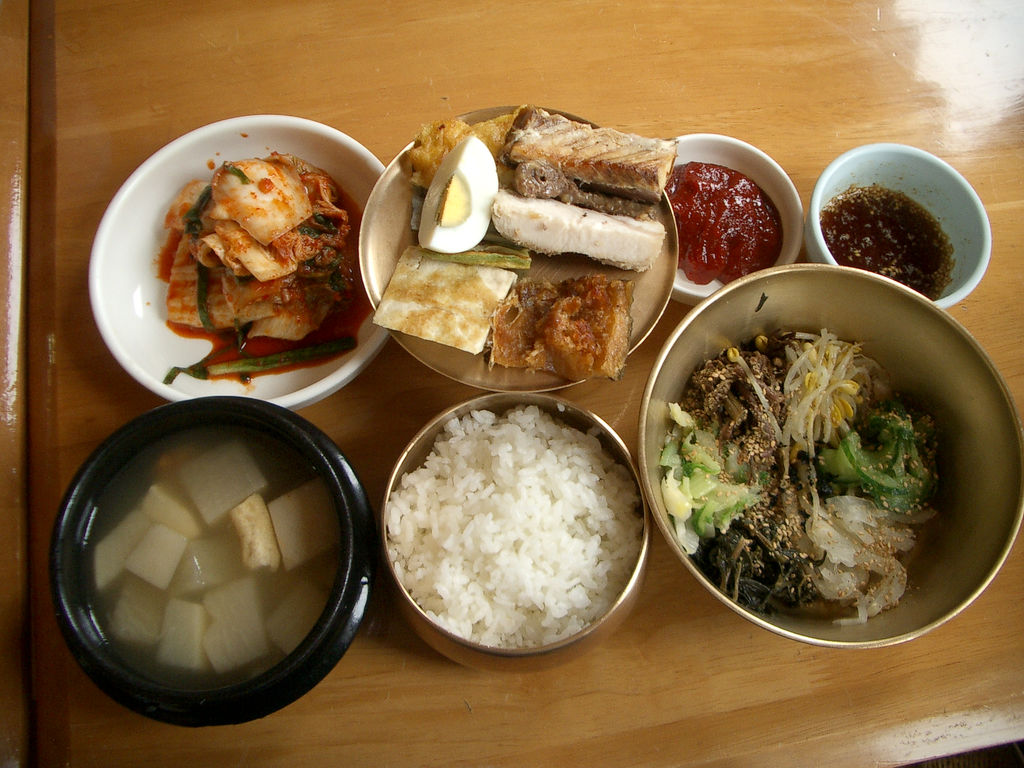

Korean name
- Hangul: 헛제삿밥
- Hanja: 헛祭祀밥
- RR: heotjesatbap
- MR: hŏtchesappap

Heotjesatbap (Korean: 헛제삿밥, also spelled heotjesabap), a traditional Korean dish, is a variety of bibimbap, served with soy sauce (ganjang) instead of the gochujang (hot pepper paste) that is more commonly used. Heotjesabap consists of mainly several types of namul (young sprouted vegetables) over white rice. It is also served with grilled fish and some jeon (Korean pancake).

The term heotjesa bap literally means "mock jesa meal", with jesa being Korean death anniversary ceremonies, during which the living relatives of the deceased prepare and offer a variety of dishes to the spirits of their departed ancestors and relatives. In most modern jesa, the feast is offered to the ancestors through a ceremony involving different family members placing dishes of food on the table and pouring rice wine into cups, as gracious hosts would do for their guests. After the food and drink is set out in a specific order, the family members leave the room to give the spirits time to enjoy it. After a few minutes, the eldest male relative clears his throat to signal to the spirits that they are going to come back in, and the family then takes the food into a separate room and all eat and drink the offerings together, connecting them with the deceased after having paid them respect.

The dish originated in Andong, North Gyeongsang Province, a famous place where scholars, called seonbi, lived and studied during the Joseon period. It is said that as there was insufficient foods during the period, some seonbi scholars of the yangban class living in the region prepared ceremonial foods for fake jesa and enjoyed the dishes as well as commoners did. These dishes were considered "fake" because they were consumed rather than used in a jesa ceremony, which during the time would be covered with incense ash and rendered inedible. It was commonly eaten as a late-night snack by studying scholars.
