= Dolsot =

Korean cookware or serveware

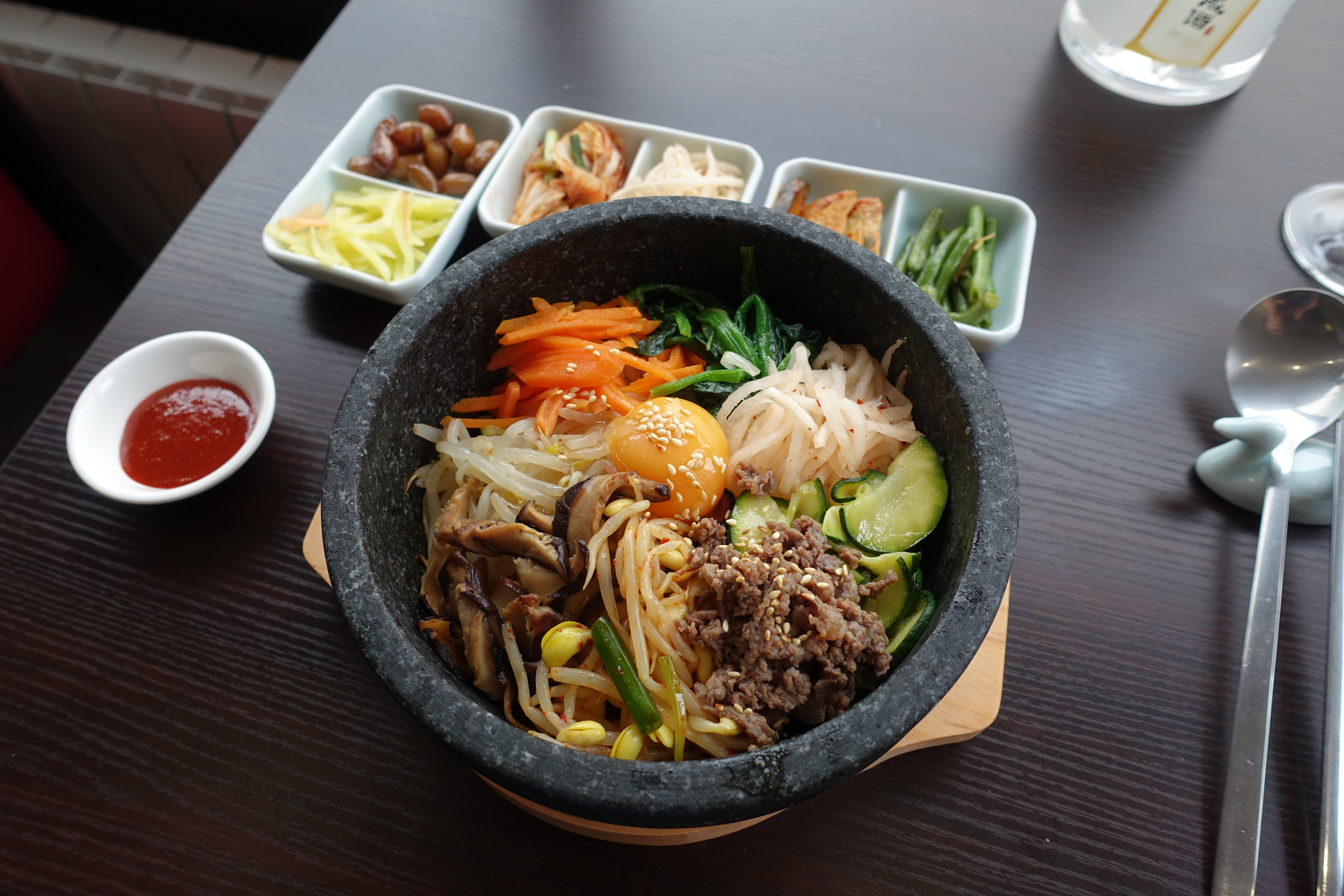
- Dolsot-bibimbap, bibimbap served in a dolsot

Korean name
- Hangul: 돌솥
- RR: dolsot
- MR: tolsot
- IPA: tol.sot̚

Alternate name
- Hangul: 곱돌솥
- RR: gopdolsot
- MR: koptolsot
- IPA: kop̚.t͈ol.sot̚

A dolsot (Korean: 돌솥; lit. 'stone pot') or gopdolsot (곱돌솥; lit. 'agalmatolite pot') is a small-sized piece of cookware or serveware made of amphibole, suitable for one to two servings of bap (cooked rice). In Korean cuisine, various hot rice dishes such as bibimbap or gulbap (oyster rice) as well as plain white rice can be prepared and served in dolsot. As a dolsot does not cool off as soon as removed from the stove, rice continues to cook and arrives at the table still sizzling.

On the bottom of a dolsot, there is a thin crust of scorched rice, to be scraped off and eaten in the case of bibimbap or made into sungnyung (숭늉, infusion) in the case of unseasoned rice dishes. In the former case, dolsot can be brushed with sesame oil beforehand to facilitate scraping. To make sungnyung, the unscorched part of rice is scooped and transferred into another serving bowl right after being served, and hot water or tea (usually mild-grain teas such as barley tea or corn tea) is poured into the dolsot while it is still blistering hot. The infusion with loosened chunks of scorched rice remains warm until the end of the meal, when it is typically savored.

== Dolsot-bibimbap ==
Dolsot-bibimbap is a dish where the bibimbap is served inside of the dolsot to help keep the meal at a consistent temperature for long periods of time and continue to cook the bibimbap even after it is served. It usually consists of rice, carrots, mushrooms, carrots, eggs, spinach, sea tangle, bean sprouts, and beef mixed with gochujang in a hot dolsot. Historically; however, it was first created by peasants who mixed any vegetables on hand with a variety of cooked grains. This dish was first created in the 1960s and 1970s at a bibimbap restaurant in western South Korea.

== Dolsot-bap ==
Dolsot-bap is a simplified version of dolsot bibimbap where rice is the center of the meal. It consists of either white rice or rice with red beans mixed with pine nuts, jujubes, ginkgo nuts, beans, chestnuts, fresh ginseng root, and, sometimes, sesame soy sauce with chopped garden or wild chives. Variations of this dish also exist. For example, songi-dolsot-bap specifically includes pine mushrooms and seafood and is eaten in autumn. In the winter, gul-bap is another variation which includes oysters, honghap-bap has mussels, and mu-bap has chopped radish mixed in.

Once one has finished eating the soft rice, there is a layer of nurungji at the bottom of the stone dolsot. Adding water to the nurungji creates sungnyung after the water is warmed from the heat the dolsot had maintained. Often, sungnyung is eaten with salted seafood or pickled vegetables over any food with a strong or displeasing odor as many claim that it is necessary to finish off a meal of dolsot-bap this way.

The origin of dolsot-bap is still a mystery; however, some theories do exist. One of them is that some dignitaries had visited the palace and dolsot-bap was first created for them. Others believe that it was for a Buddhist prayer ceremony. The Joseon dynasty royal family had gone to Beopju temple at Songnisan(also known as Sokri Mountain) and the temple monks cooked dolsot-bap using available and spare ingredients. Still others say that dolsot had been used by the Choi clan from Jangsu(this area was known to have talc which is used to make dolsot). They had offered the dolsot to King Sukjong during the Joseon dynasty.

The king and queens’ food were prepared separately in the royal palace. The royal chefs would start a charcoal fire in a large brass brazier and place the dolsot upon two flat iron rods to boil water and then later add rice. This process was done in order to achieve a softer texture for the rice. Only two servings, one for the king and one for the queen, were prepared as dolsot-bap was historically reserved for those in more noble positions. In the modern world dolsot-bap is now more common. Some restaurants even sell dolsot-bap in place of plain rice. During the 1997 Asian Financial Crisis, dolsot-bap helped keep many businesses going even through the harsh economic climates.

== Agalmatolite stone ==
Agalmatolite stone, sometimes referred to as pyrophyllite, is used to create dolsot. Its low thermal conductivity and high corrosion resistance make it an optimal material for cookware. It keeps from rusting even after being used many times and insulates heat to continue cooking the dish kept inside. Additionally, agalmatolite is lightweight and does not warp well when exposed to heat. These qualities allow for it to easily be used for single serving bowls and be used over long periods of time even after repeatedly being exposed to high heat.

== Gallery ==
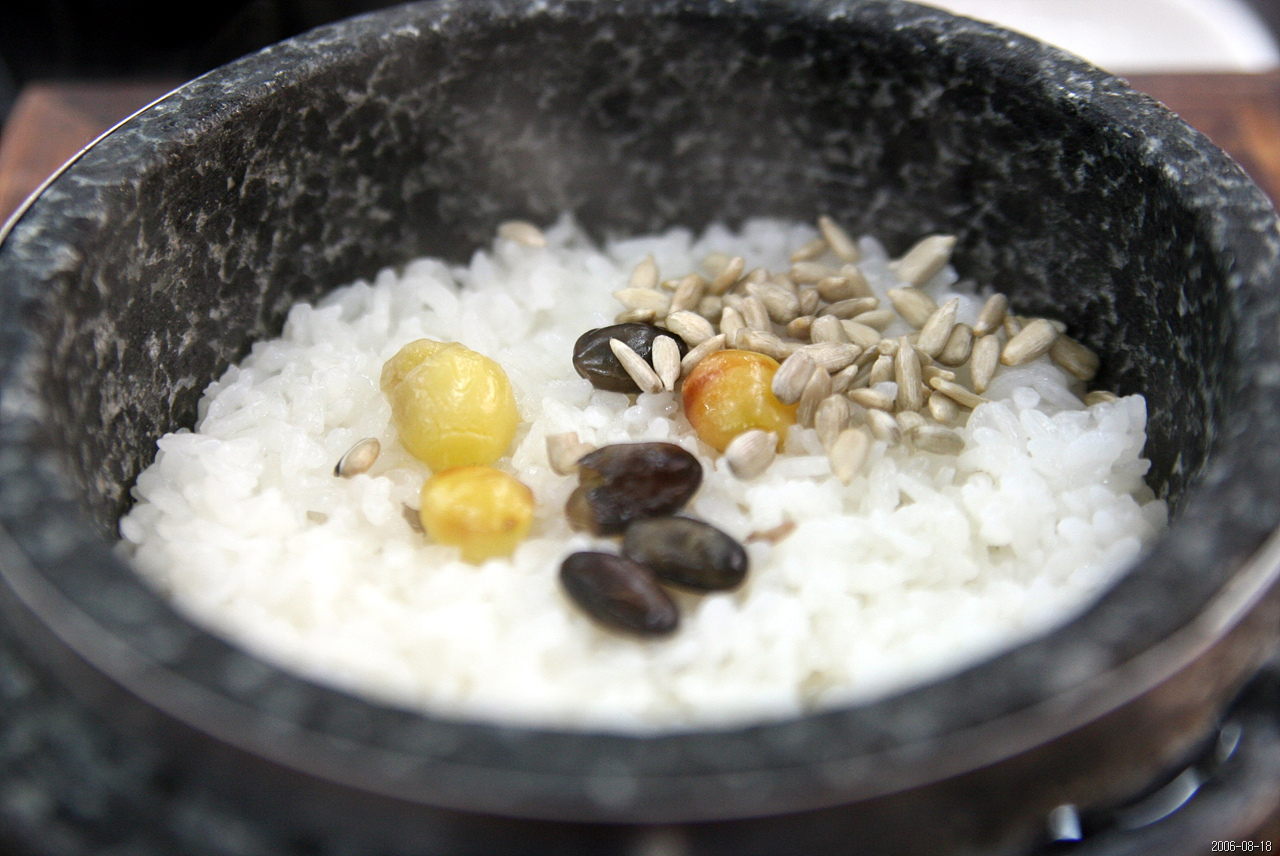
Bap (rice) cooked and served in dolsot

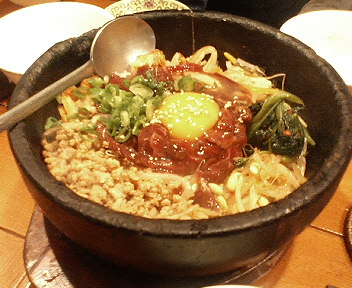
Yukhoe-bibimbap (beef tartare bibimbap) in dolsot

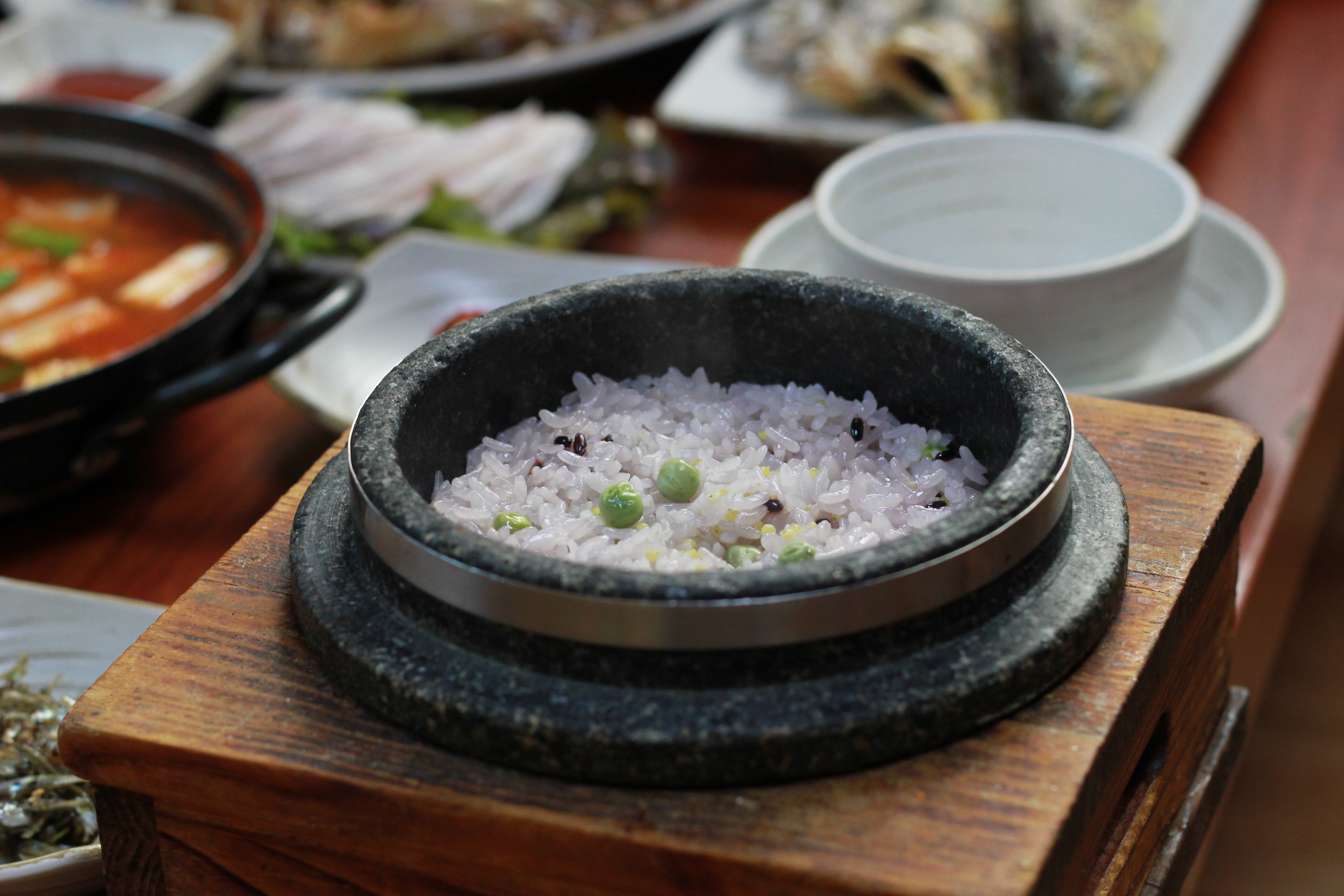
Dolsot in a wood container to prevent injury caused by the heat

== See also ==
- Gamasot
- List of cooking vessels
- Ttukbaegi
