= Yi Kyugyŏng =

Joseon scholar (fl. 18th/19th centuries)

- Hangul: 이규경
- Hanja: 李圭景
- RR: I Gyugyeong
- MR: I Kyugyŏng

Art name
- Hangul: 오주, 소운거사
- Hanja: 五洲, 嘯雲居士
- RR: Oju, Soungeosa
- MR: Oju, Soun'gŏsa

Courtesy name
- Hangul: 백규
- Hanja: 伯揆
- RR: Baekgyu
- MR: Paekkyu

Yi Kyugyŏng (Korean: 이규경; Hanja: 李圭景; 1788 – year of death unknown) was a Silhak scholar in the Joseon period from the late 18th century to the mid-19th century who succeeded the accomplishments of Silhak and sought erudition. He was born in Jeonju and his courtesy name was Paekkyu (伯揆). His pen name is Oju (오주; 五洲) or Soun'gŏsa (소운거사; 嘯雲居士).

Yi dedicated his life to writing his own books and reading many books from Korea and China. He was deeply interested in studying astronomy, geography, history, literature, culture, religion, paintings, calligraphy, and customs while remaining out of public office. In particular, he published Oju yŏnmun changjŏn san'go which was received to be the best encyclopedia in the 19th century. Consistent with analysis and dialectics, his style of writing and academic characteristics gave birth to works of detailed scientific techniques that were distinguished from other works of the Joseon dynasty, contributing to an expansion in the scope of Silhak to natural history.

== Family background ==
Yi's studies was influenced by his ancestors. His grandfather, Yi Deokmu, was scholarly and well-versed in the Hundred Schools of Thought. His writings created a new style to describe the heart of the people and social conditions in detail. When King Jeongjo opened the Kyujanggak, he appointed well-known scholars whose duties were to compile, proofread and transcribe books, such as Geomseogwan (檢書官). Yi Deokmu was called the Four Geomseo along with Yu Deuk-gong, Pak Chega (박제가; 朴齊家) and Seo Isu (서이수; 徐理修). Yi won the King’s favor. He participated whenever there were letters to compile at Kyujanggak. His son, Yi Gwanggyu, succeeded his father as a Geomseo, serving at Kyujanggak for a long time. Yi Kyugyŏng was influenced by such family tradition and the Silhak of the Qing dynasty that prevailed at that time.

=== Silhak scholar ===
The late Joseon dynasty, during which Yi Kyugyŏng lived, saw the development of commerce and handicrafts as the agricultural productivity increased. Active in the mid-19th century, he sought erudition as a new turning point from Neo-Confucianism academic method “Gewu Zhizhi (格物致知)”, which was an epistemological concept of Confucianism that dominated the then society, and academia in the period of transition from agricultural to industrial society. Studying and recognizing objects with Neo-Confucian academic methodology inevitably led to difficulties in obtaining specific information on existing objects and interpreting various phenomena. In particular, as the state-led mining development project broadened to the private sector after the mid-18th century. The boundaries of society-led industries started expanding in all areas, and society posed the need to transition the recognition standard of the subjects who recognize social issues. Among them, the pursuit of encyclopedia-based studying and the borrowing of the erudite academic method were of interest to Silhak scholars who tried to suggest various academic turning points, noting the changing social conditions at the time. Yi defined his academic identity as erudition and continued. His erudition did not simply mean “having extensive knowledge”. He tried to recognize objects and issues accurately and firmly in many ways

== Achievements ==
=== Characteristics of Yi Kyugyŏng's studies ===
Yi inherited numerous books and reading notes accumulated by his grandfather and father. Based on them, he pioneered a wider academic world. From what is now known, there are traces of continuous writing from 1800 to 1855. In particular, his book Oju yŏnmun changjŏn san'go is a 50-year-long masterpiece which was amended and supplemented until just before his final breath. It represents the early and mid-19th century books.

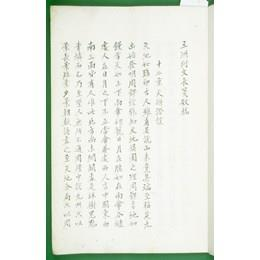
Oju yŏnmun changjŏn san'go

=== Oju yŏnmun changjŏn san'go ===
The list of Yi's books shows that he had a wide range of interests and concentrated on editing practical books. Of course, even though he did not personally experience and experiment in various fields, but he did organize the books of Silhak for future generations to use which were in fashion in the early Joseon dynasty. He also organized professional technical books of the Ming and Qing Dynasties, and books written by western missionaries. By doing so, he made great achievements in providing the basis for information aggregation and scientific analysis methods.

=== Literature ===
Yi left nearly twenty books including his masterpiece Oju yŏnmun changjŏn san'go. This focused on the compiling of practical books rather than on the traditional Confusianism, and gathered the knowledge of those days in encyclopedia style.

=== Scientific achievements ===
- Shim-Yubang (心遊方), a book on ships of the east and the west
- Oju-Seojong (五洲書種), a schematic of the tactics of attacking with fire and inundation tactics
- Yigadoseoyak (李家圖書約), a collection of illustrations of waterwheels, steamships, wagons and weights and measures
- Gwaksa, Hoeyo (露縣、會要) which contains symptoms and treatment of epidemics
- Baek-Un-Pil which contains measures on agricultural management
- Oju-Seojong-Bakmul-Gobyeon (五洲書種博物攷辦) which summarizes the types, characteristics and refining methods of minerals

=== Humanistic and sociological achievements ===
- Shiga-Jeomdeung (詩家點燈), a collection of notes on poets and poetry from Joseon and China
- Namgyoyeokgo (南交繹考), a record of trade between Joseon and Annam (Vietnam)
- Bojegiseo (普濟奇書), a collection of records of famine reliefs

== Legacy ==
Yi is regarded as an erudite scholar who flourished Silhak in the late Joseon dynasty Silhak by succeeding Silhak accomplished by his grandfather Yi Deokmu, without holding a government post during his lifetime. He compiled various specialized books, including Oju yŏnmun changjŏn san'go, known as the best encyclopedia of the 19th century. He opened up the horizons of Korean erudition by organizing information on all creation of those days in an encyclopedia. It is meaningful in that it set an example of the erudite study of ancient documents by freely studying, categorizing and describing objects in a vast but systematic manner, freeing from the existing Neo-Confucian reasoning method. The new knowledge and innovative ideas that Yi suggested so that they could be widely communicated to objects of all ages and countries seem to have been seriously and desperately accepted by early enlightenment leaders.
