= Korean cold noodles =

Korean cold noodles may refer to:

- Naengmyeon

- Bibim-naengmyeon

- Bibim-guksu
