= Sōmen =

Type of East Asian noodles

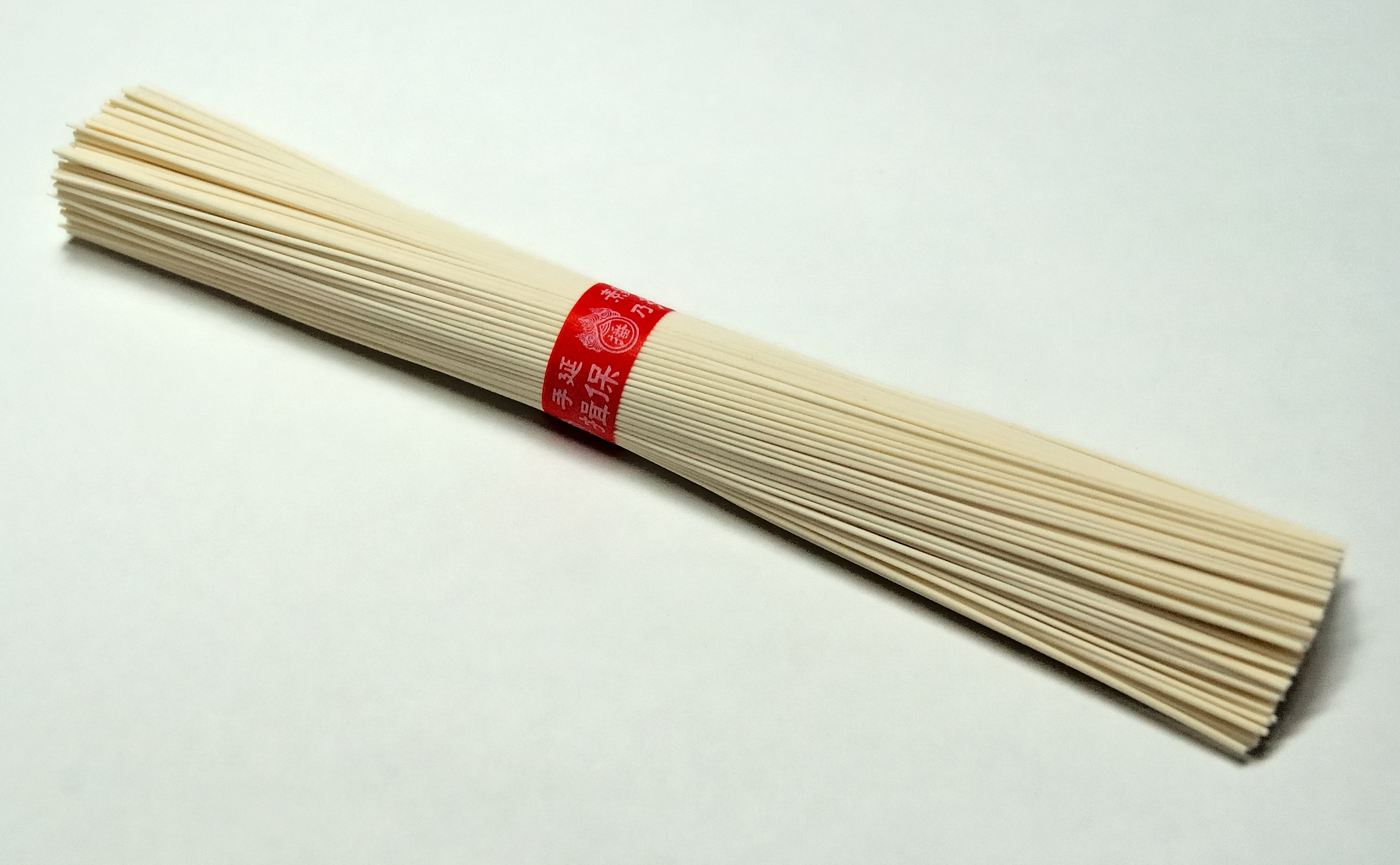
- Alternative names: Somyeon; sùmiàn; Soomin
- Type: Noodles
- Place of origin: China
- Region or state: East Asia
- Main ingredients: Wheat flour

Regional names

Historical name
- Chinese: 索麵
- Literal meaning: rope noodle
Transcriptions
Middle Chinese
- Middle Chinese: /sɑk̚.men^{H}/

Chinese name
- Traditional Chinese: 素麵
- Simplified Chinese: 素面
- Literal meaning: white noodle
Transcriptions
Standard Mandarin
- Hanyu Pinyin: sùmiàn
- Wade–Giles: su^{4}-mien^{4}

Korean name
- Hangul: 소면
- Hanja: 素麵
Transcriptions
- Revised Romanization: somyeon
- McCune–Reischauer: somyŏn

Japanese name
- Kanji: 素麺
- Kana: そうめん
Transcriptions
- Revised Hepburn: sōmen

Sōmen (Japanese: 素麺), somyeon (Korean: 소면; Hanja: 素麵), sùmiàn (Chinese: 素麵) or soomin (Okinawan: 素麺) is a very thin noodle made of wheat flour, less than 1.3 mm in diameter. The noodles are used extensively in East Asian cuisines. Japanese sōmen is made by stretching the dough with vegetable oil, forming thin strands that are then air dried for later use. This is distinct from a similar thin noodle, hiyamugi, which is knife-cut.

In Japan, sōmen is usually served cold with a light dipping sauce called tsuyu. South Korean somyeon may be eaten in hot or cold noodle soups. Sōmen is typically high in sodium.

Other names are nyūmen (煮麺) in Japanese, for a version served warm in soup, and the Chinese name guàmiàn (Chinese: 掛麵), which can be further classified into lóngxū (Chinese: 龍鬚; lit. 'Dragon Whiskers') for the variant with long and thin strands and fèngwei (Chinese: 鳳尾; lit. 'Phoenix Tail') for the variant with flat and broad strands.

== History ==
The earliest record for what would later be sōmen dates back to the Tang dynasty in 618-907 China. Around that time, the Japanese Imperial Court in Nara brought in some knotted pastry from China which they called sakubei/索餅 (most likely Chinese mahua/麻花). Sakubei later evolved into somen first in modern-day Sakurai, Nara's Miwa district during the Heian Period and then evolved to become high-class Japanese cuisine served to emperors and nobles. This transition from the knotted pastry (sakubei) to the thin noodle form we know today occurred primarily during the Kamakura period (1185–1333). This evolution was catalyzed by two major factors: the introduction of stone mills (ishiusu) by Zen Buddhist monks, which allowed for the production of fine wheat flour, and the development of the hand-stretching technique (tenobe) using vegetable oil. The oil prevented the dough from drying out, enabling it to be stretched into much thinner, delicate strands. By the late 14th century, the term somen (素麺) appeared in historical records such as the Kakaisho, marking its distinction from its predecessor.

== East Asian cuisines ==
=== Japan ===
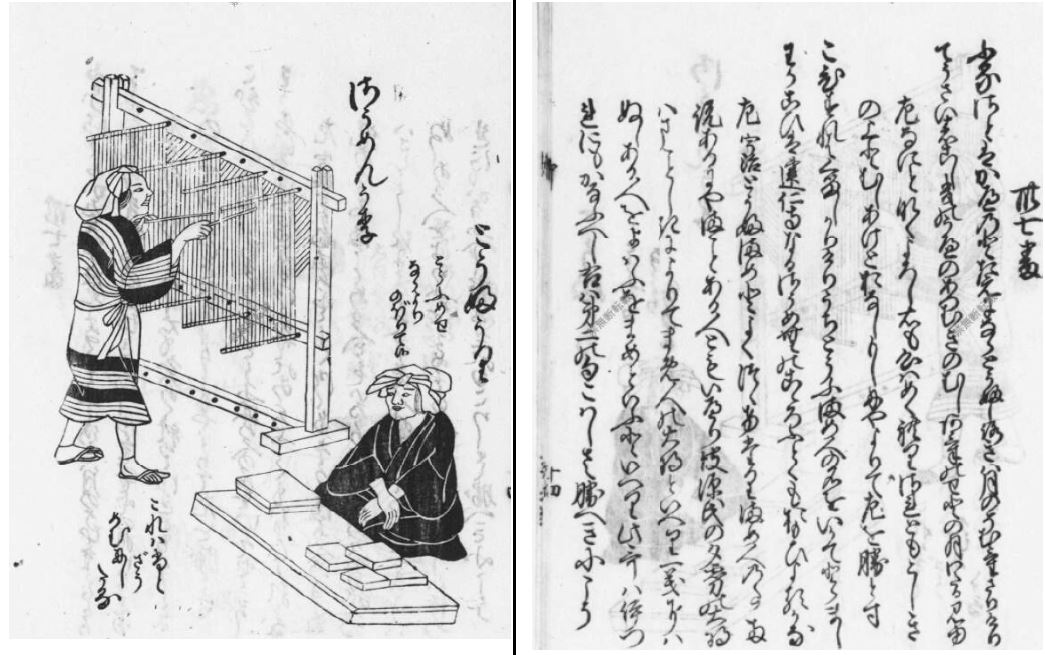
Illustration of a tofu seller (right) and a sōmen seller (left) by Tosa Mitsunobu, from the Songs of the Seventy-one Craftsmen (七十一番職人歌合 Shichijūichi-ban Shokunin Uta-awase), a poetry anthology written around 1500

Sōmen are usually served cold with a light flavored dipping sauce or tsuyu. The tsuyu is usually a katsuobushi-based sauce that can be flavored with Japanese bunching onion, ginger, or myoga. In the summer, sōmen chilled with ice is a popular meal to help stay cool.

Sōmen served in hot soup is usually called nyūmen and eaten in the winter, just like soba or udon are.

Some restaurants offer nagashi-sōmen (流しそうめん flowing noodles) in the summer. The noodles are placed in a long flume of bamboo across the length of the restaurant. The flume carries clear, ice-cold water. As the sōmen pass by, diners pluck them out with their chopsticks and dip them in tsuyu. Catching the noodles requires a fair amount of dexterity, but the noodles that are not caught by the time they get to the end usually are not eaten, so diners are pressured to catch as much as they can. A few luxury establishments put their sōmen in real streams so that diners can enjoy their meal in a beautiful garden setting. Machines have been designed to simulate this experience at home.

In Okinawan cuisine, Soomin is used in stir fry such as Sōmin Chanpurū and Abura zoomïn.

Sōmen salad is usually served cold with noodles, the vinegar-based sauce, and the garnish. Some recipes include chicken broth, lemon juice, or sesame oil for mixing in the broth. The variety of garnish ranges from shredded lettuce, scallions, sesame seeds, slivered char siu or ham to scrambled eggs.

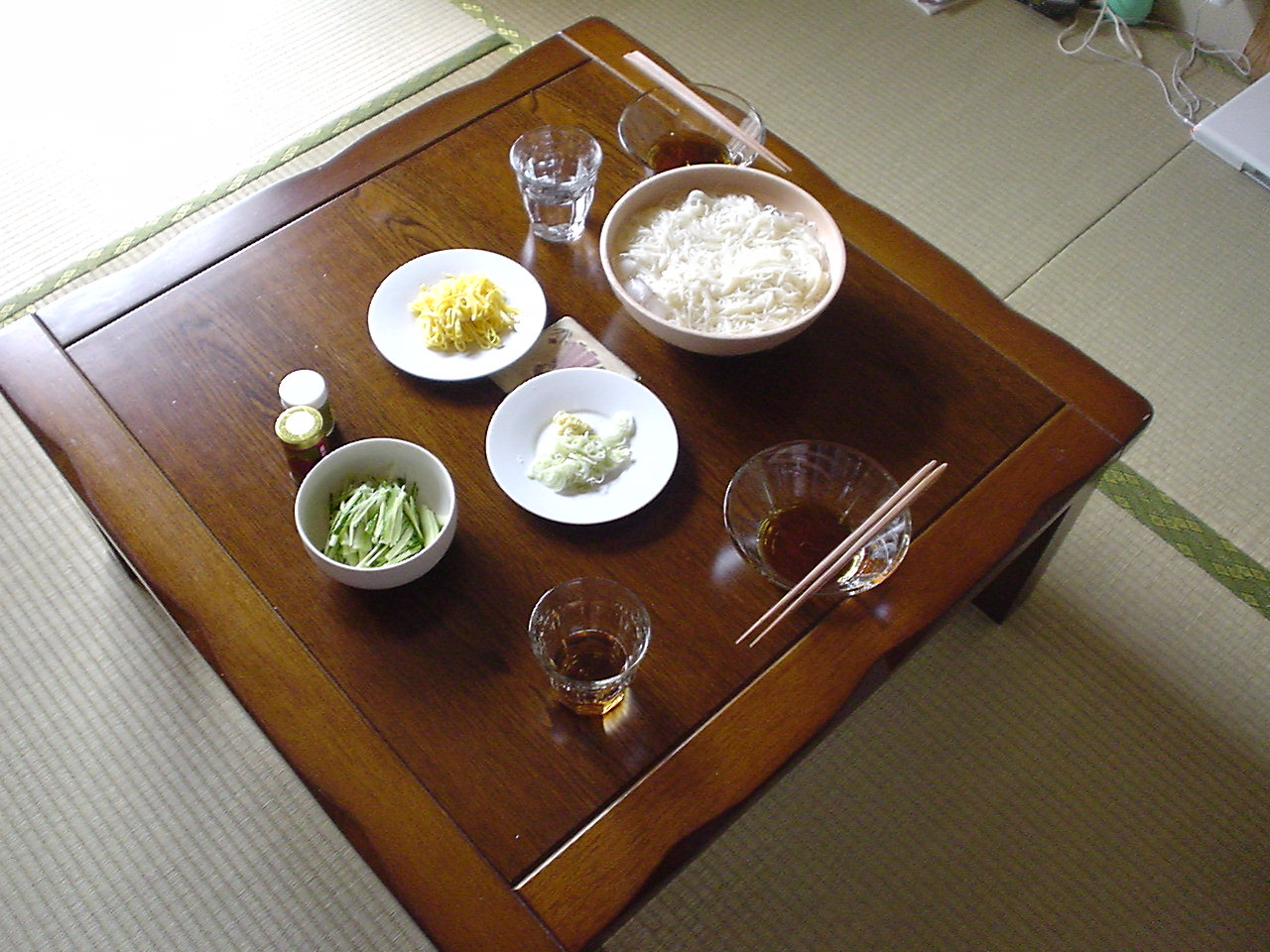
Sōmen (in large white bowl at upper-right) with assorted toppings

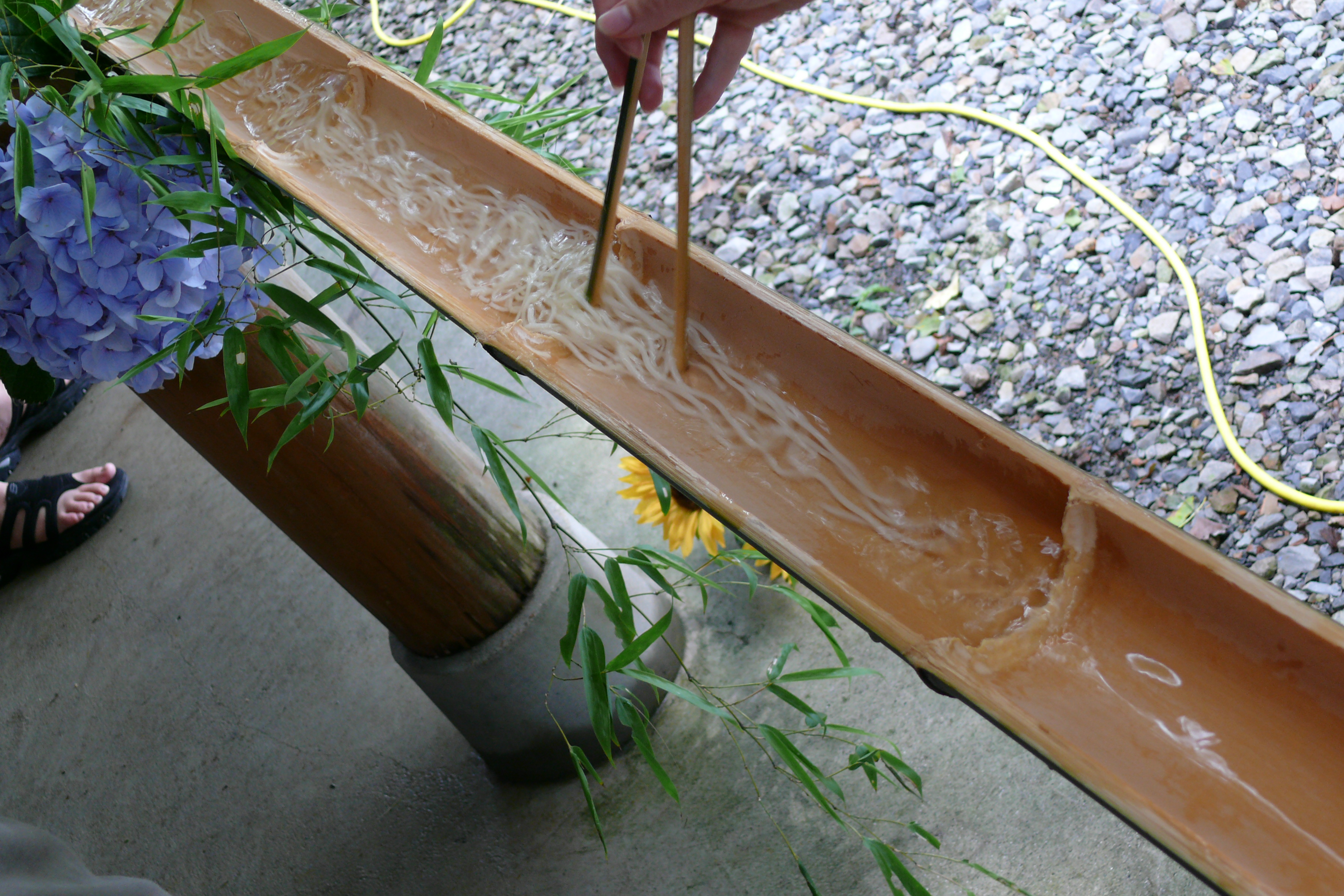
Nagashi-sōmen

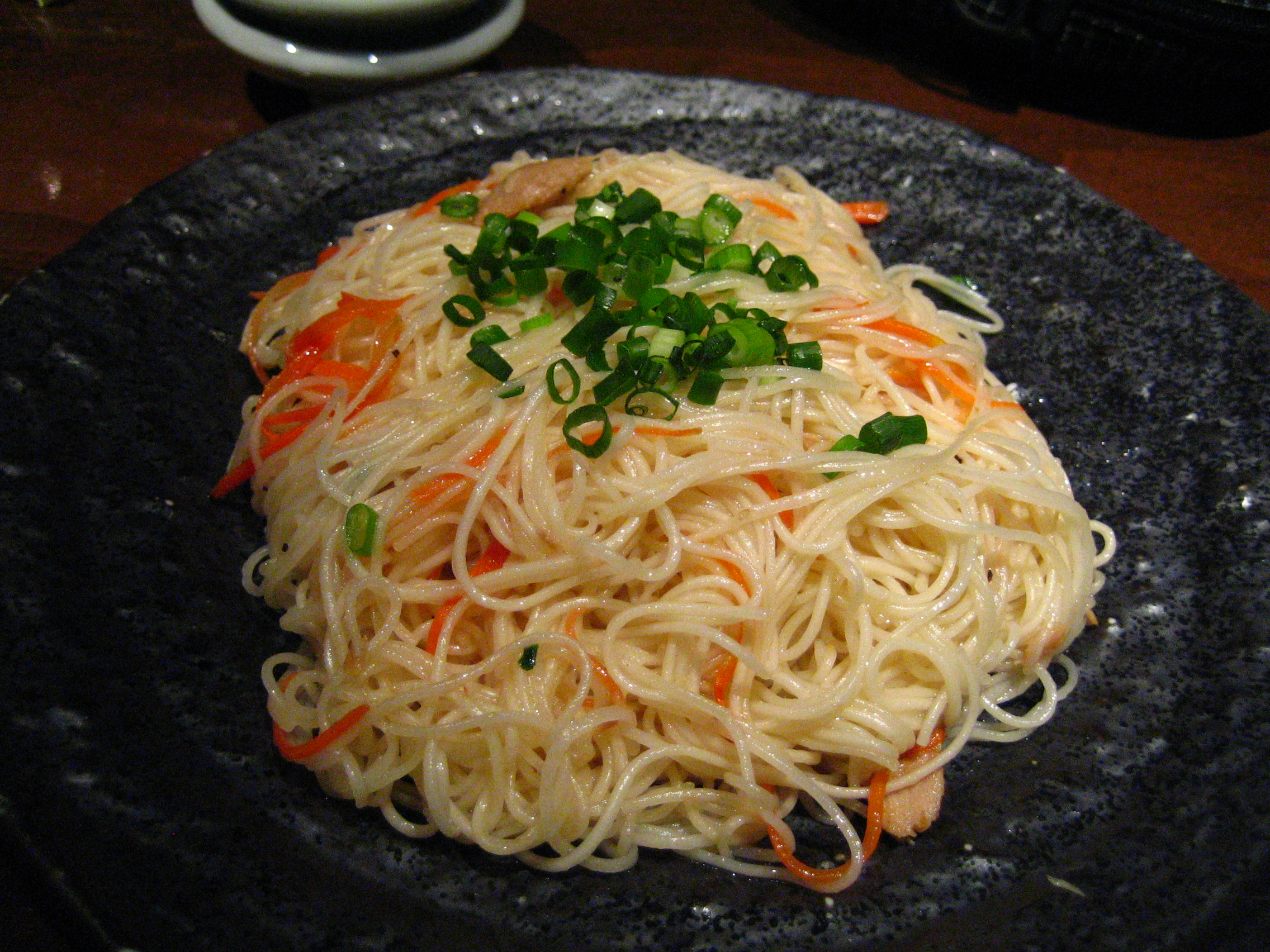
Sōmin Chanpurū

=== Korea ===
In Korean cuisine, somyeon is used in hot and cold noodles soups such as janchi-guksu (banquet noodles) and kong-guksu (noodles in cold soybean soup), as well as soupless noodle dishes such as bibim-guksu (mixed noodles). It is often served with spicy anju (food that accompanies alcoholic drink) such as golbaengi-muchim (moon snail salad).

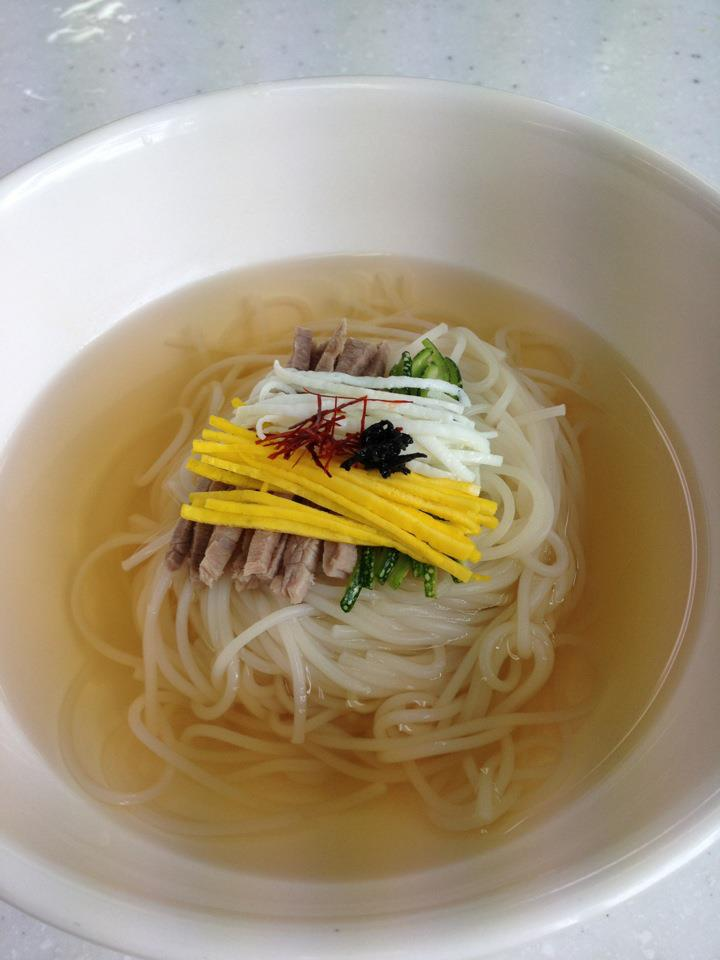
Janchi-guksu

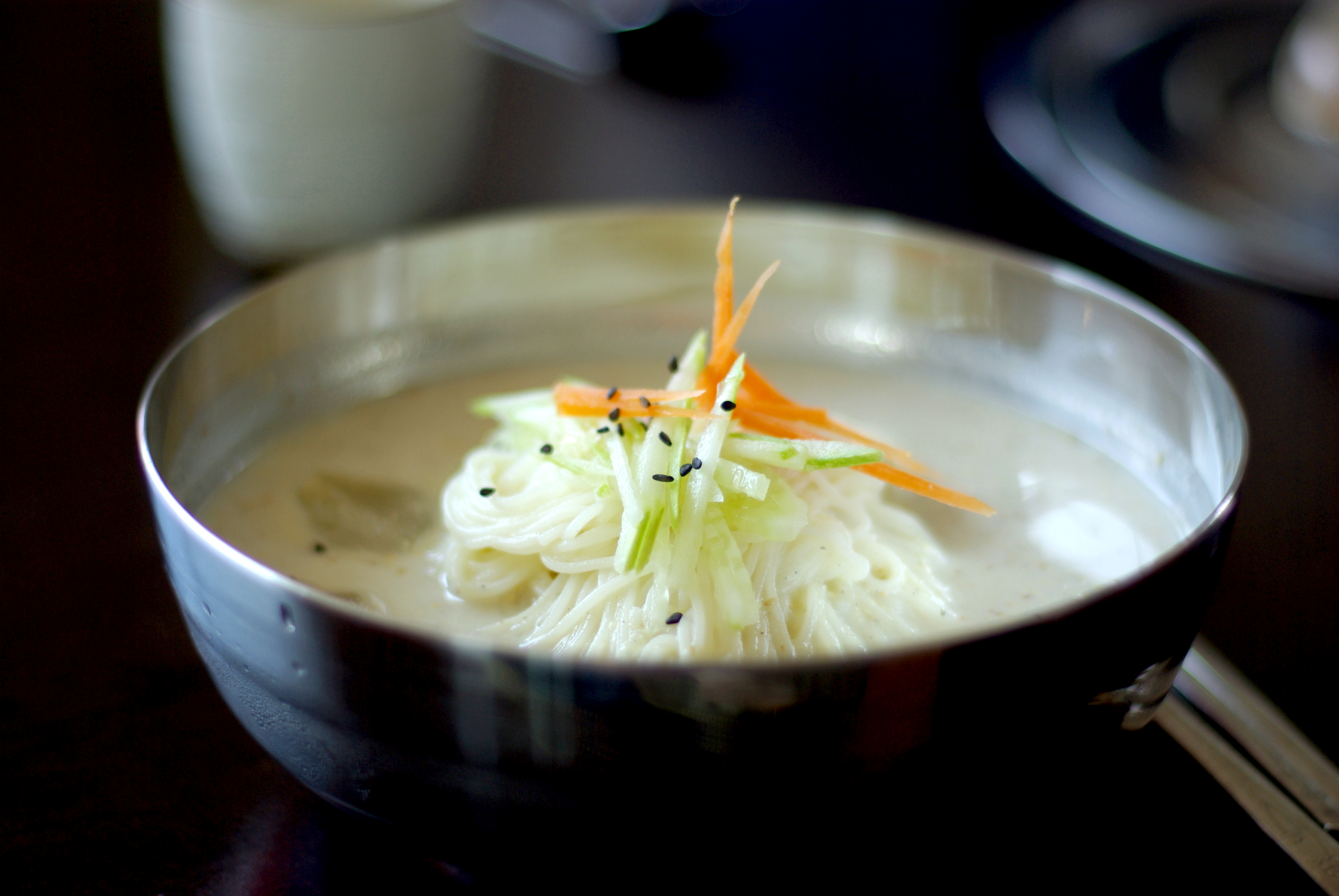
Kong-guksu

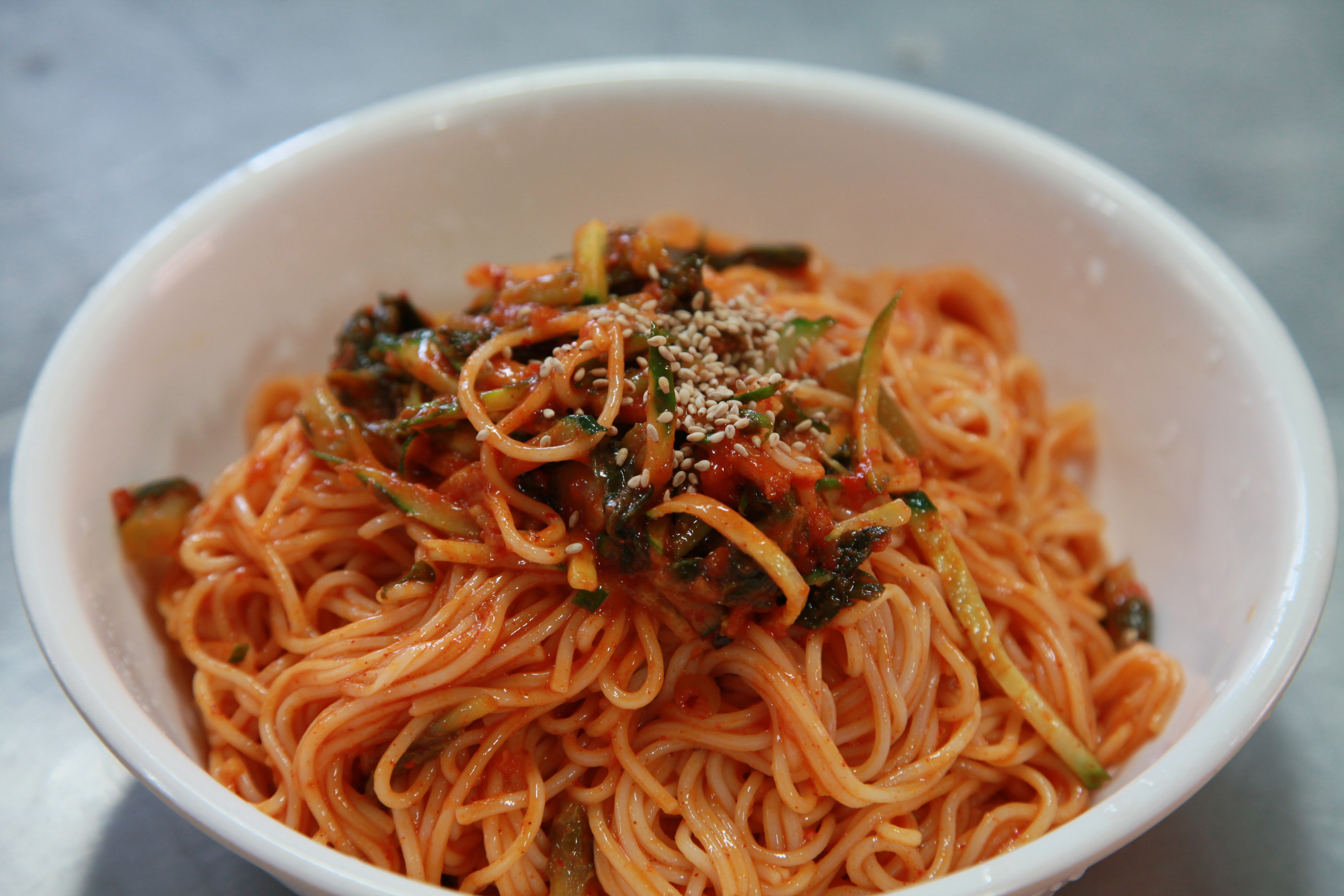
Bibim-guksu

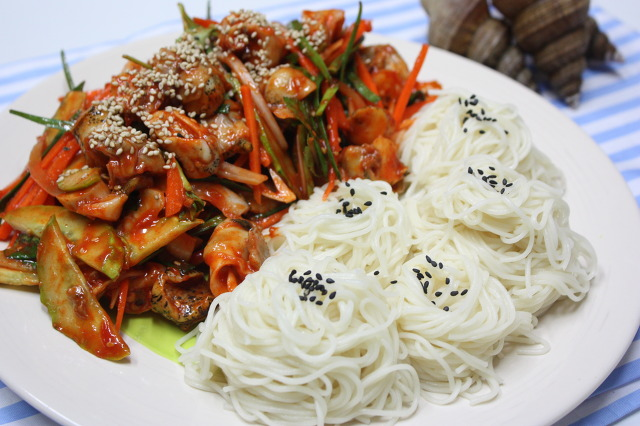
Golbaengi-muchim served with boiled somyeon

== Gallery ==
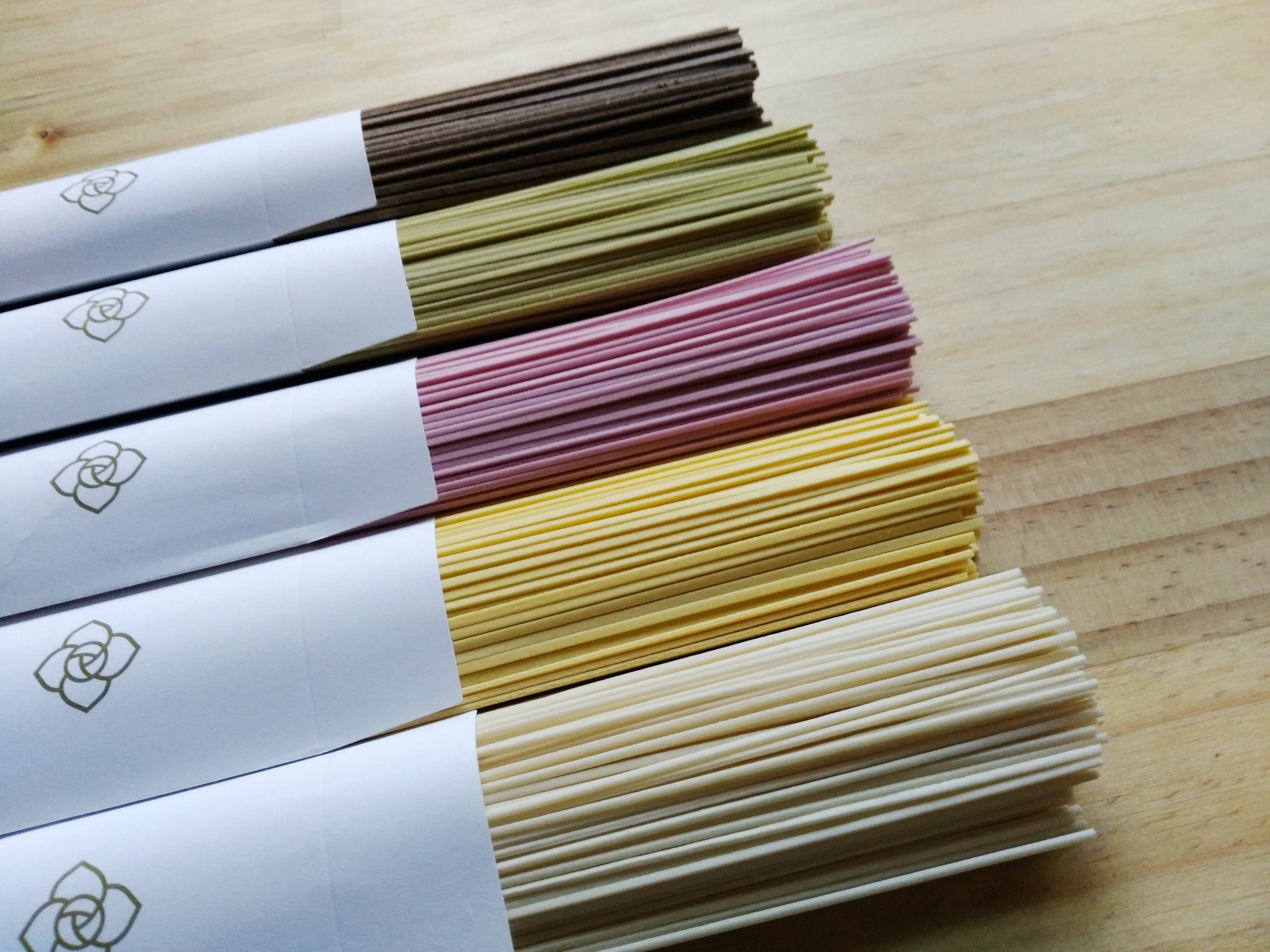
Five-colour somyeon

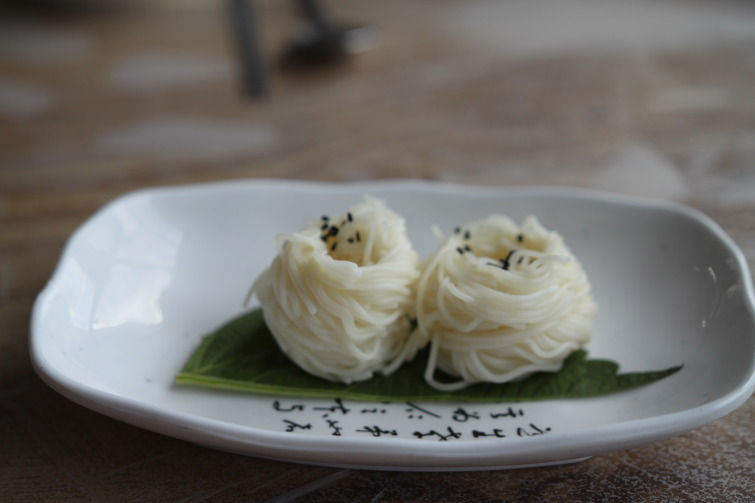
Boiled somyeon

== See also ==
- Capellini - Italian pasta with similar thinness
- Hiyashi chūka
- Sōmen salad
