= Myeon =

Myeon may refer to

- Korean noodles
- Myeon (administrative division) in North Korea and South Korea
