= Kalguksu =

Korean noodle dish

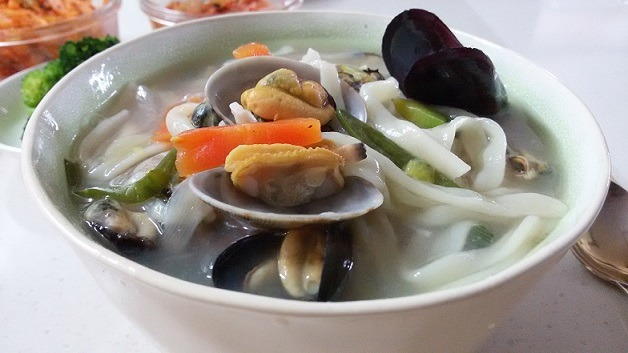
- Haemul-kal-guksu (seafood noodle soup)
- Alternative names: Noodle soup
- Type: Guksu
- Place of origin: Korea
- Main ingredients: Noodles (wheat flour, eggs), broth (dried anchovies, shellfish, dasima), vegetables (often aehobak, potatoes, and scallions)
- Variations: Bajirak-kal-guksu

Korean name
- Hangul: 칼국수
- RR: kalguksu
- MR: k'alguksu
- IPA: [kʰal.ɡuk̚.s͈u]

Kalguksu (Korean: 칼국수; lit. 'knife noodles') is a Korean noodle dish consisting of handmade, knife-cut wheat flour noodles served in a large bowl with broth and other ingredients. It is traditionally considered a seasonal food, consumed most often in summer. Its name comes from the fact that the noodles are not extruded, pulled, or spun, but cut.

== History ==
The record of noodles can be found in documents of the Goryeo era, but the descriptions are vague and the nature of the noodles isn't clear. In the 12th century document Goryeo dogyeong (고려도경; 高麗圖經) it is mentioned that noodles were only eaten on special occasions, as wheat flour was very expensive, being imported from China. A cooking description can be found in a later document, The Best New Cooking Methods of Joseon (조선무쌍신식요리제법; 朝鮮無雙新式料理製法), written in 1924. In the 1934 book Simple Joseon Cooking, the recipe calls for the noodles to be boiled and rinsed in cold water before adding broth and garnish, a method that differs from the modern version of boiling the noodles together with the broth.

== Preparation and serving ==
The noodles are made with dough from wheat flour and eggs, and sometimes ground bean powder is added for texture. The dough is let to breathe, then rolled out thinly and cut in long strips. The broth for kalguksu is usually made with dried anchovies, shellfish, and kelp. Sometimes chicken broth would be used. In order to obtain a rich flavor, the ingredients are simmered for many hours. The noodles and various vegetables, most often Korean zucchini, potatoes, carrots and scallions are added and boiled together. Usually seasoned with salt, the noodles are served with garnish of choice.

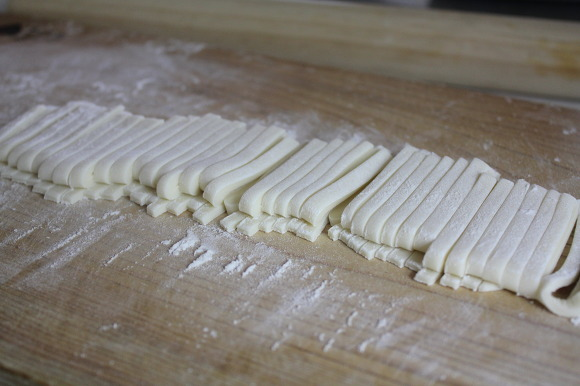
Hand-cut kalguksu noodles

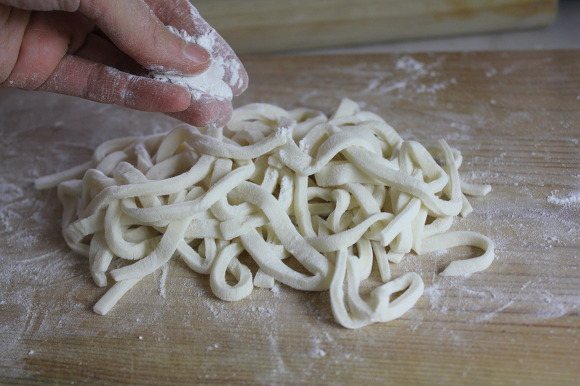
Hand-cut kalguksu noodles

== Varieties ==
- Jemul kalguksu (제물칼국수): Noodles are put to a boil with other ingredients in broth, instead of being added later. Both the noodles and broth gain a thick texture.
- Ssuk kalguksu (쑥칼국수): Mugwort is added to the dough when making the noodles. Usually served in anchovy broth.
- Mung bean kalguksu (녹두칼국수): Boiled mung beans are crushed, sieved, and added to the noodle dough.
- Hobak pumpkin kalguksu (호박칼국수): Noodles are cooked with a porridge-like mixture of red beans and rice, and served in a hollowed-out pumpkin. A specialty dish of South Chungcheong Province.
- Perilla seed kalguksu (들깨칼국수): Finely ground perilla seeds are added to the broth. Seasoned with soy sauce and garnished with zucchini and shiitake mushrooms.
- Pheasant and buckwheat kalguksu (꿩메밀 칼국수): Broth is made from pheasant, and noodles from buckwheat flour.
- Pea kalguksu (완두콩칼국수): Peas are boiled and sieved and added to the broth. Seasoned with minced garlic.
- Small octopus kalguksu (밀국낙지칼국수): A small octopus is cooked inside a squash, and later cut to add to the noodles and broth.
- Pine mushroom kalguksu (송이버섯칼국수): Pine mushrooms are sliced and added with other vegetables while boiling. A specialty from the Gangneung region.
- Snail kalguksu (고둥칼국수): Freshwater snails are boiled and ground into a broth, and noodles are added.
- Millet kalguksu (조밥칼국수): A specialty dish from the Andong region, noodles are served with rice made of millet, and ssam. The noodles are made from a mixture of bean powder and flour. The meal is served with a seasoning sauce made from soy sauce, minced garlic, scallions, red chili powder, sesame oil, and sesame salt.
- Andong kalguksu (안동칼국수): Specialty of the Andong region. Ground bean powder is added to the flour when making noodles. The broth is usually made from chicken.
- Suyuk kalguksu (수육칼국수): cooked beef is added in the dish.

== Gallery ==
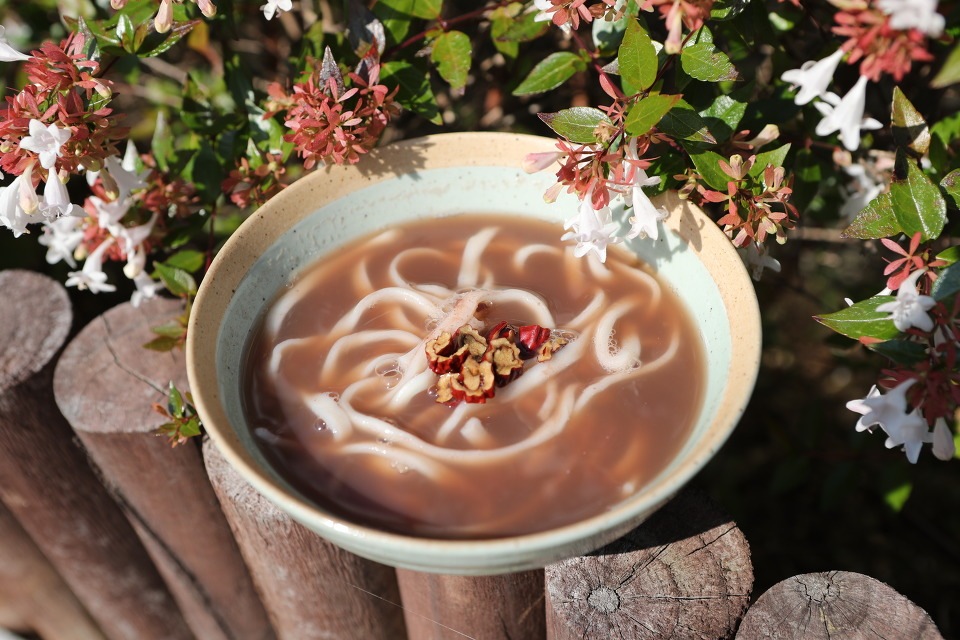
patkalguksu (red bean kalguksu)

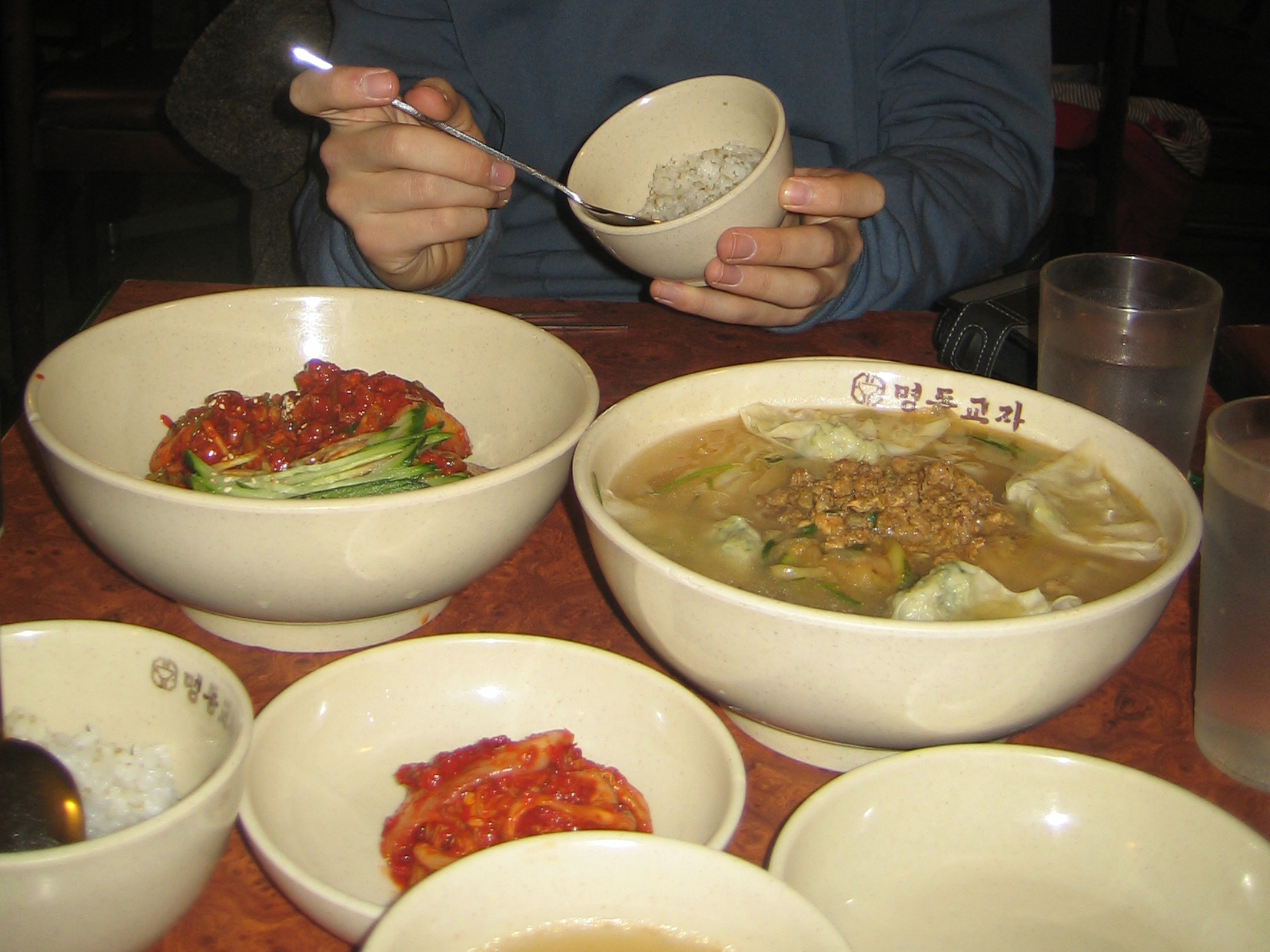
Gogi kalguksu (고기칼국수), a variety made with beef broth and bibim guksu

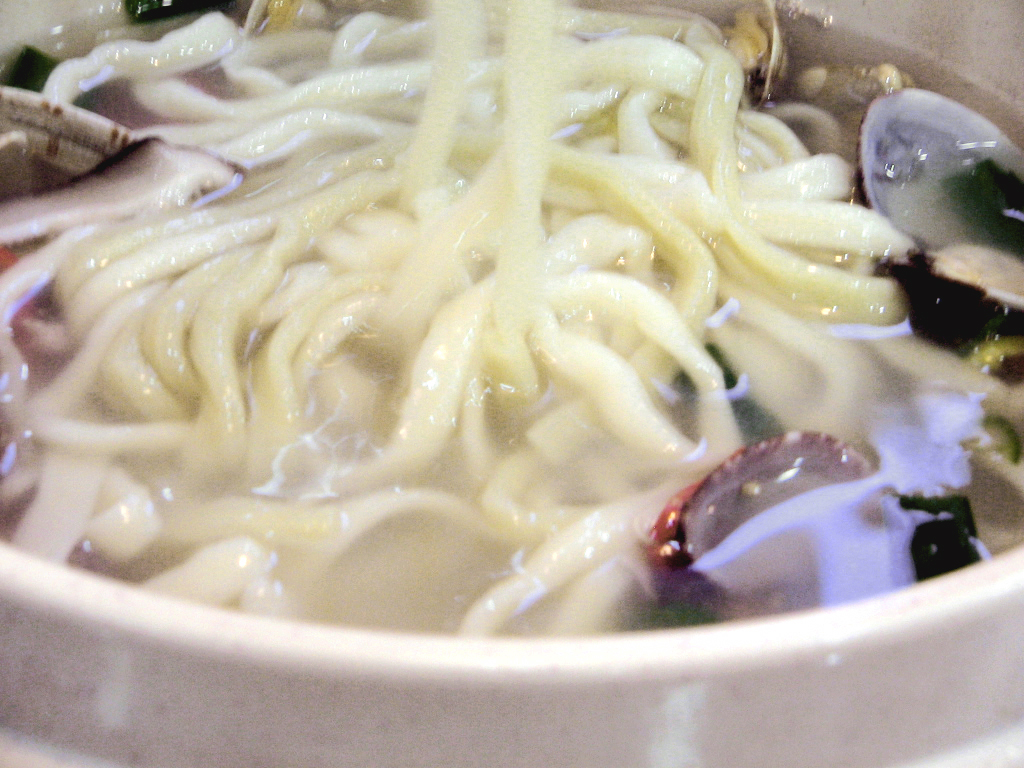
Haemul kalguksu (해물칼국수), a variety of kalguksu made with seafood.

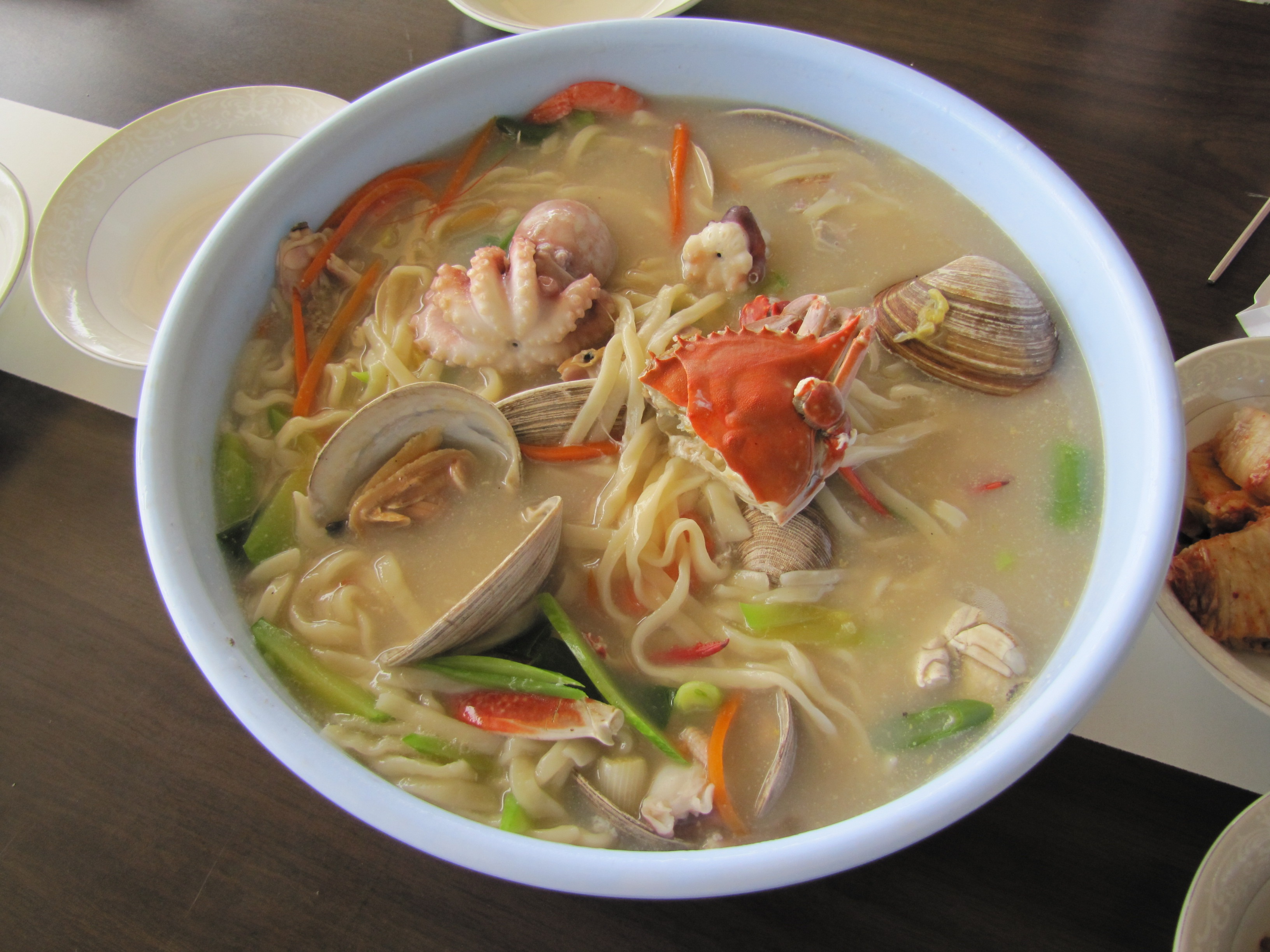
Haemul-kal-guksu (seafood noodle soup)

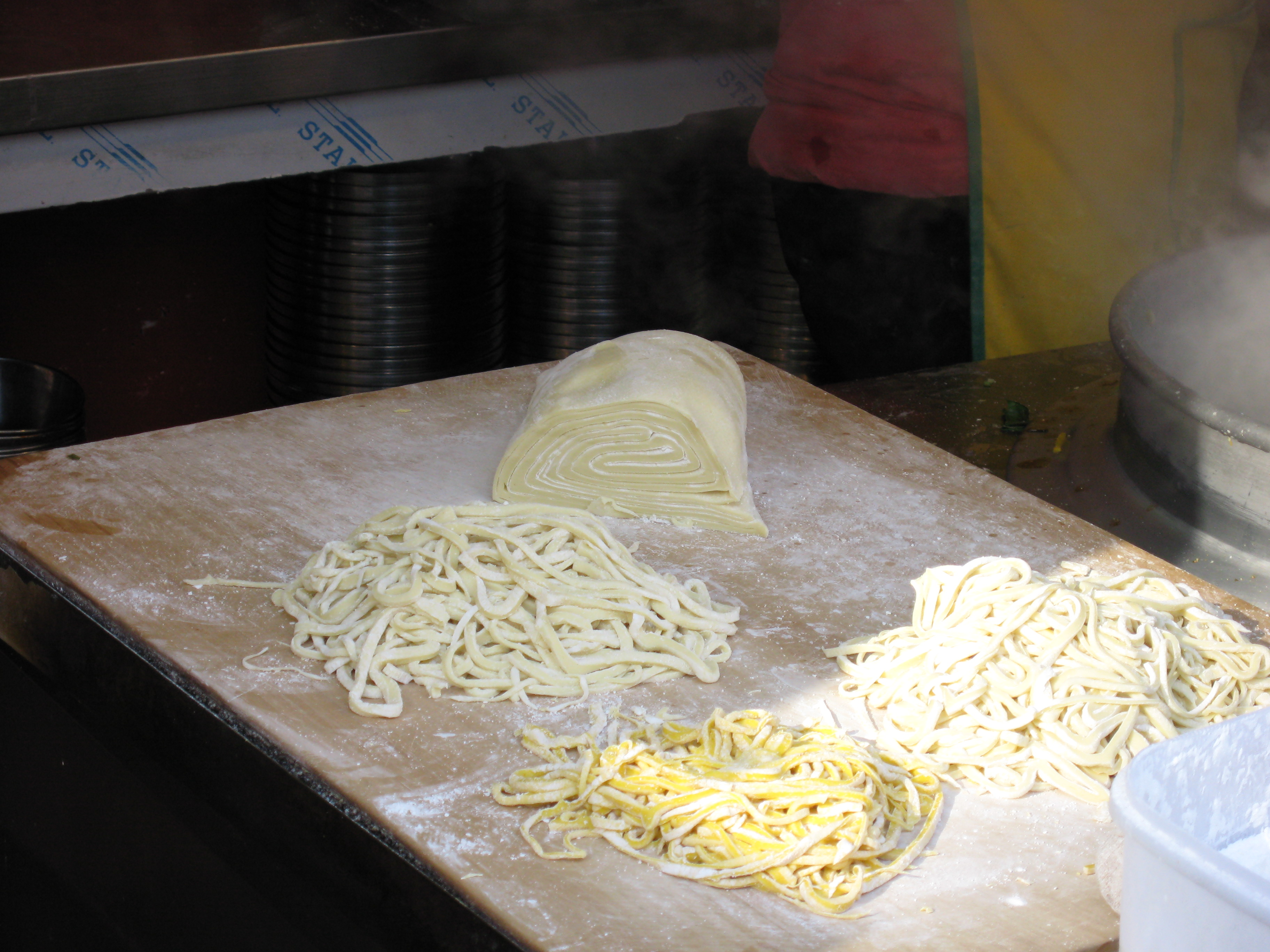
Knife-cut noodles

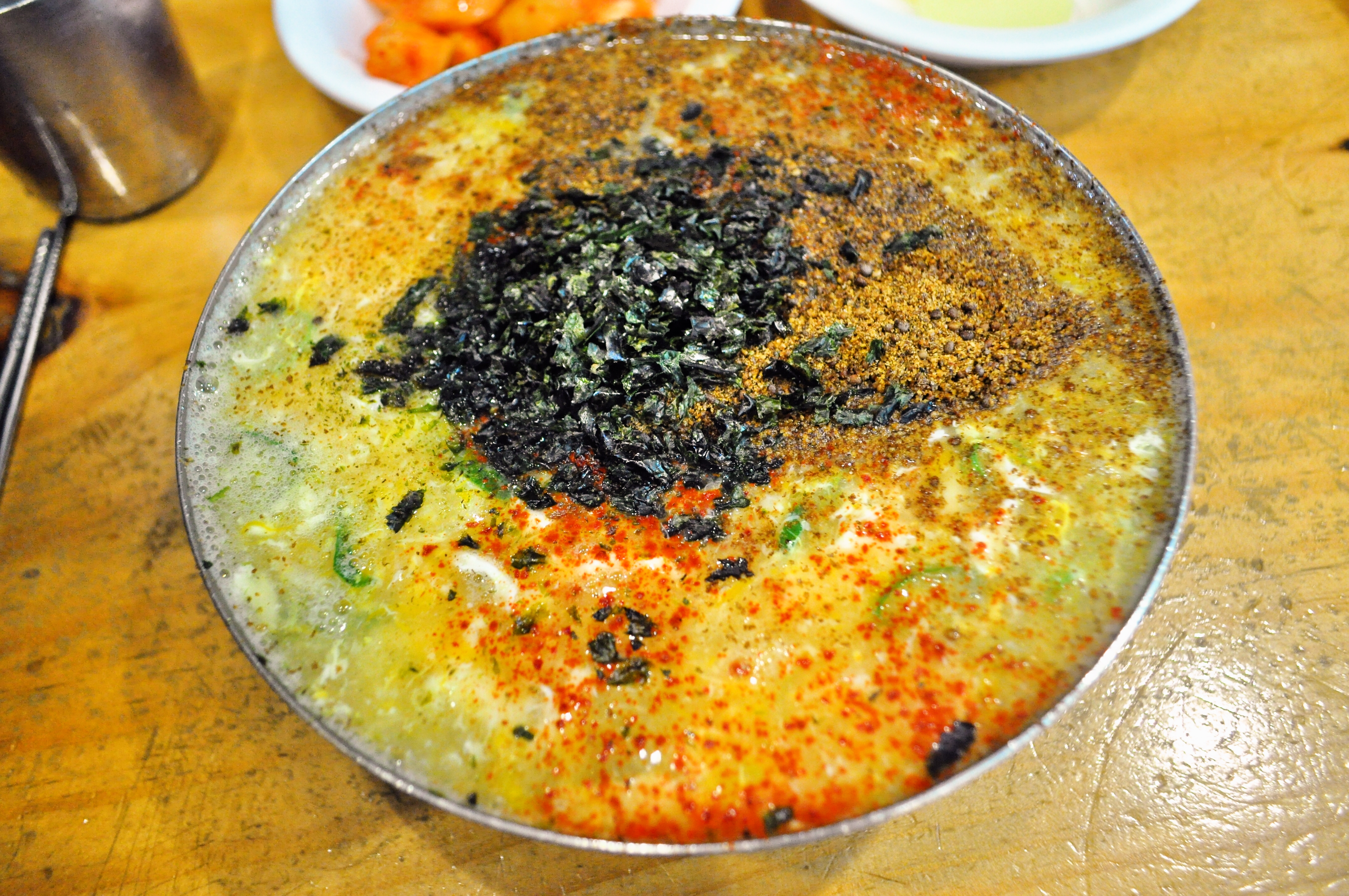
Jeonju's famous kalguksu, The perilla seed powder kalguksu(들깨칼국수)

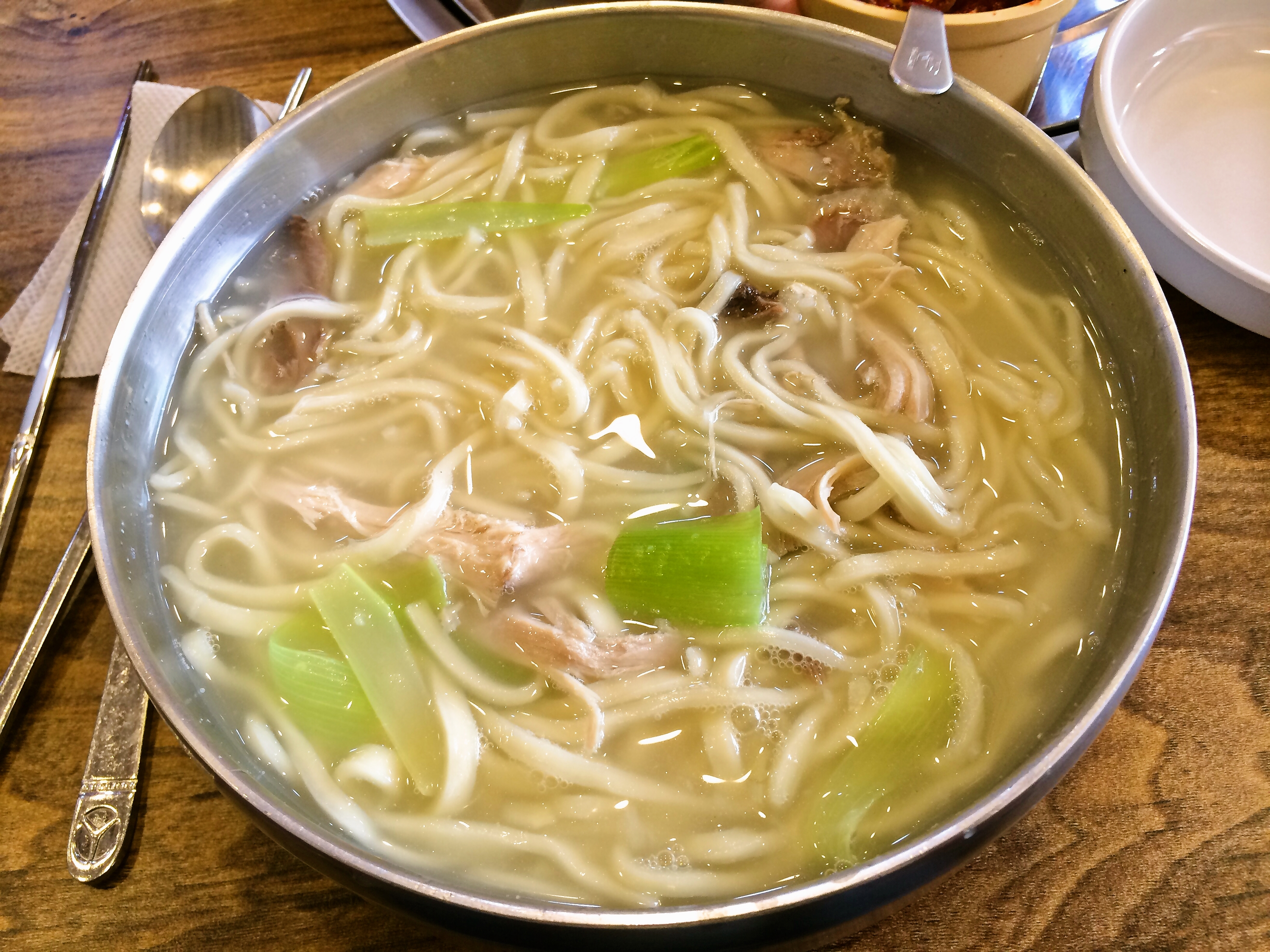
chicken kalguksu

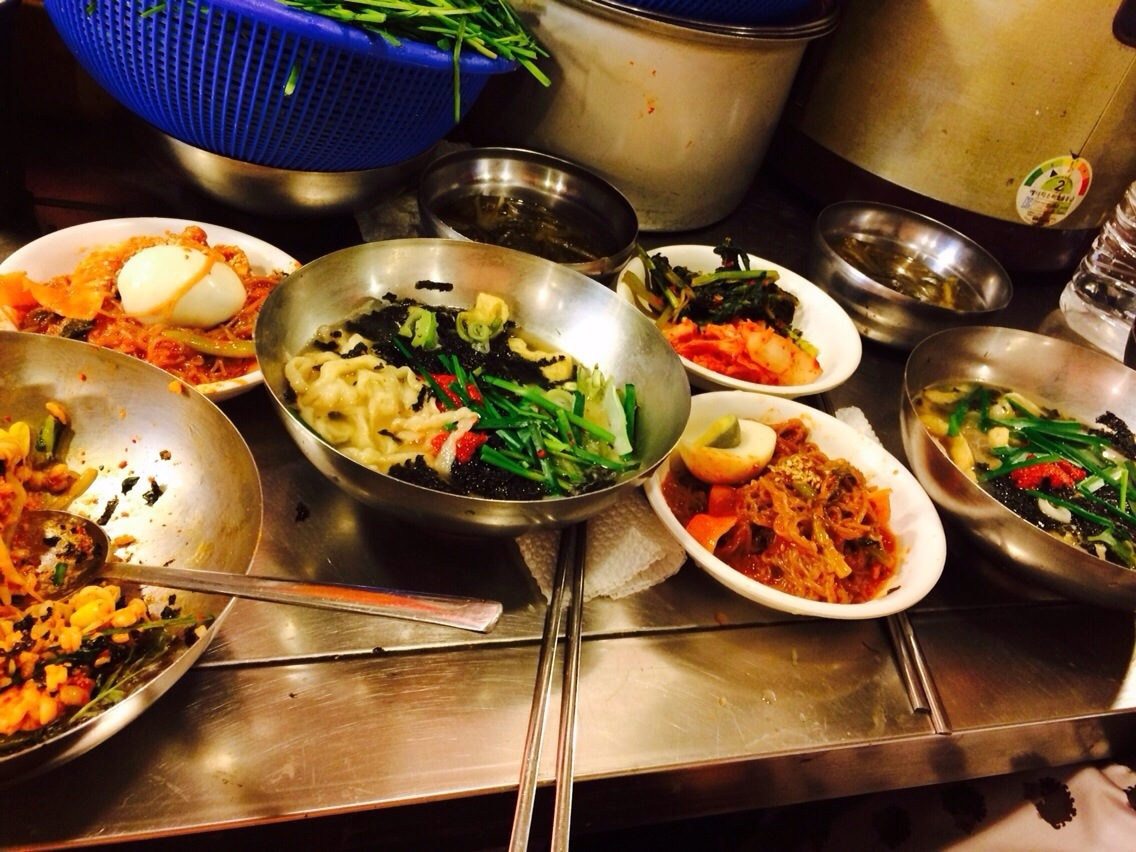
kanguksu of Namdaemoon Market(남대문 시장 칼국수)

== See also ==
- Korean cuisine
- Sujebi
- Makguksu
- Noodle soup
