= Acorn noodle soup =

Korean noodle dish

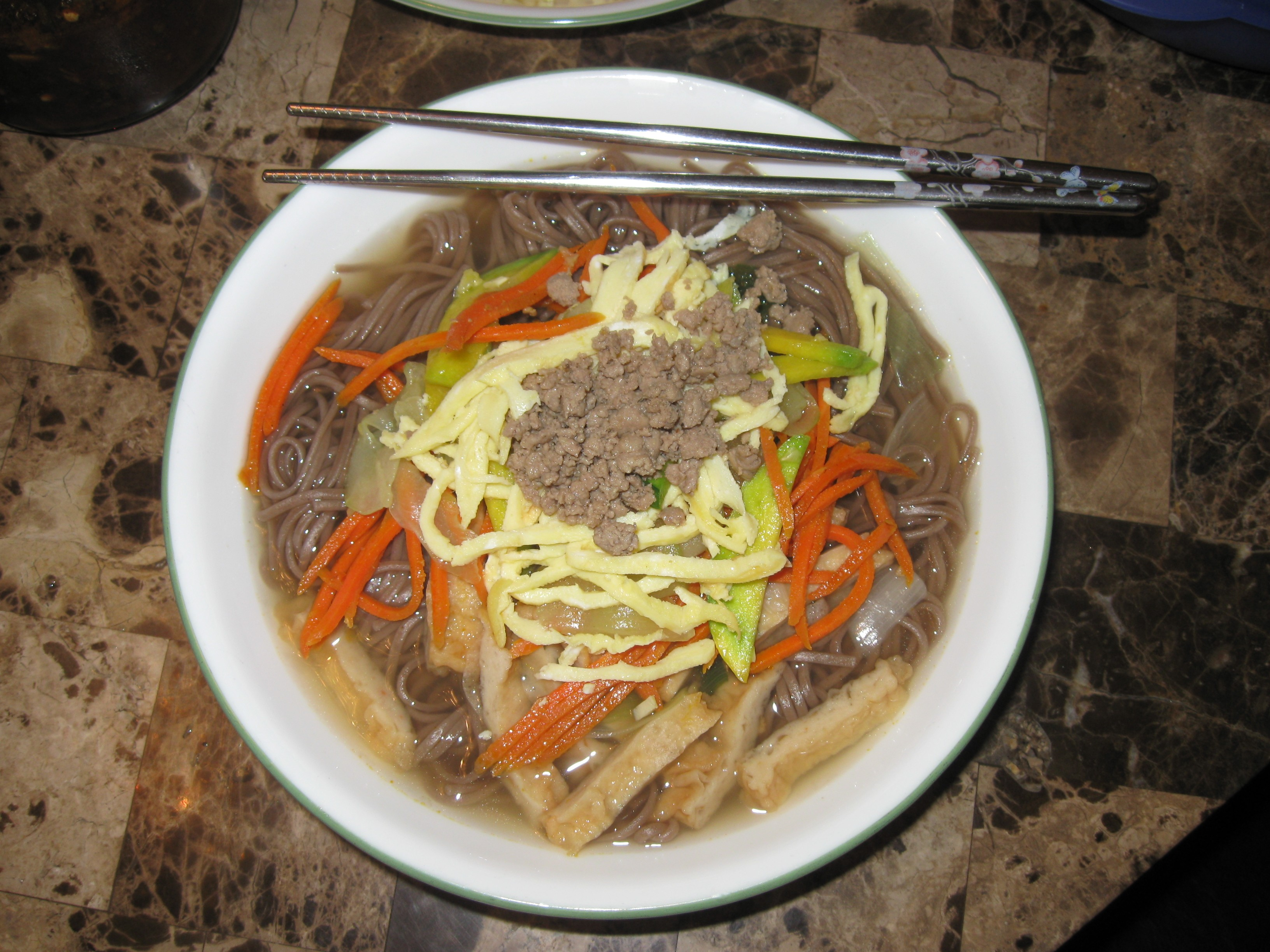
- Korean acorn noodle soup
- Type: Noodle soup
- Place of origin: Korea
- Main ingredients: Acorn flour or starch, grain flour (buckwheat or wheat)

Korean name
- Hangul: 도토리국수
- RR: dotoriguksu
- MR: tot'origuksu
- IPA: to.tʰo.ɾi.ɡuk̚.s͈u

Acorn noodle soup, also called dotoriguksu (Korean: 도토리국수; lit. 'acorn noodle'), is a noodle soup consisting of Korean noodles made from acorn flour or starch, salt, and a combination of grain-based flour (usually buckwheat or wheat).

Acorn noodle soup may be made from acorns collected from red or white oak species and each oak species gives a distinct flavour. Ingredient labels do not list from which type of tree acorns are gathered, most likely owing to the large number of oak species and increasing oak hybridization (especially among white oak varieties), which makes it difficult to recognise and document each type of species.

== Origins ==
Evidence at Neolithic sites such as Amsa-dong in South Korea show acorns were part of the human diet. Acorns contain bitter tannins which would have been leached out to make the acorns edible. They were then ground into flour using a saddle quern and milling stone.

It is unknown exactly where acorn noodles were first produced. However, Ogam village, Korea is well known for a long history of acorn cultivation. The village's location by the Namhangang River and its mountainous climate and landscape is conducive toward large-scale acorn cultivation. The village produces dozens of acorn-based foods, including dotori kalguksoo (acorn knife-cut noodles).

== Varieties ==
There are two varieties of acorn noodles: flour-based soba and starch-based vermicelli.

=== Starch-based ===
Acorn vermicelli noodles or dotori naengmyeon (Korean: 냉면 도토리) are made from acorn starch and some combination of potato, rice, or arrowroot starch, wheat flour, and salt. The dried noodles resemble brown plastic threads about 1—1.2 mm in diameter. Cooked properly and typically eaten cold, acorn-based naengmyeon noodles have high elasticity and a chewy consistency.

=== Flour-based ===
Acorn soba noodles, or, in Korean, dotori guksu (도토리국수), are made from acorn flour and a combination of grain-based flours such as buckwheat and corn, and salt. They are about as thick as spaghetti and are used in hot and cold dishes, such as zaru soba, in which boiled noodles are served cold with a dipping sauce. The Japanese version of these noodles, donguri-men (Japanese:どんぐり), typically has less acorn flour than the original Korean version.

Raw acorn noodles are slightly coarser in cut and texture and more brittle than standard buckwheat soba noodles. Cooked acorn soba noodles are nuttier in flavor and slightly saltier than buckwheat noodles. They contain many antioxidants and could be considered an adaptogenic food.

=== Differences between starch and flour bases ===
A common problem among Korean-manufactured products is that their ingredient labels are often not properly translated. Acorn starch is frequently mislabeled as acorn flour or acorn powder. In reality, acorn starch is essentially highly refined acorn flour, devoid of fiber, fat, and almost all nutrition. While the acorn itself does indeed contain acorn starch, that starch is not highly refined. Acorn starch, in contrast, is extracted from the meat of the kernel using a wet process and then dehydrated. The heart, or germ, of the kernel is removed and used for producing acorn oil, which is comparable in flavor and quality to olive oil. The hull is separated from the kernel meat, and the starch is extracted from the kernel meat. It might be more accurate to use the term "acorn meal", although a meal is a coarser, less refined version of flour.

Both flour- and starch-based acorn noodles are available in upscale Korean markets. A few Japanese markets also carry acorn soba noodles, but in general, acorn soba noodles are difficult to find.

== See also ==
- Dotorimuk

== Bibliography ==
- Use of Acorns for Food in California: Past, Present, Future, David A. Bainbridge Presented at the Symposium on Multiple-use Management of California's Hardwoods, November 12–14, 1986, San Luis Obispo, California.
- Acorns: The Grain That Grows on Trees David Bainbridge, September/October 1984, Mother Earth News.
- Health Benefits of Soba Noodles, from Health Hokkaido, a medical advocacy group.
- McCarthy, Helen 1993 Managing Oaks and the Acorn Crop. In Before the Wilderness: Environmental Management by Native Californians, edited by Thomas C. Blackburn and Kat Anderson. Menlo Park: Ballena Press.
- Katherine J. Meyers, Tedmund J. Swiecki, and Alyson E. Mitchell, Understanding the Native Californian Diet: Identification of Condensed and Hydrolyzable Tannins in Tanoak Acorns (Lithocarpus densiflorus): Journal of Agricultural and Food Chemistry 2006, 54, 7686–7691
- Ortiz, Bev. It Will Live Forever: Traditional Yosemite Indian Acorn Preparation (Berkeley: Heyday Books, 1991)
- Pavlik, Bruce M., Pamela C. Muick, Sharon Johnson, and Marjorie Popper, 1991 Oaks of California. Los Olivos: Cachuma press and the California Oak Foundation.
- University Of Richmond. "Researchers Tackle The Nutty Truth On Acorns And Squirrels." ScienceDaily 26 November 1998. 29 April 2008.
