= Bibim-guksu =

Korean cold, spicy dish made with thin wheat flour noodles

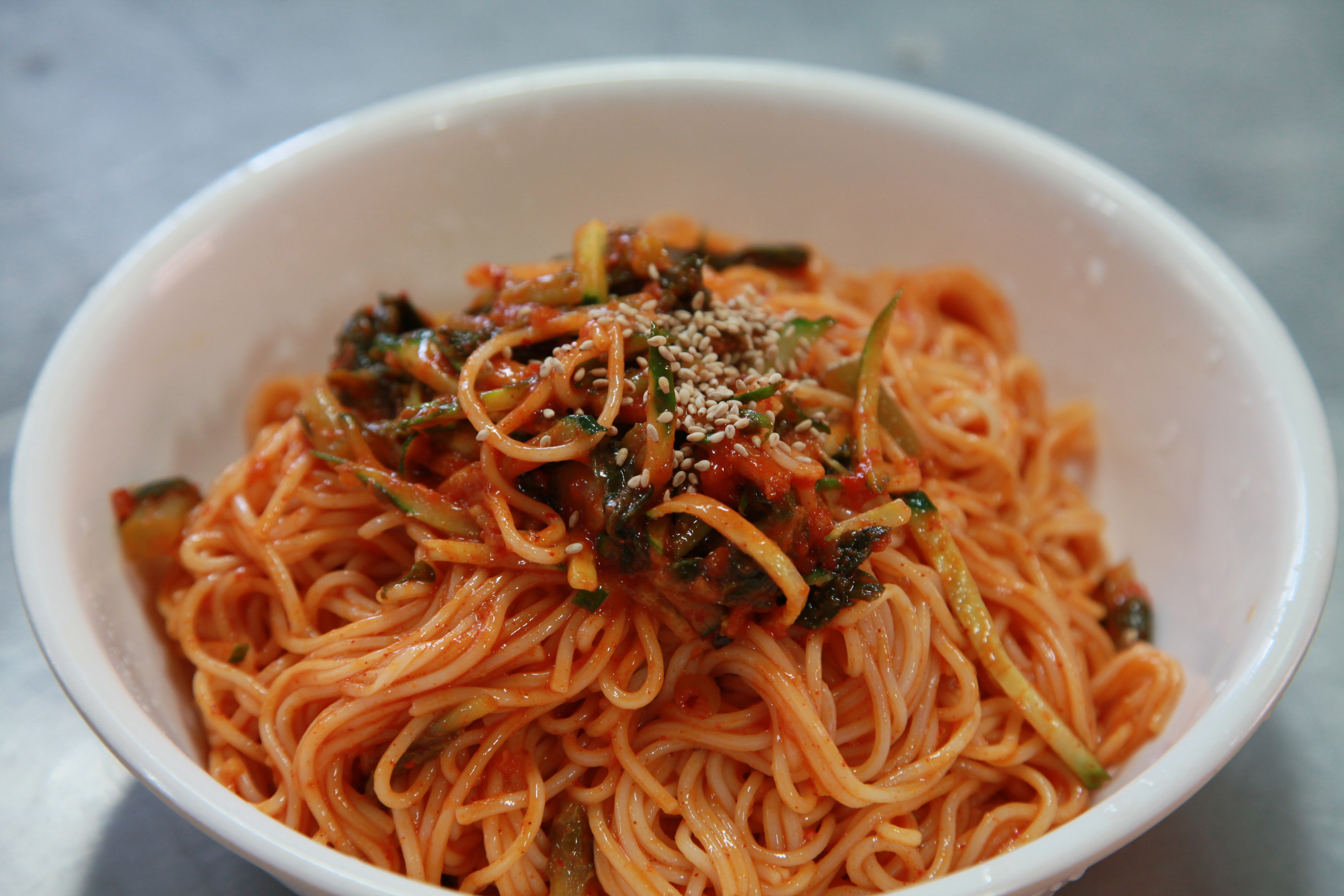
- A bowl of bibim-guksu
- Type: Guksu
- Place of origin: Korea
- Associated cuisine: Korean
- Serving temperature: Cold
- Main ingredients: Somyeon

Korean name
- Hangul: 비빔국수
- RR: bibimguksu
- MR: pibimguksu
- IPA: pi.bim.ɡuk̚.s͈u

Bibim-guksu (비빔국수) or spicy noodles is a cold Korean noodle dish made with very thin wheat flour noodles called somyeon (소면/素麵) with added flavorings. It is one of the most popular traditional noodle dishes in Korean cuisine and especially popular during summer.

== Name ==
Bibim-guksu is also called guksu bibim or goldong myeon, which literally mean "stirred noodles" or "mixed noodles".

== Flavor ==
There are many kinds of cold noodle dishes in South Korea, including one made with cold beef broth; however, spicy cold noodles have historically been appreciated by spice-loving people in Korea and recognized internationally. What makes this dish so distinct from other cold noodle dishes from different cultures is the strong spicy flavor produced from the combination of red pepper powder, gochujang, and minced garlic, along with a sweet-and-sour flavor created by vinegar and sugar. Most spicy cold noodles are prepared with a slight touch of sesame oil to enhance the richness of its flavor.

== Ingredients ==
Typically, bibim-guksu contains stir-fried diced beef, julienned pickled cucumbers, and mushrooms in sesame oil, which are mixed together with the cooked noodles, soy sauce, sesame oil, sesame seeds and sugar. Garnishes placed on top and around the spicy noodles include hard-boiled eggs, pickled mu, dried gim strips, sliced cucumbers, and sometimes sliced Korean pear or tomato.

== See also ==
- Bibimbap
- Naengmyeon
