= Kong-guksu =

Korean noodle dish in soy milk broth

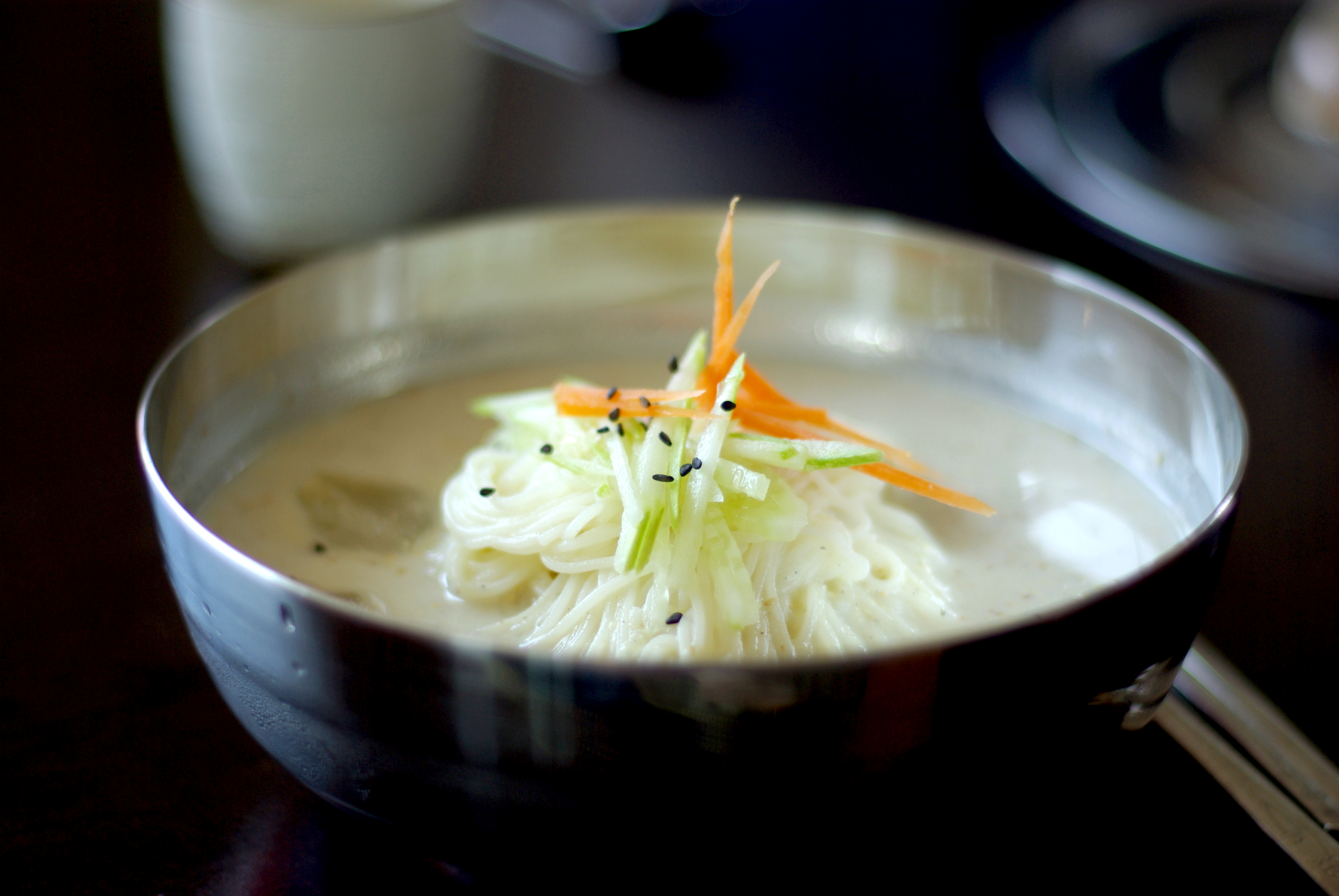
- Alternative names: Noodles in cold soybean soup
- Type: Guksu
- Course: Cold
- Place of origin: Korea
- Main ingredients: Noodles (wheat flour), soybean soup
- Food energy (per 1 serving): 110 kcal (460 kJ)

Korean name
- Hangul: 콩국수
- RR: kongguksu
- MR: k'ongguksu
- IPA: [kʰoŋ.ɡuk̚.s͈u]

Kong-guksu (Korean: 콩국수; lit. 'soybean noodles') or noodles in cold soybean soup is a seasonal Korean noodle dish served in a cold soy milk broth. It comprises noodles made with wheat flour and soup made from ground soybeans. It is unknown when Korean people started eating kongguksu; however, in accordance with the mention of the dish along with kkaeguksu (깨국수; lit. 'sesame noodle soup') in Siui jeonseo, a Joseon-era cookbook published around the late 19th century, it is presumed to have originated at least as early as the 19th century. It is served with salt or sugar depending on the region.

== See also ==
- Korean cuisine
- Naengmyeon
- Kalguksu
