= Korean noodles =

Noodles in Korean cuisine

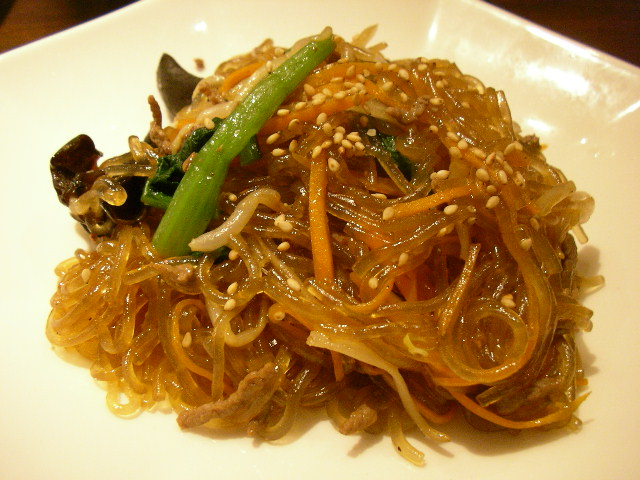
- Japchae, a Korean dish of stir-fried cellophane noodles
- Type: Noodle
- Place of origin: Korea

Korean name
- Hangul: 국수
- RR: guksu
- MR: kuksu

Alternate name
- Hangul: 면
- Hanja: 麵, 麪
- RR: myeon
- MR: myŏn

Korean noodles are noodles or noodle dishes in Korean cuisine, and are collectively referred to as guksu (국수) in Hangul or myeon (麪) in hanja.

In Korea, traditional noodle dishes are onmyeon (beef broth-based noodle soup), called guksu jangguk (noodles with a hot clear broth), naengmyeon (cold buckwheat noodles), bibim guksu (cold noodle dish mixed with vegetables), kalguksu (knife-cut noodles), kongguksu (noodles with a cold soybean broth) among others. In royal court, baekmyeon (literally "white noodles") consisting of buckwheat noodles and pheasant broth, was regarded as the top quality noodle dish. Naengmyeon, with a cold soup mixed with dongchimi (watery radish kimchi) and beef brisk broth, was eaten in court during summer.

== History ==
The earliest noodles in Asia originate from China, and date back 4,000 years ago.

== Noodles by ingredients ==
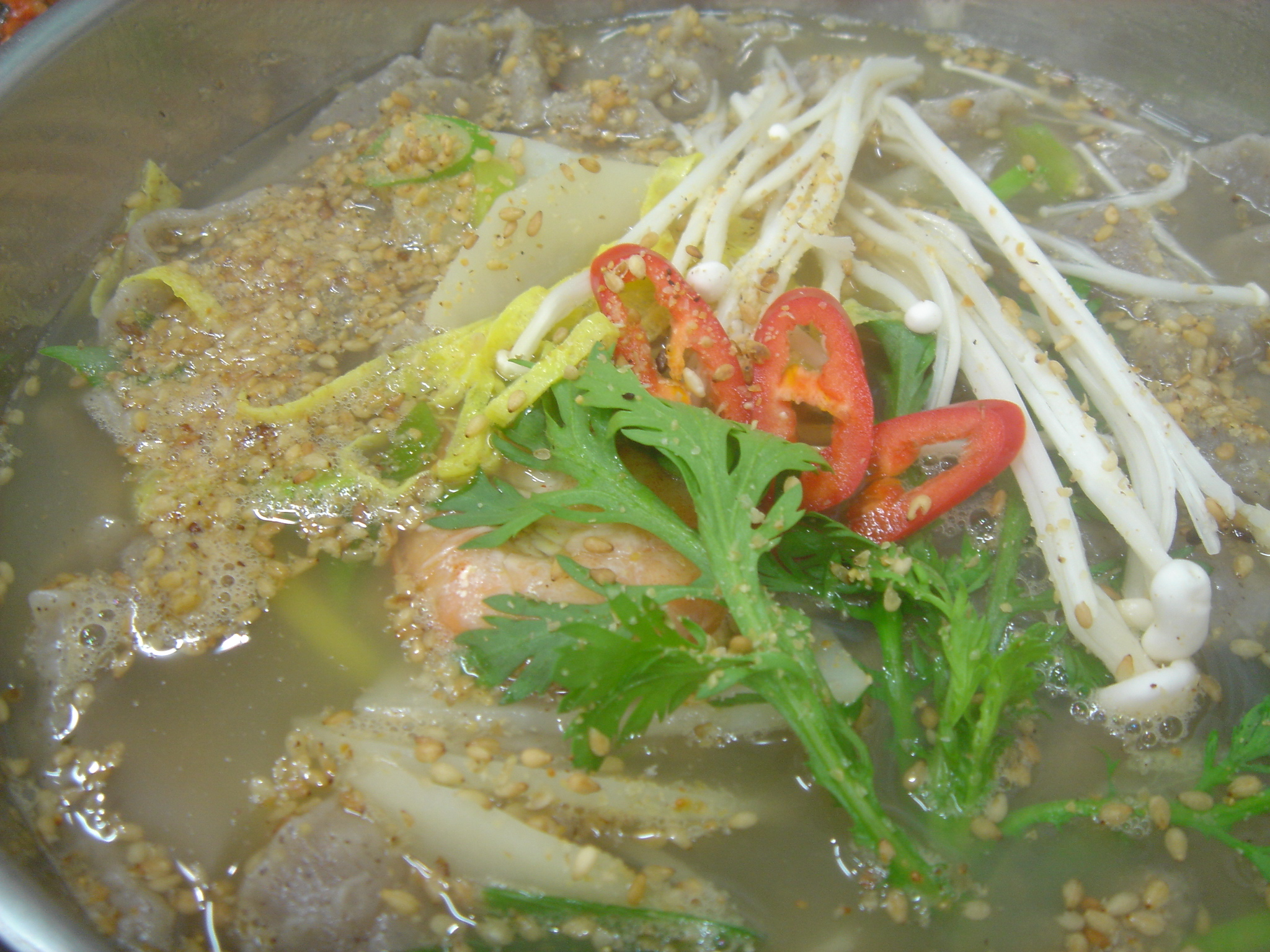
Memil guksu

- Dangmyeon (당면; cellophane noodles) – made from sweet potato starch
- Memil guksu (메밀국수) – buckwheat noodles similar to Japanese soba noodles
- Gogi-guksu (고기국수) – Noodle soup of Jeju Province made with sliced pork
- Olchaengi guksu (올챙이국수) – noodles made from dried corn flour which are eaten in mountainous places such as Gangwon Province
- Gamja guksu (감자국수) – noodles made from a mixture of potato starch, rice flour, and glutinous rice flour

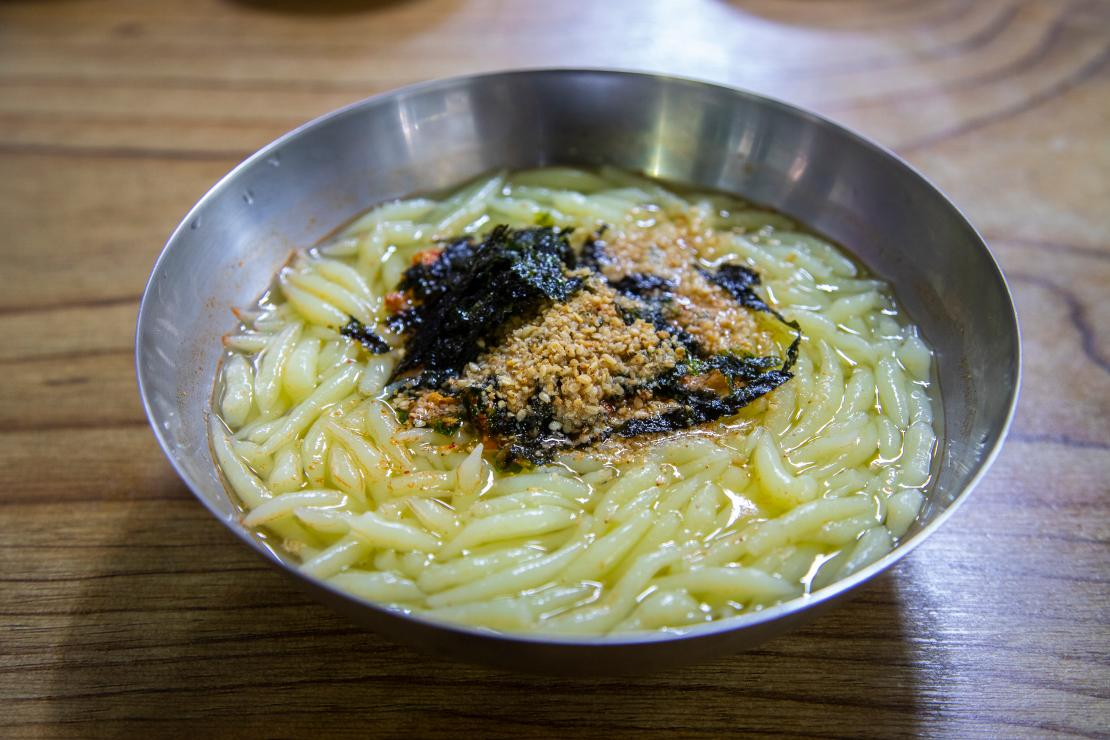
Olchaengi guksu

- Gamjanongma guksu (감자농마국수) – noodles made from potato starch that have a very chewy texture. It is a local specialty of Hwanghae Province
- Milguksu (밀국수) – wheat flour noodles. While noodles were eaten in Korea from ancient times, productions of wheat was less than that of other crops, so wheat noodles did not become a daily food until 1945.
- Dotori guksu (도토리 국수)– noodles made from acorn flour
- Chilk guksu (칡국수) – noodles made from kudzu and buckwheat
- Ssuk kalguksu (쑥칼국수) – noodles made from Artemisia princeps and wheat flour
- Hobak guksu (호박국수) – noodles made from pumpkin and wheat flour
- Kkolttu guksu (꼴뚜국수) – noodles made from buckwheat flour and wheat flour
- Cheonsachae (천사채) – half-transparent noodles made from the jelly-like extract left after steaming kelp, without the addition of grain flour or starch. The taste is bland, so they are generally eaten as a light salad after seasoned or served as a garnish beneath saengseon hoe (sliced raw fish). Cheonsachae has a chewy texture and is low in calories.

== Noodle dishes ==
=== Banchan ===
- Japchae – Sweet potato noodles (cellophane noodles) stir-fried with thinly sliced beef and vegetables; it may be served either hot or cold.

=== Warm noodle soups ===
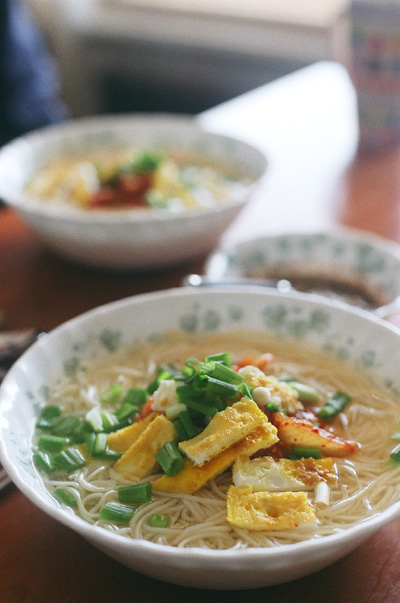
Janchiguksu

- Janchi guksu – wheat flour noodles in a light broth made with anchovy and optionally kelp or beef broth. It is served with a sauce made with sesame oil, soy sauce, scallions and a small amount of chili pepper powder. Thinly sliced jidan (지단), or fried egg, gim, and zucchini are topped on the dish for garnish. The name is derived from the word janchi (잔치, feast or banquet) in Korean because the dish was specialty foods for birthdays, weddings or auspicious occasions since the long, continuous shape was thought to be associated with the bliss for longevity and long-lasting marriage.
- Kalguksu – knife-cut wheat flour noodles served in a large bowl with seafood-based broth and other ingredients.
- Gomguksu (곰국수) – wheat flour noodles in a broth of gomguk or gomtang which is made from boiling beef bones or cartilage.
- Jjamppong (짬뽕) – wheat flour noodles in a spicy broth including vegetables and seafood.
- Jjapaguri (ram-don)
- Ramyeon – instant noodles similar to Ramen

=== Cool noodle dishes ===
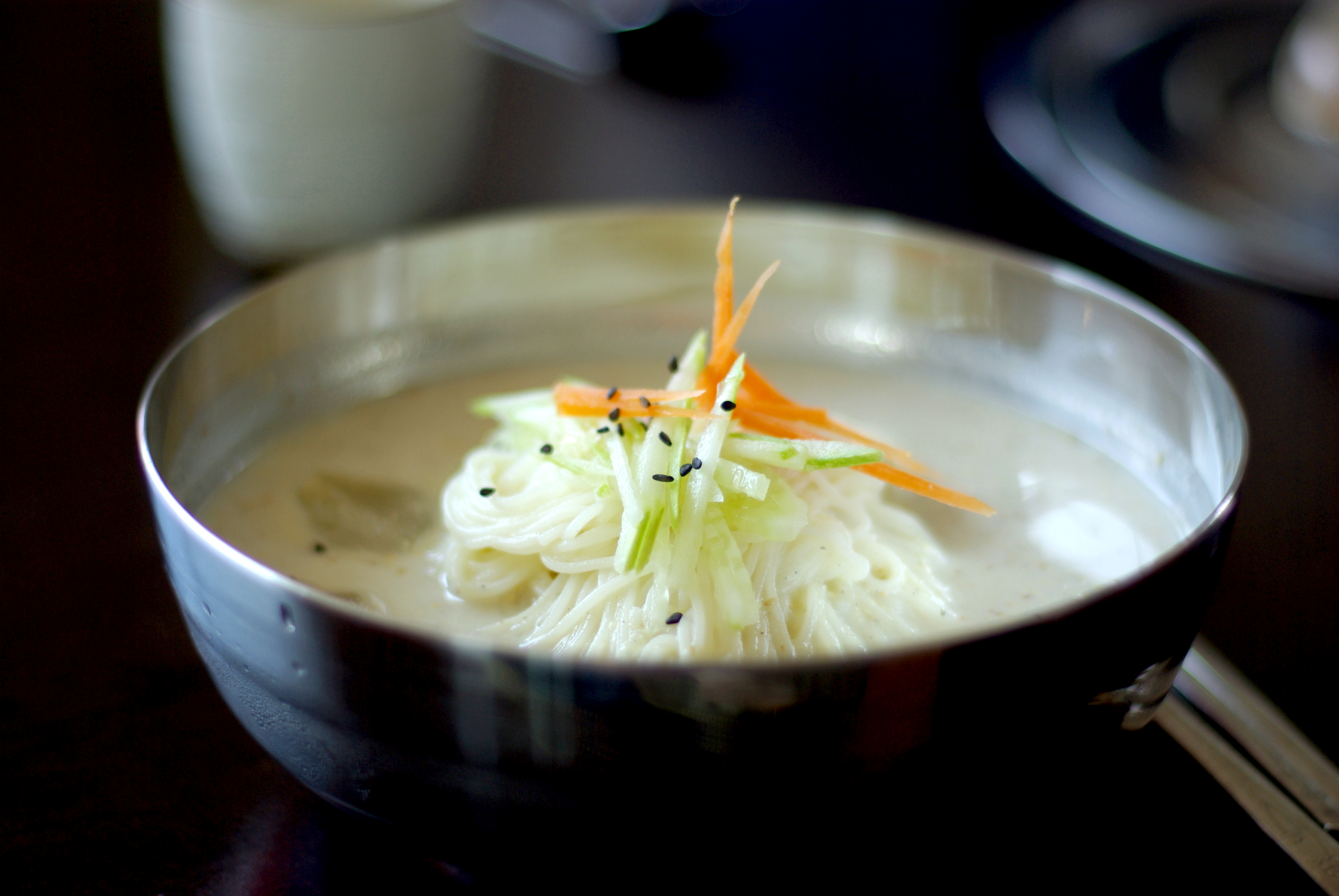
Kongguksu

- Bibim guksu – thin wheat flour noodles served with a spicy sauce made from gochujang and vinegar. Half a hard-boiled egg, thinly sliced cucumber, and sometimes chopped kimchi are added as garnishes.

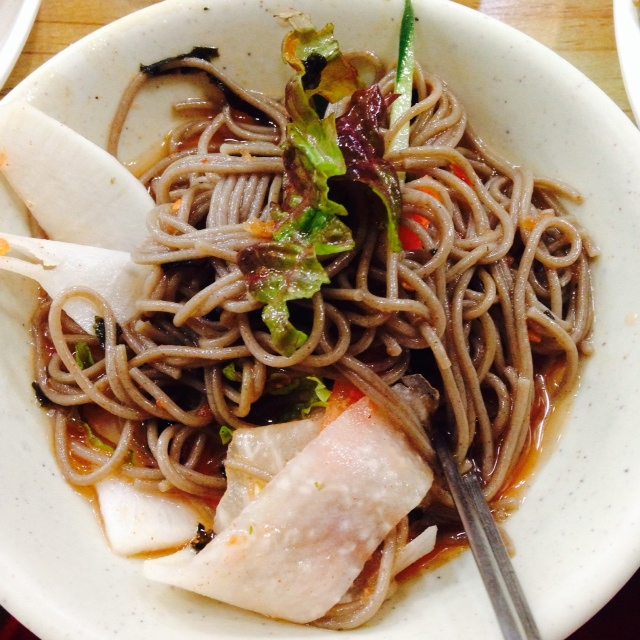
Chuncheon makguksu

- Makguksu – buckwheat noodle soup, especially popular in Gangwon Province and its capital city, Chuncheon
- Naengmyeon – thin buckwheat noodles either served in a cold soup or served with a gochujang-based sauce; the noodles and other vegetable ingredients are stirred together by the diner. It is originally a winter dish, and a local specialty of the Ibuk region (이북지방, nowadays the area of North Korea).
  - Mul naengmyeon – literally "water cold noodles". It is served in a bowl of a tangy cold to tepid soup, not typically served as cold as its South Korean counterparts, made with beef broth or dongchimi. Vinegar or mustard sauce can be added to taste.
  - Bibim naengmyeon – literally "mixed cold noodles". It is served with no broth, but mixed with the spicy, tangy sauce called chogochujang, made from gochujang, vinegar, and sugar.
- Jjolmyeon (쫄면) – similar to bibim naengmyeon, but the noodles are more chewy. It is a representative dish of Incheon
- Milmyeon (밀면) – A dish unique to Busan, derived from naengmyeon
- Kongguksu (콩국수) – wheat flour noodles in a bowl of cold soy milk broth
- Jatguksu (잣국수) – wheat flour or buckwheat noodles in a bowl of cold broth made from ground pine nuts and water. It is a local specialty of Gapyeong, Gyeonggi Province. The recipe is quite similar to kongguksu, but the dish has cleaner and more savory taste.
- Dongchimi guksu (동치미국수) – wheat or buckwheat noodles in a bowl of cold dongchimi.

== See also ==
- Chinese noodles
- Japanese noodles
- Korean cuisine
- Vietnamese cuisine
- List of noodles
- List of noodle dishes
- Noodle soup
