= Mak-guksu =

Korean buckwheat noodle dish

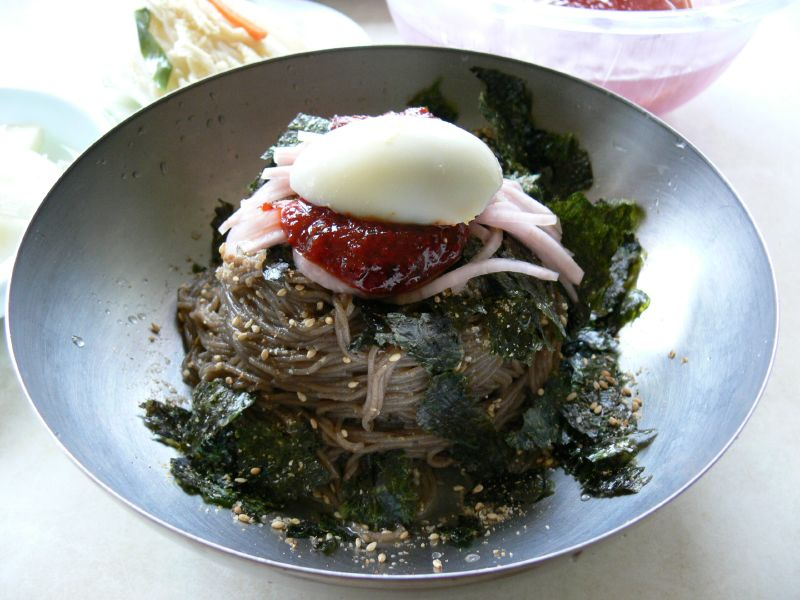
- Alternative names: Buckwheat noodles
- Type: Guksu
- Region or state: Gangwon Province, South Korea
- Serving temperature: chilled
- Main ingredients: Buckwheat noodles, broth, vegetables
- Similar dishes: Naengmyeon

Korean name
- Hangul: 막국수
- RR: makguksu
- MR: makkuksu
- IPA: [mak̚.k͈uk̚.s͈u]

Mak-guksu (Korean: 막국수) or buckwheat noodles is a Korean buckwheat noodle dish served in chilled broth or kimchi soup and sometimes with sugar, mustard, sesame oil or vinegar. It is a local specialty of Gangwon Province, especially Chuncheon. It means "noodles carelessly made and carelessly eaten" (막 만들어서 막 먹는 국수) or "noodles that are just made" (막 만든 국수).

== History ==
Buckwheat is thought to have been cultivated in Korea since the 5th century. Buckwheat noodles were eaten in Gangwon Province, Hamgyong Province, and Pyongan Province which have conditions suitable for buckwheat growth.

There are several stories on the origin of mak-guksu. Some say that it was made when the government recommended the cultivation of buckwheat to overcome famine after the Imjin War while others say that it originated from buckwheat sujebi eaten by slash-and-burn farmers.

The earliest record of the word "makguksu" in print media is a newspaper article in 1934. Mak-guksu was originally eaten in the winter as a late-night snack in Chuncheon and Pyongyang but began to be eaten in all seasons in the 1970s. The completion of the Soyang Dam in 1973 and the subsequent development of Chuncheon as a tourist destination played a major role in transforming mak-guksu from a regional specialty into a nationally recognized dish, as construction workers and visitors from across the country widely tasted and popularized it.

== Types ==
- Jaengban-guksu (쟁반국수; lit. 'tray noodles') is a large amount of mak-guksu (enough for 2 to 3 people) served on a tray with generous toppings.
- In Gangwon, mul-makguksu (물막국수; water makguksu) and bibim-makguksu (비빔막국수; mixed makguksu) are not distinguished and makguksu and broth are served separately when ordered. If you pour little broth, it becomes bibim-makguksu and if you pour a lot, it becomes mul-makguksu.

== Ingredients and preparation ==
1. Make noodles from kneading buckwheat powder. Buckwheat noodles easily break when heated, so buckwheat powder and flour are mixed in a ratio of about 7:3.
2. Cut kimchi roughly. Any kimchi such as dongchimi, nabak-kimchi, and baechu-kimchi can be used.
3. Cut cucumbers, salt them, and squeeze them.
4. Put the noodles in a bowl and pour the kimchi soup (국물).
5. Put the sliced kimchi and pickled cucumbers on top and sprinkle sesame salt and chilli powder.

It is often eaten with boiled pork and gamjajeon.

== Festivals ==
Chuncheon Dak-galbi & Makguksu Festival is held every August since 1996 by Chuncheon City and KBS Chuncheon. Events such as makguksu eating competition and song competition take place.

== Gallery ==
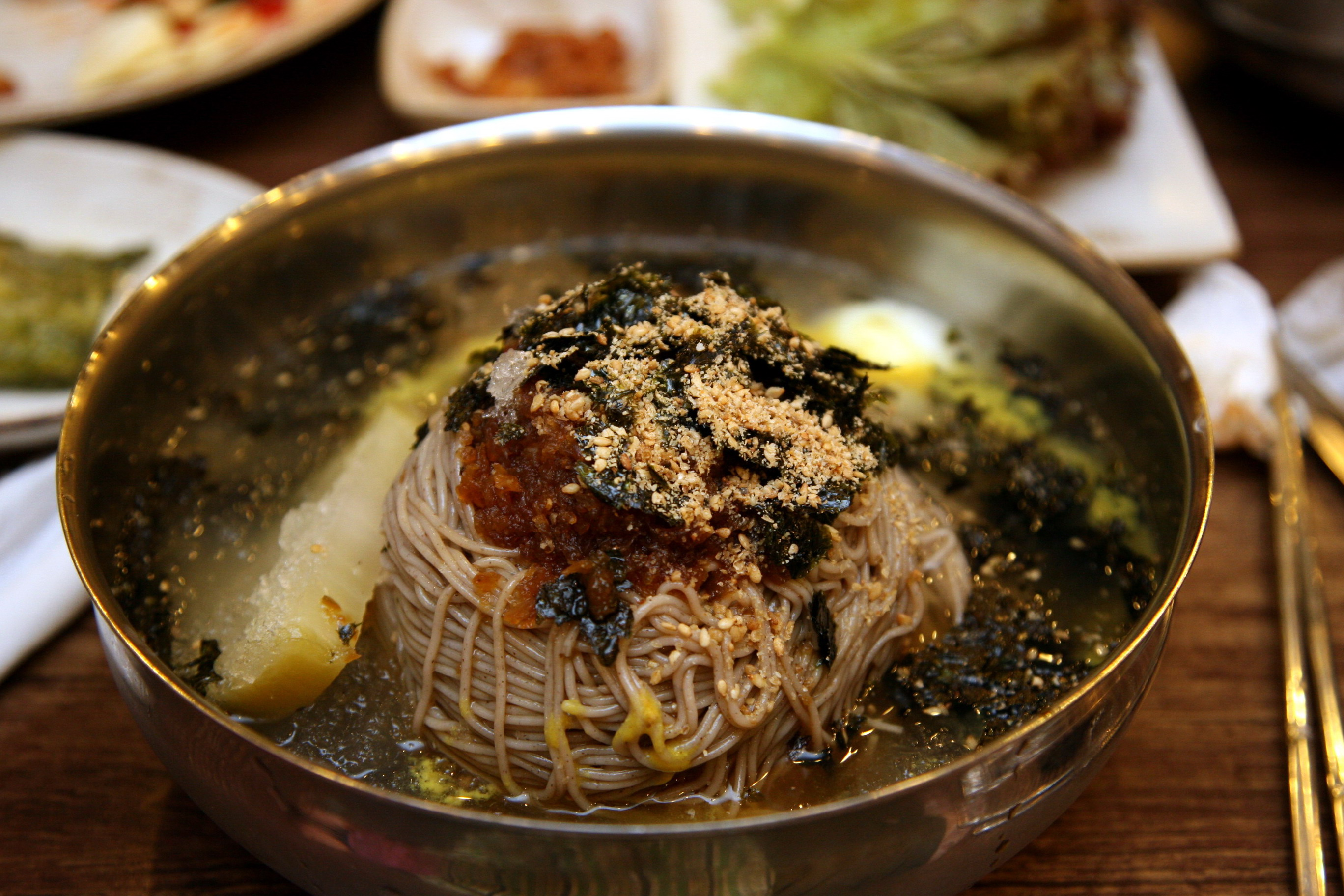
Mul-makguksu

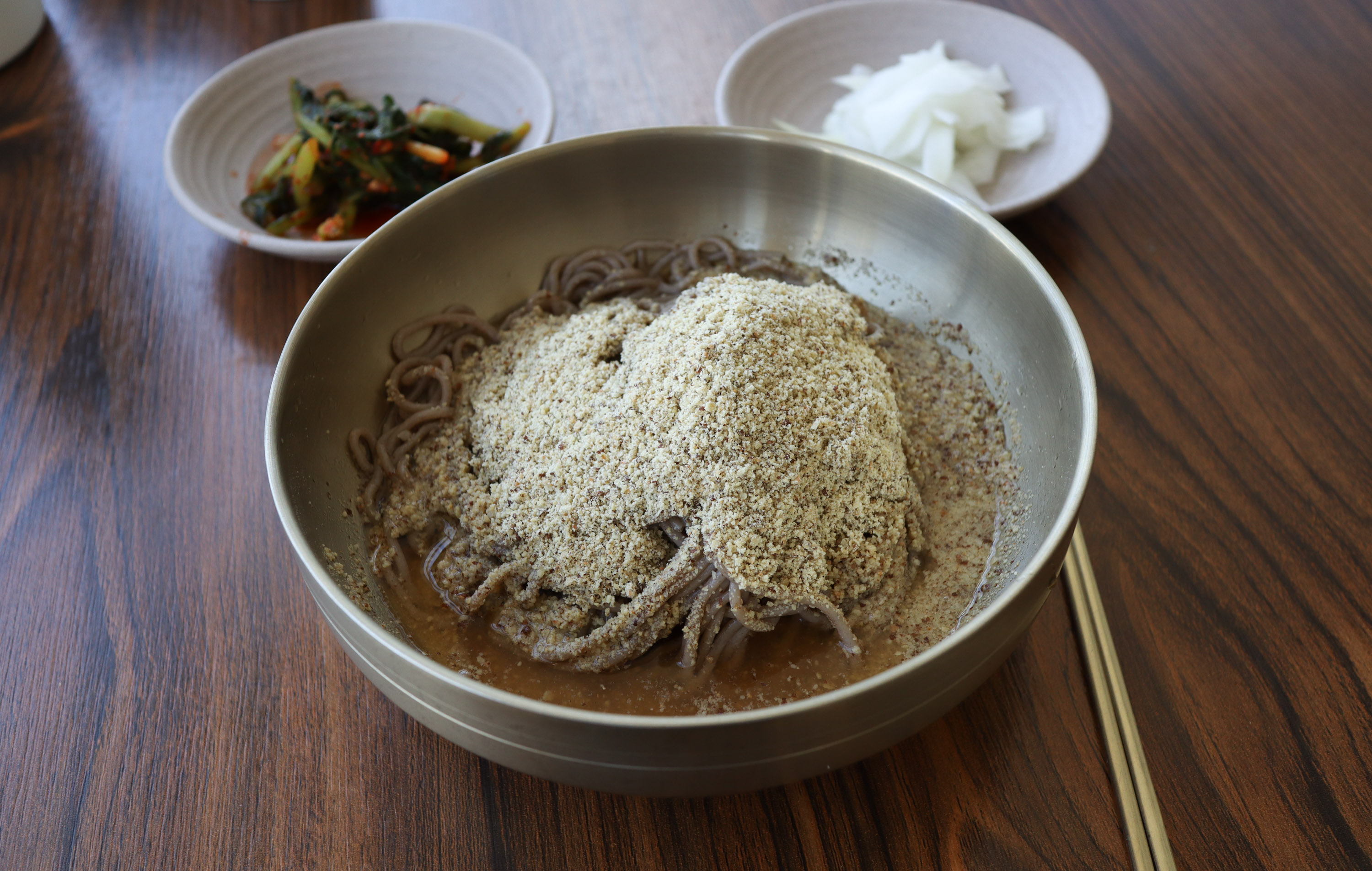
Makguksu with perilla seeds

== See also ==
- Korean cuisine
- List of buckwheat dishes
