= Naengmyeon =

Korean cold noodle dish

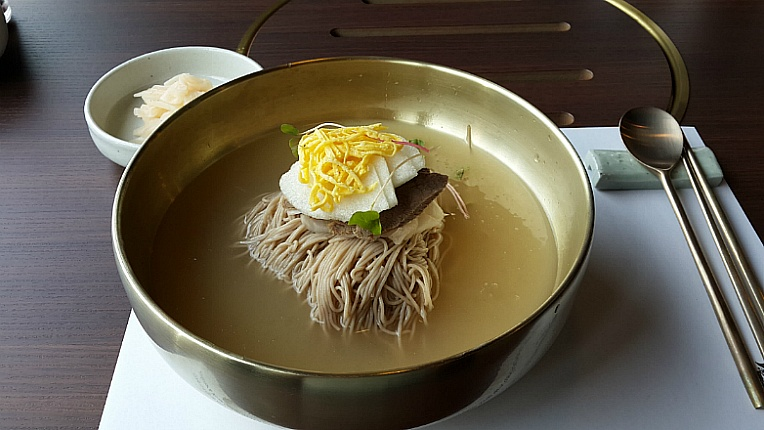
- A bowl of naengmyeon
- Alternative names: Raengmyŏn, cold noodles
- Type: Guksu
- Course: Main course
- Place of origin: Korea
- Region or state: Pyongyang and Hamhung
- Associated cuisine: Korean cuisine
- Serving temperature: Cold
- Main ingredients: Noodles (flour and starch of buckwheat, potatoes, sweet potatoes)
- Variations: Mul-naengmyeon, bibim-naengmyeon, hoe-naengmyeon
- Food energy (per 100 serving): 110 kcal (460 kJ)
Nutritional value
(per 100 serving)
- Protein: 27 g
- Fat: 1 g
- Carbohydrate: 55-62 g
- Glycemic index: 62 (medium)

South Korean name
- Hangul: 냉면
- Hanja: 冷麵
- RR: naengmyeon
- MR: naengmyŏn
- IPA: [nɛŋ.mjʌn]

North Korean name
- Hangul: 랭면
- Hanja: 冷麵
- RR: raengmyeon
- MR: raengmyŏn
- IPA: [ɾɛŋ.mjʌn]

Naengmyeaon (냉면, in South Korea) or Raengmyŏn (랭면, in North Korea) is a noodle dish of North Korean origin which consists of long and thin handmade noodles made from the flour and starch of various ingredients, including most commonly buckwheat (메밀, memil) but also potatoes, sweet potatoes, arrowroot starch (darker color and chewier than buckwheat noodles), and kudzu (칡, chik). Other varieties of naengmyeon are made from ingredients such as seaweed and green tea.

In modern times, the mul naengmyeon (물 냉면) variant is commonly associated with and popularly consumed during the summer; however, it was historically a dish enjoyed during winter.

== History ==
According to the 19th-century historical text Dongguksesigi (동국세시기; 東國歲時記), naengmyeon has been made since the Joseon period. Originally a delicacy in northern Korea, especially in the cities of Pyongyang (평양) and Hamhung (함흥), naengmyeon became widely popular throughout Korea in both North and South Korea after the Korean War.

Naengmyeon is served in a large brass or stainless-steel bowl with a tangy iced broth, julienned cucumbers, slices of Korean pear, thin, wide strips of lightly pickled radish, and either a boiled egg or slices of cold boiled beef or both. Spicy mustard sauce (or mustard oil) and vinegar are often added before consumption. Traditionally, the long noodles would be eaten without cutting, as they symbolized longevity of life and good health, but servers at restaurants usually ask if the noodles should be cut prior to eating, and use or provide scissors to cut the noodles.

Since the late 2010s, Pyongyang naengmyeon has gained significant popularity among younger generations in South Korea. Driven by social media, a culinary trend emerged where consumers actively visit and compare different established naengmyeon restaurants. Public interest in the dish spiked significantly following the April 2018 Inter-Korean Summit, during which Okryu-gwan cold noodles were served as a main dish.

== Varieties ==
The two main varieties of naengmyeon are mul naengmyeon (물 냉면) and bibim naengmyeon (비빔 냉면). The former is served as a cold noodle soup made from beef, chicken or dongchimi broth. The latter is served with a spicy dressing made primarily from gochujang (red chili paste) and eaten mixed. In the case of bibim naengmyeon, a bowl of broth used in mul naengmyeon or plain broth from the boiled noodles itself are often served on the side. This broth can be served hot or cold depending on the restaurant and type of broth. Boiled eggs and sliced cucumbers are often added as a garnish.

Mul naengmyeon originates from Pyongyang. Pyongyang naengmyeon is mainly made from buckwheat and either beef or pheasant broth. It also uses dongchimi broth or a mixture of it, while adding sliced pieces of radish to the dish. Vinegar, mustard oil (provided on request at most restaurants), and sugar is added according to taste before eating. South Koreans do not add sugar and use beef broth exclusively. In South Jeolla Province, mul naengmyeon is often served with red chili paste that is mixed in with the broth. The effect is similar to adding the broth to a bowl of bibim naengmyeon.

A version of bibim naengmyeon originates from Hamhung, the hoe naengmyeon (회 냉면). Hoe naengmyeon is bibim naengmyeon with additional marinated raw fish (hoe), usually skate. It is eaten with gochujang and other ingredients mixed. Vinegar, sugar, and sometimes sesame oil are added according to taste. The noodles of Hamhung naengmyeon are typically made from potato or sweet potato starch, making the noodles chewier in texture compared to those of Pyongyang naengmyeon. In addition to skate, pollock (명태) can also be used in hoe naengmyeon. In this case it is referred to as myeongtae hoe naengmyeon (명태회냉면).

Another variety of naengmyeon is yeolmu naengmyeon (열무 냉면) which is served with yeolmu kimchi, made from the leaves of the yeolmu summer radish.

Jinju-naengmyeon (진주냉면) originates from Jinju on the southern coast of Korea, and unlike other varieties, the broth is made with various types of seafood mixed with meat, often garnished with ingredients such as abalone, sea cucumbers, shiitake mushrooms and kimchi. Its reputation for extravagance is acknowledged even in North Korea, when it was mentioned alongside Pyŏngyang naengmyŏn in a 1994 publication titled 'Folk Traditions of Chosŏn' (조선의 민속전통).

Jungguk-naengmyeon (중국냉면) is a Chinese-influenced cold noodle soup in Korean Chinese cuisine served with mustard and peanut butter on the side.

A Chinese version of the dish known as "Korean cold noodles" (朝鲜冷面; Cháoxiǎn lěng miàn) or "Dongbei cold noodles" (东北冷面; Dōngběi lěng miàn) is popular in the Northeast China region bordering Korea. Significant variation in preparation exists inside Northeast China, from the famous sour-and-sweet Yanji naengmyeon (延吉冷面; 연길랭면) to the sour-and-salty Jixi cold noodles.

Morioka reimen (盛岡冷麺) is derived from naengmyeon which was introduced by Korean immigrants, and is part of Japanese regional cuisine in Tohoku region.

Instant naengmyeon noodles are available, with the soup broth prepackaged with the noodles. A plastic package of mustard oil is often supplied.

== Gallery ==
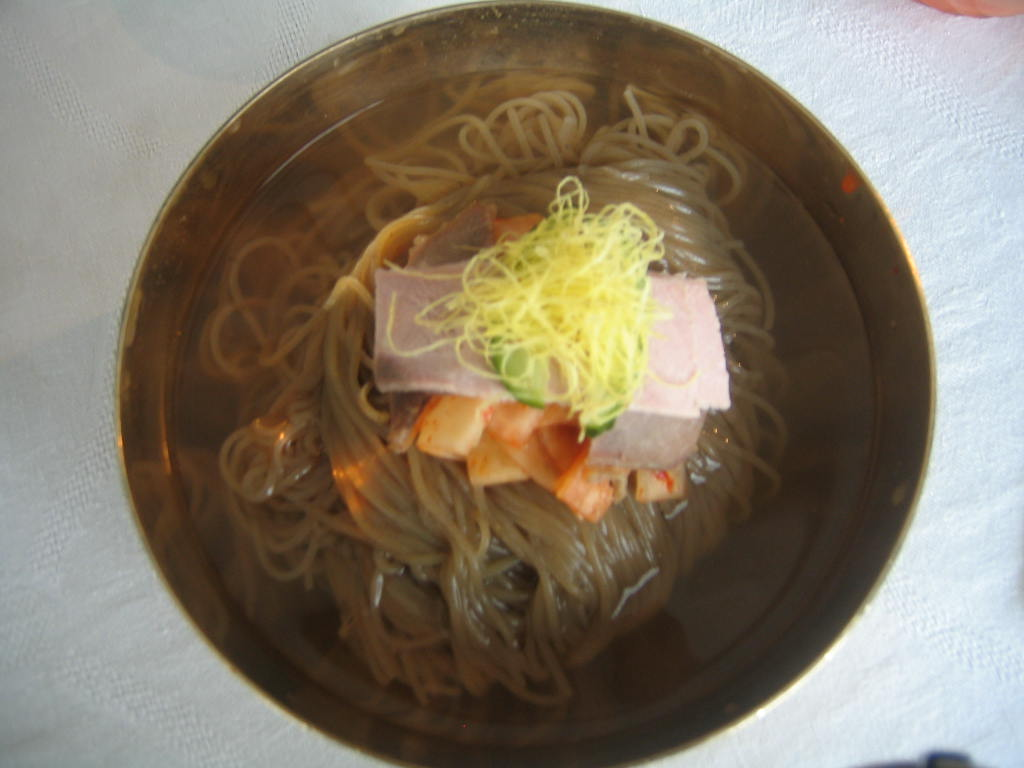
P'yŏngyang-raengmyŏn
(평양랭면 or 평양냉면)

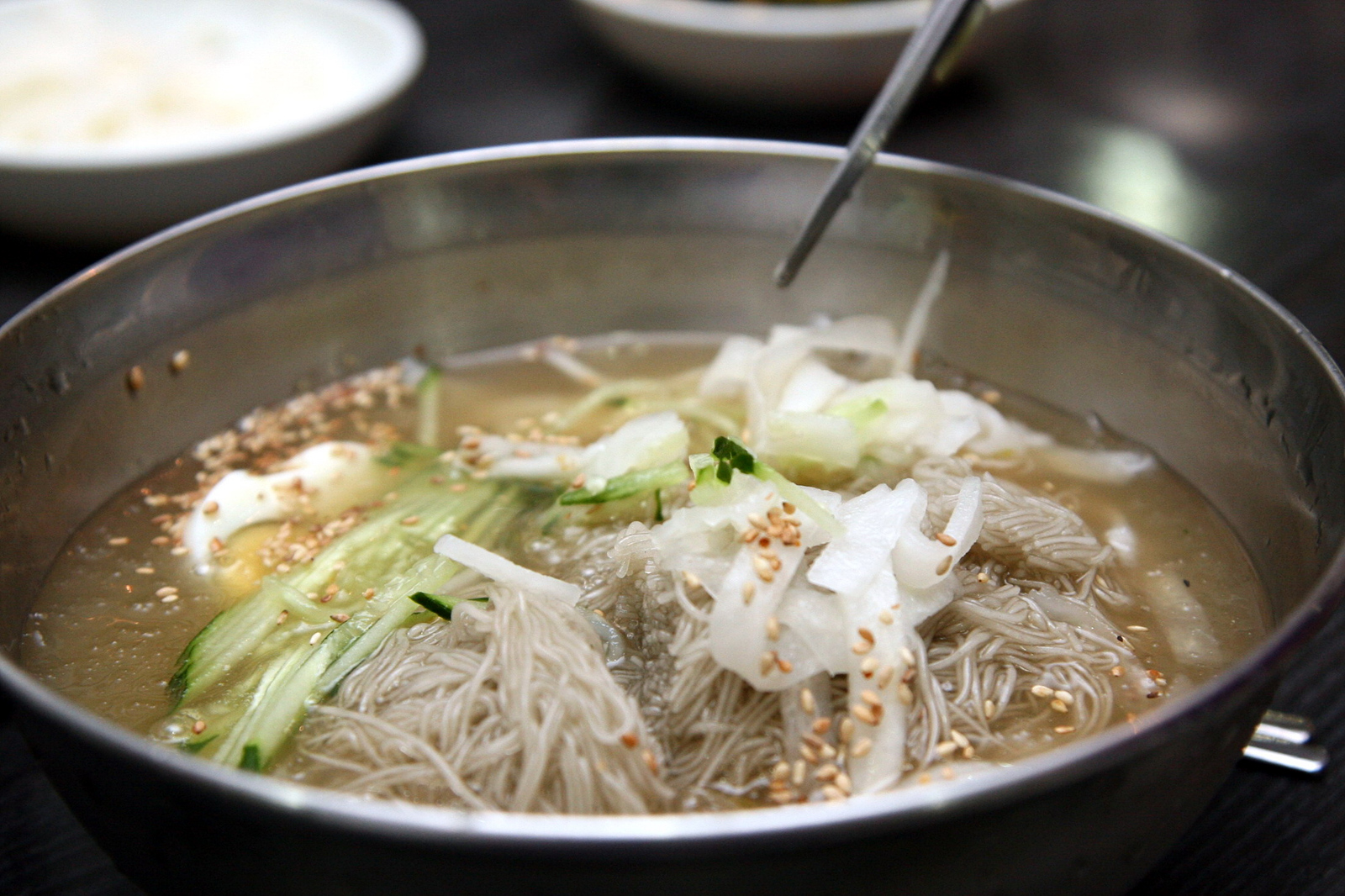
Mul-naengmyeon
(물냉면)

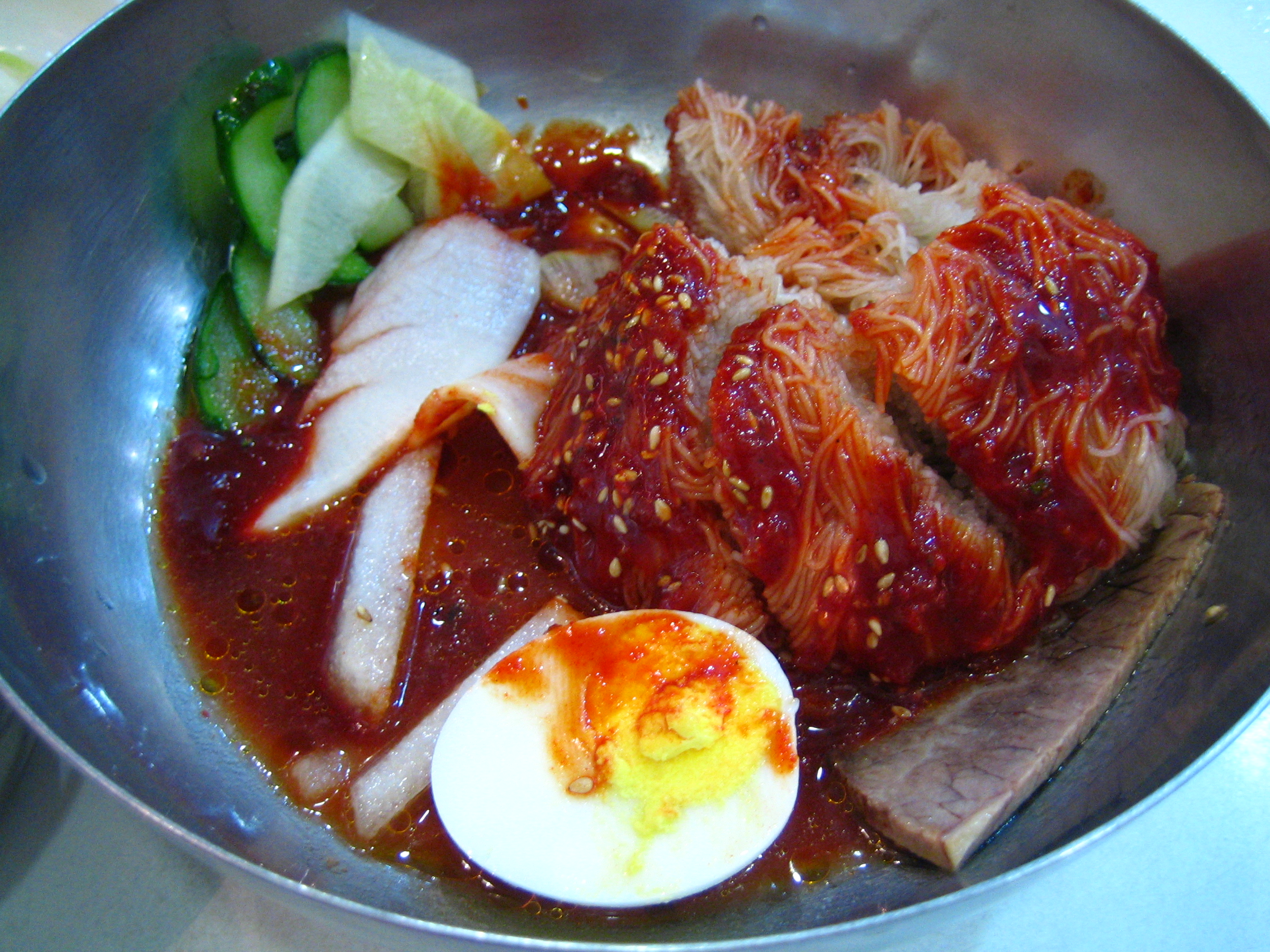
Bibim-naengmyeon
(비빔냉면)

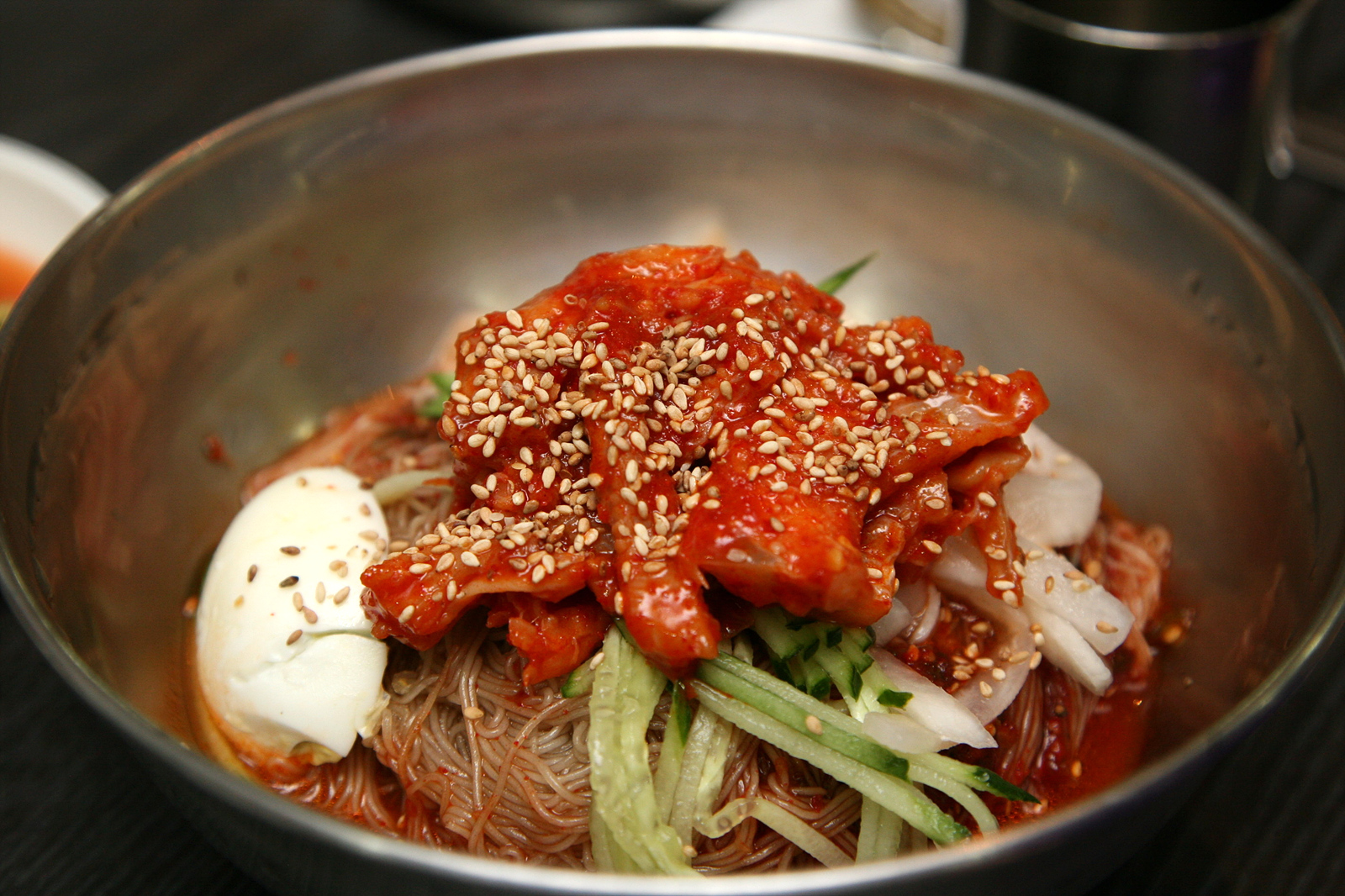
Hoe-naengmyeon
(회냉면)

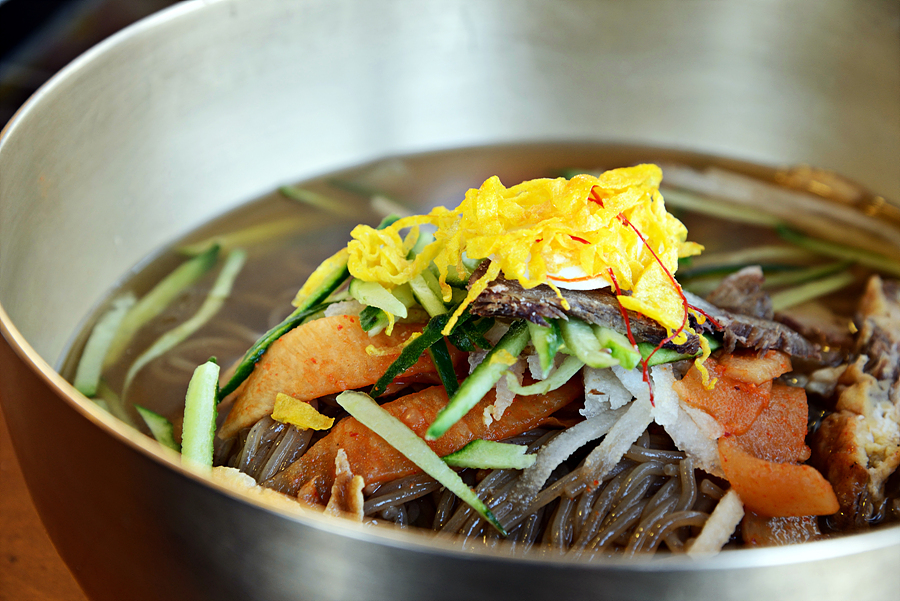
Jinju-naengmyeon
(진주냉면)

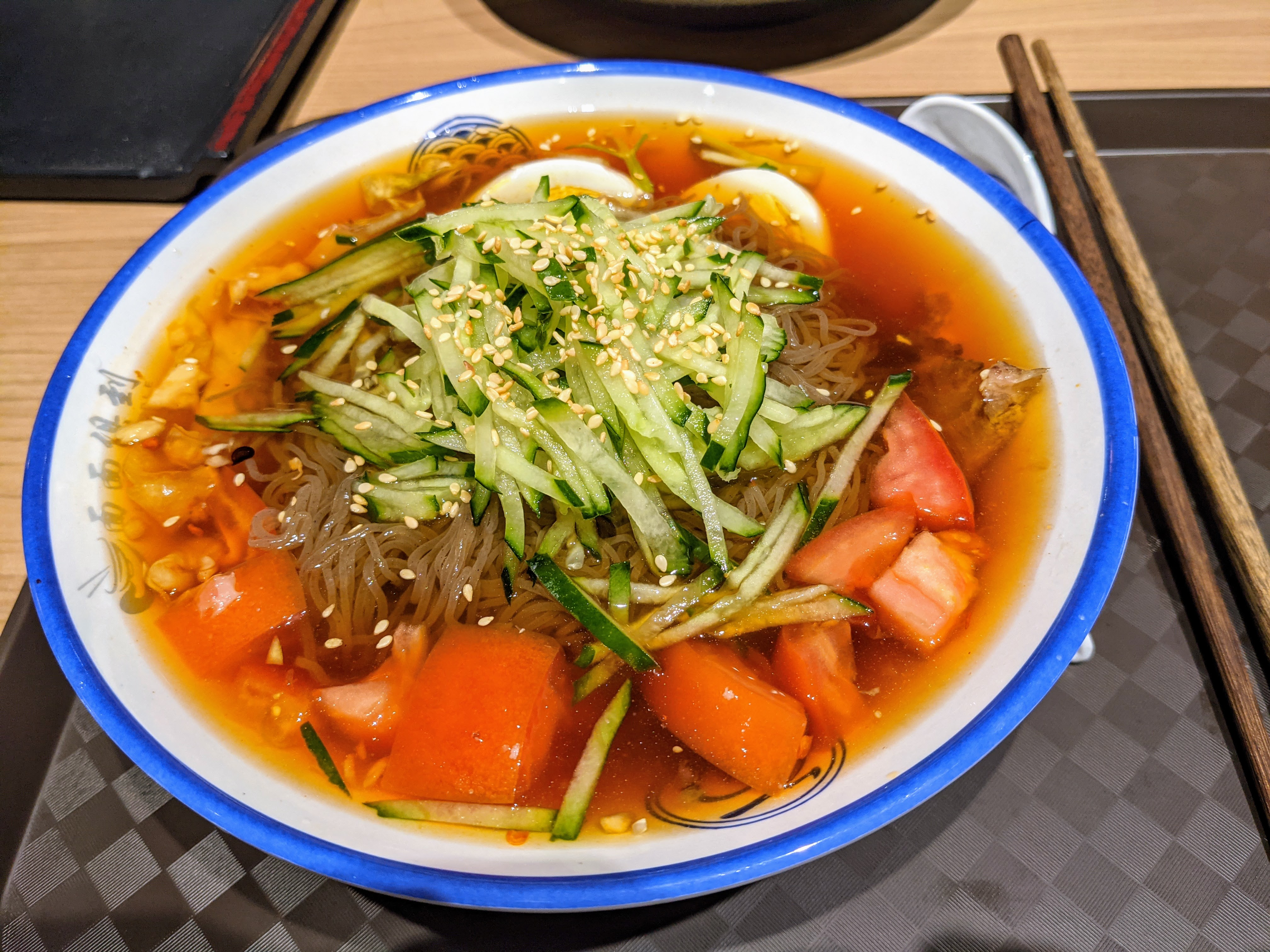
Dongbei lengmian
(Chinese: 东北冷面)

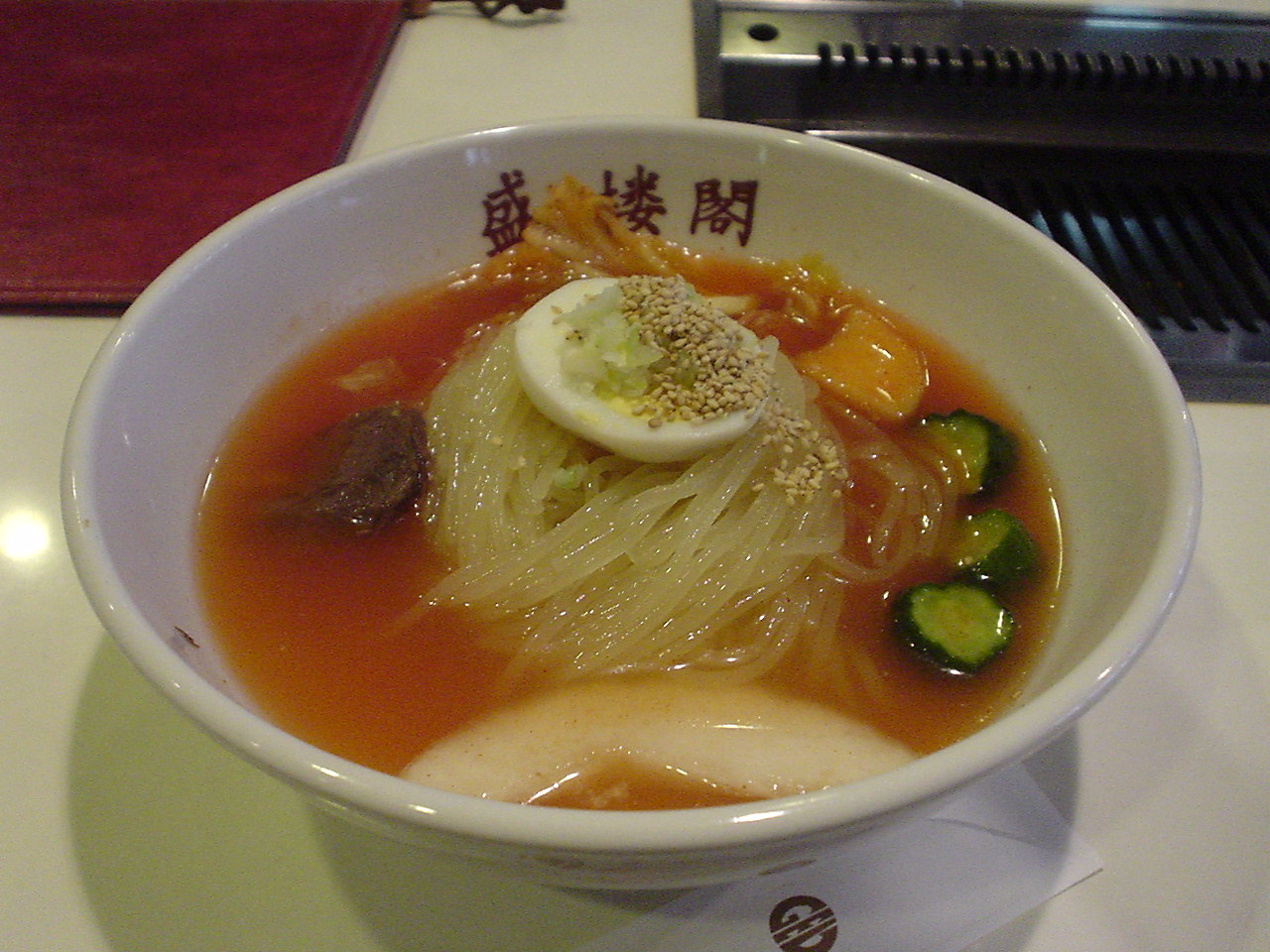
Morioka reimen
(Japanese: 盛岡冷麵)

== In popular culture ==
In the South Korean variety show Infinite Challenge, Park Myeong-su and Jessica Jung, a former member of Girls' Generation, performed the song "Naengmyeon" which was named after the food. The song became a hit and received wide acclaim.

== In politics ==
During the first summit between North and South Korean leaders Kim Jong Un and Moon Jae-in, Kim presented Moon with Pyongyang-style raengmyŏn as a gift.

== See also ==
- Korean cuisine
- Mak-guksu
- Milmyeon
- Kong-guksu
- Jat-guksu
