= Paik Jong-won's Alley Restaurant =

South Korean cooking-variety program

- Promotional poster from May 2021
- Hangul: 백종원의 골목식당
- Hanja: 白種元의골목食堂
- RR: Baek Jongwonui golmoksikdang
- MR: Paek Chongwŏnŭi kolmoksiktang
- Genre: Variety; Cooking
- Directed by: Kim Joon-soo; Lee Gwan-won; Jung Woo-jin
- Presented by: Paik Jong-won; Kim Sung-joo
- Country of origin: South Korea
- Original language: Korean
- No. of episodes: 200

Production
- Production location: South Korea
- Running time: 80 minutes

Original release
- Network: SBS
- Release: January 5, 2018 – December 29, 2021

Related
- Paik Jong-won's Top 3 Chef King

Paik Jong-won's Alley Restaurant (Korean: 백종원의 골목식당) is a South Korean cooking-variety program broadcast on January 5, 2018. It is a spin-off of cooking-variety program Paik Jong-won's Top 3 Chef King. It was hosted by Paik Jong-won and Kim Sung-joo and it aired on SBS every Friday at 23:20 (KST). Starting from August 29, 2018, the program changed the broadcast time slot to every Wednesday at 23:10 (KST), and competed for viewership ratings against MBC's Radio Star (Kim Gu-ra), JTBC's Let's Eat Dinner Together (Lee Kyung-kyu and Kang Ho-dong) and tvN's You Quiz on the Block (Yoo Jae-suk).

On October 25, 2021, it was announced that the program will conclude with 200 episodes by end of 2021 with last filming was held on November 26.

== Cast ==
=== Main host ===
- Paik Jong-won (Episodes 1–200)
- Kim Sung-joo (Episodes 1–200)

=== Special co-host ===
- Kim Se-jeong (Gugudan) (Episodes 1–10)
- Jo Bo-ah (Episodes 11–59)
- Jung In-sun (Episodes 60–168)
- Keum Sae-rok (Episodes 169–200)

=== Guest ===
- Go Jae-geun (Episodes 1–5)
- Nam Chang-hee (Episodes 1–5)
- Don Spike (Episodes 6–10)
- Cao Lu (Fiestar) (Episodes 6–10)
- Sayuri Fujita (Episodes 11–15)
- Andy (Shinhwa) (Episodes 11–15)
- Heo Kyung-hwan (Episodes 11–15)
- Lee Myung-hoon (Episodes 13–15)
- Hwang Chi-yeul (Episodes 16–20)
- Nam Bo-ra (Episodes 16–20)
- Tei (Episodes 21–25)
- Bae Yoon-kyung (Episodes 21–25)
- Kim Min-kyo (Episodes 26–29)
- Jung In-sun (Episodes 26–29)

== List of episodes ==
=== Series overview ===
Year	Episodes	Originally aired	
Year	Episodes	First aired	Last aired
2018	46	January 5, 2018	December 26, 2018
2019	52	January 2, 2019	December 25, 2019
2020	52	January 1, 2020	December 30, 2020
2021	50	January 6, 2021	December 29, 2021

=== 2018 ===
List of episodes in 2018 (episode 1–46)

#	Episode #	Broadcast Date	Alley(s) Position	Restaurant owner/chef and main dish(es)	Remark
117	1	January 5, 2018	Ehwayeodae-gil (first segment of alley 3, 5, 7 from main road), in front of Ewha Womans University, Seodaemun District, Seoul	Min Myung-nim (65) & Han Dong-heon (36): Homemade Burger; Lee Sang-cheol (60) & Hong Choon-gi (63): Stir-fried Spicy Pork, (Spicy/Curry) Soft Tofu Stew; Noh Yong-taek (43): Cold Soba dishes; Lee Chang-jae (35): Hot Ramen dishes; Celebrity guests Go Jae-geun (39) & Nam Chang-hee (35): Salmon/Tuna Rice/Salad Poke	Debut of the new format "Paik Jong-won's Alley Restaurant", a project to revive the alleys which have been bustling in the past. Mr. Paik come in a target alley and help few restaurant owners to improve the quality of main dishes in their menu for customers' attracting.
118	2	January 12, 2018	Ehwayeodae-gil (first segment of alley 3, 5, 7 from main road), in front of Ewha Womans University, Seodaemun District, Seoul	Min Myung-nim (65) & Han Dong-heon (36): Homemade Burger; Lee Sang-cheol (60) & Hong Choon-gi (63): Stir-fried Spicy Pork, (Spicy/Curry) Soft Tofu Stew; Noh Yong-taek (43): Cold Soba dishes; Lee Chang-jae (35): Hot Ramen dishes; Celebrity guests Go Jae-geun (39) & Nam Chang-hee (35): Salmon/Tuna Rice/Salad Poke	
119	3	January 19, 2018	Ehwayeodae-gil (first segment of alley 3, 5, 7 from main road), in front of Ewha Womans University, Seodaemun District, Seoul	Min Myung-nim (65) & Han Dong-heon (36): Homemade Burger; Lee Sang-cheol (60) & Hong Choon-gi (63): Stir-fried Spicy Pork, (Spicy/Curry) Soft Tofu Stew; Noh Yong-taek (43): Cold Soba dishes; Lee Chang-jae (35): Hot Ramen dishes; Celebrity guests Go Jae-geun (39) & Nam Chang-hee (35): Salmon/Tuna Rice/Salad Poke	
120	4	January 26, 2018	Ehwayeodae-gil (first segment of alley 3, 5, 7 from main road), in front of Ewha Womans University, Seodaemun District, Seoul	Min Myung-nim (65) & Han Dong-heon (36): Homemade Burger; Lee Sang-cheol (60) & Hong Choon-gi (63): Stir-fried Spicy Pork, (Spicy/Curry) Soft Tofu Stew; Noh Yong-taek (43): Cold Soba dishes; Lee Chang-jae (35): Hot Ramen dishes; Celebrity guests Go Jae-geun (39) & Nam Chang-hee (35): Salmon/Tuna Rice/Salad Poke	Special appearances as customer by Nam Hee-suk, Yoon Jung-soo, Kim Shin-young, Jo Se-ho and Kangnam.
121	5	February 2, 2018	Ehwayeodae-gil (first segment of alley 3, 5, 7 from main road), in front of Ewha Womans University, Seodaemun District, Seoul	Min Myung-nim (65) & Han Dong-heon (36): Homemade Burger; Lee Sang-cheol (60) & Hong Choon-gi (63): Stir-fried Spicy Pork, (Spicy/Curry) Soft Tofu Stew; Noh Yong-taek (43): Cold Soba dishes; Lee Chang-jae (35): Hot Ramen dishes; Celebrity guests Go Jae-geun (39) & Nam Chang-hee (35): Salmon/Tuna Rice/Salad Poke	Special appearances as customer by Lady Jane and Kangnam; as part-time staff by JooE (Momoland).
122	6	February 16, 2018	Pildong-ro (alley from main road, at the junction with the head of Seoae-ro), Pil-dong, Jung District, Seoul	Jung Jae-ok (51) & Lee Eun-soo (44): Anchovy noodles; Kim Il-joong (32) & Lee Jong-hoon (32) & Joo Kyung-won (28): Hamburg steak (served with classic sauce and rice, or tooroomba pasta, or carbonara pasta); Lee Da-som (28): Jeukseok-tteok-bokki; Celebrity guests Don Spike (41) & Cao Lu (30): Austrian Schnitzel, Hungarian Goulash (both use pork), butter rice	
123	7	February 23, 2018	Pildong-ro (alley from main road, at the junction with the head of Seoae-ro), Pil-dong, Jung District, Seoul	Jung Jae-ok (51) & Lee Eun-soo (44): Anchovy noodles; Kim Il-joong (32) & Lee Jong-hoon (32) & Joo Kyung-won (28): Hamburg steak (served with classic sauce and rice, or tooroomba pasta, or carbonara pasta); Lee Da-som (28): Jeukseok-tteok-bokki; Celebrity guests Don Spike (41) & Cao Lu (30): Austrian Schnitzel, Hungarian Goulash (both use pork), butter rice	
124	8	March 2, 2018	Pildong-ro (alley from main road, at the junction with the head of Seoae-ro), Pil-dong, Jung District, Seoul	Jung Jae-ok (51) & Lee Eun-soo (44): Anchovy noodles; Kim Il-joong (32) & Lee Jong-hoon (32) & Joo Kyung-won (28): Hamburg steak (served with classic sauce and rice, or tooroomba pasta, or carbonara pasta); Lee Da-som (28): Jeukseok-tteok-bokki; Celebrity guests Don Spike (41) & Cao Lu (30): Austrian Schnitzel, Hungarian Goulash (both use pork), butter rice	
125	9	March 9, 2018	Pildong-ro (alley from main road, at the junction with the head of Seoae-ro), Pil-dong, Jung District, Seoul	Jung Jae-ok (51) & Lee Eun-soo (44): Anchovy noodles; Kim Il-joong (32) & Lee Jong-hoon (32) & Joo Kyung-won (28): Hamburg steak (served with classic sauce and rice, or tooroomba pasta, or carbonara pasta); Lee Da-som (28): Jeukseok-tteok-bokki; Celebrity guests Don Spike (41) & Cao Lu (30): Austrian Schnitzel, Hungarian Goulash (both use pork), butter rice	
126	10	March 16, 2018	Pildong-ro (alley from main road, at the junction with the head of Seoae-ro), Pil-dong, Jung District, Seoul	Jung Jae-ok (51) & Lee Eun-soo (44): Anchovy noodles; Kim Il-joong (32) & Lee Jong-hoon (32) & Joo Kyung-won (28): Hamburg steak (served with classic sauce and rice, or tooroomba pasta, or carbonara pasta); Lee Da-som (28): Jeukseok-tteok-bokki; Celebrity guests Don Spike (41) & Cao Lu (30): Austrian Schnitzel, Hungarian Goulash (both use pork), butter rice	Special appearance as customer by Hana (Gugudan).; Co-host Kim Se-jeong last episode.
127	11	March 23, 2018	Sodam-gil, Gongdeok-dong, Mapo District, Seoul	Lee Jeong-soon (72): Pollack soup; Kim Kyung-im (62) & Kwak Bok-soon (61): Kimchi-jjigae, Dak-bokkeum-tang; Shin Hee-soon (59): Spicy Grilled Baby Octopus, Seafood Soft Tofu Stew; Yoon Cheol-won (44): Lao Rice noodles; Celebrity guests Sayuri (38) & Andy (37) & Heo Kyung-hwan (37) & Lee Myung-hoon (29): Seafood Curry Soup, Curry Udon, Baked Curry Rice	Jo Bo-ah joined as co-host.
128	12	March 30, 2018	Sodam-gil, Gongdeok-dong, Mapo District, Seoul	Lee Jeong-soon (72): Pollack soup; Kim Kyung-im (62) & Kwak Bok-soon (61): Kimchi-jjigae, Dak-bokkeum-tang; Shin Hee-soon (59): Spicy Grilled Baby Octopus, Seafood Soft Tofu Stew; Yoon Cheol-won (44): Lao Rice noodles; Celebrity guests Sayuri (38) & Andy (37) & Heo Kyung-hwan (37) & Lee Myung-hoon (29): Seafood Curry Soup, Curry Udon, Baked Curry Rice	
129	13	April 6, 2018	Sodam-gil, Gongdeok-dong, Mapo District, Seoul	Lee Jeong-soon (72): Pollack soup; Kim Kyung-im (62) & Kwak Bok-soon (61): Kimchi-jjigae, Dak-bokkeum-tang; Shin Hee-soon (59): Spicy Grilled Baby Octopus, Seafood Soft Tofu Stew; Yoon Cheol-won (44): Lao Rice noodles; Celebrity guests Sayuri (38) & Andy (37) & Heo Kyung-hwan (37) & Lee Myung-hoon (29): Seafood Curry Soup, Curry Udon, Baked Curry Rice	Lee Myung-hoon joined as a waiter in the celebrity team.
130	14	April 13, 2018	Sodam-gil, Gongdeok-dong, Mapo District, Seoul	Lee Jeong-soon (72): Pollack soup; Kim Kyung-im (62) & Kwak Bok-soon (61): Kimchi-jjigae, Dak-bokkeum-tang; Shin Hee-soon (59): Spicy Grilled Baby Octopus, Seafood Soft Tofu Stew; Yoon Cheol-won (44): Lao Rice noodles; Celebrity guests Sayuri (38) & Andy (37) & Heo Kyung-hwan (37) & Lee Myung-hoon (29): Seafood Curry Soup, Curry Udon, Baked Curry Rice	
131	15	April 20, 2018	Sodam-gil, Gongdeok-dong, Mapo District, Seoul	Lee Jeong-soon (72): Pollack soup; Kim Kyung-im (62) & Kwak Bok-soon (61): Kimchi-jjigae, Dak-bokkeum-tang; Shin Hee-soon (59): Spicy Grilled Baby Octopus, Seafood Soft Tofu Stew; Yoon Cheol-won (44): Lao Rice noodles; Celebrity guests Sayuri (38) & Andy (37) & Heo Kyung-hwan (37) & Lee Myung-hoon (29): Seafood Curry Soup, Curry Udon, Baked Curry Rice	Special appearances as customer by Shinhwa (Eric Mun, Lee Min-woo) and SuperBee.
132	16	May 4, 2018	Sinheung Market, Haebangchon, Yongsan District, Seoul	Hwang Gyu-sang (67) & Goo Geum-sook (64): Grilled Saury, Sea pineapple Bibimbap, Raw Salmon Rice Bowl, Salted Pollack Roe Soup, Salted Pollack Roe Jjim Dongtae-jjigae, Abalone/Myeongnan Twigim, Agwi-jjim/Agwi-tang; Jung Bok-ja (64) & Kim Dae-hwan (36): Coconut-Vegetable / Cream-Shrimp / Beef / Pork / Half-half Curry dishes; Hong Seok-woo (39): Bokkeum-bap (Ham / Shrimp / Ham-Shrimp / Shrimp-Chicken, Mushroom), Bokkeum (Beef-Celery, Pork-Zha cai, Egg-Onion, Shrimp Chow mein), Twigim (Chicken & Lemon sauce, Beef & Mongolian sauce, Cream sauce / Chili sauce / Spicy sauce & Shrimp, Shrimp-Squid & Chow mein, Hot Spicy Eggplant); Kang Ji-young (28) & Kim Yoon-hee (28): Tofu Steak, Ratatouille Pasta, Fruit Pizza, Rose Tteok-bokki, Silgonyak Salad, Brunch, Cake; Celebrity guests Hwang Chi-yeul (35) & Nam Bo-ra (28): Sour cream-Chili meat sauce-Vegetable-Nurungji Burrito, Cheese-Bulgogi-Japchae Quesadilla	
133	17	May 11, 2018	Sinheung Market, Haebangchon, Yongsan District, Seoul		
134	18	May 18, 2018	Sinheung Market, Haebangchon, Yongsan District, Seoul		
135	19	May 25, 2018	Sinheung Market, Haebangchon, Yongsan District, Seoul		
136	20	June 1, 2018	Sinheung Market, Haebangchon, Yongsan District, Seoul		Special appearances as customer by Nam Bo-ra's co-stars in Sunny: Park Jin-joo, Kim Bo-mi and Kim Min-young.
137	21	June 8, 2018	Near Ttukseom station (an alley have a two-headed limit by Achasan-ro and Sangwon-2-gil; with a part of Sangwon-2-gil), Seongsu-dong, Seongdong District, Seoul	Hwang Geum-nyeo (58) & Kim Won-sik (34): Half-half (Classic/Spicy) Jokbal dishes, Pork/Beef Deopbap (Rice Bowl); Bae Myung-sung (41): Honey Lemon Salmon / Chicken Breast Salad; Jung Young-jin (33): Tonkatsu, Hamburg steak, Lemon Cream Chicken Steak; Park Byung-joon (30): Grilled seafood (Eel, Mackerel, Largehead hairtail), Blanched (Giant Octopus, Turbo cornutus); Celebrity guests Tei (35) & Bae Yoon-kyung (25): Cheeseburger, Bacon-Egg Burger, Krakenburger (Squid patty & Cheese & Squid ink bread), Egg Crew, Grape-Kale / Calamondin Juices	
138	22	June 15, 2018	Near Ttukseom station (an alley have a two-headed limit by Achasan-ro and Sangwon-2-gil; with a part of Sangwon-2-gil), Seongsu-dong, Seongdong District, Seoul		
139	23	June 29, 2018	Near Ttukseom station (an alley have a two-headed limit by Achasan-ro and Sangwon-2-gil; with a part of Sangwon-2-gil), Seongsu-dong, Seongdong District, Seoul		
140	24	July 13, 2018	Near Ttukseom station (an alley have a two-headed limit by Achasan-ro and Sangwon-2-gil; with a part of Sangwon-2-gil), Seongsu-dong, Seongdong District, Seoul		
141	25	July 20, 2018	Near Ttukseom station (an alley have a two-headed limit by Achasan-ro and Sangwon-2-gil; with a part of Sangwon-2-gil), Seongsu-dong, Seongdong District, Seoul		
142	26	July 27, 2018	Uhyeon-ro (alley 35 from main road and limited by alley 166 of Jemullyang-ro; included the Snow Flower Village), near Sinpo International Market, Sinpo-dong, Jung District, Incheon	Han Eun-mi (51) & Kim Seon-young (30): Donburi with Tempura; Kim Sung-man (38) & Park Min-young (35): Gimbap; Han Jin-seok (33) & Lee Sang-min (33): Spicy Pork Rice Twigim / Grilled Samgyeopsal Wrapped Mushroom; Park Jeong-young (28): Beef Steak; Park So-seul (26): Macaron; Kim Do-gyun (26): Takoyaki; Celebrity guests Kim Min-kyo (44) & Jung In-sun (27): Phat kaphrao moo (Thai basil pork)	
143	27	August 3, 2018	Uhyeon-ro (alley 35 from main road and limited by alley 166 of Jemullyang-ro; included the Snow Flower Village), near Sinpo International Market, Sinpo-dong, Jung District, Incheon	Han Eun-mi (51) & Kim Seon-young (30): Donburi with Tempura; Kim Sung-man (38) & Park Min-young (35): Gimbap; Han Jin-seok (33) & Lee Sang-min (33): Spicy Pork Rice Twigim / Grilled Samgyeopsal Wrapped Mushroom; Park Jeong-young (28): Beef Steak; Park So-seul (26): Macaron; Kim Do-gyun (26): Takoyaki; Celebrity guests Kim Min-kyo (44) & Jung In-sun (27): Phat kaphrao moo (Thai basil pork)	
144	28	August 10, 2018	Uhyeon-ro (alley 35 from main road and limited by alley 166 of Jemullyang-ro; included the Snow Flower Village), near Sinpo International Market, Sinpo-dong, Jung District, Incheon	Han Eun-mi (51) & Kim Seon-young (30): Donburi with Tempura; Kim Sung-man (38) & Park Min-young (35): Gimbap; Han Jin-seok (33) & Lee Sang-min (33): Spicy Pork Rice Twigim / Grilled Samgyeopsal Wrapped Mushroom; Park Jeong-young (28): Beef Steak; Park So-seul (26): Macaron; Kim Do-gyun (26): Takoyaki; Celebrity guests Kim Min-kyo (44) & Jung In-sun (27): Phat kaphrao moo (Thai basil pork)	
145	29	August 17, 2018	Uhyeon-ro (alley 35 from main road and limited by alley 166 of Jemullyang-ro; included the Snow Flower Village), near Sinpo International Market, Sinpo-dong, Jung District, Incheon	Han Eun-mi (51) & Kim Seon-young (30): Donburi with Tempura; Kim Sung-man (38) & Park Min-young (35): Gimbap; Han Jin-seok (33) & Lee Sang-min (33): Spicy Pork Rice Twigim / Grilled Samgyeopsal Wrapped Mushroom; Park Jeong-young (28): Beef Steak; Park So-seul (26): Macaron; Kim Do-gyun (26): Takoyaki; Celebrity guests Kim Min-kyo (44) & Jung In-sun (27): Phat kaphrao moo (Thai basil pork)	
146	30	August 29, 2018	Restaurant area in "청년구단" building (surrounded by Daeheung-ro with Jungang-ro's alley 200 and 204), Won-dong, Dong District, Daejeon	Hwang In-cheon (41): Sushi; Park Yoo-deok (30): Makgeolli with side dishes; Kang Hee-joon (29): Western foods (Pasta, Pizza, Tonkatsu); Yoo Jong-sung (28) & Kim Do-il (24): Rice bowl with toppings; Jang Min-wook (27) & Kim Hee-soo (23): Burgers	
147	31	September 5, 2018	Restaurant area in "청년구단" building (surrounded by Daeheung-ro with Jungang-ro's alley 200 and 204), Won-dong, Dong District, Daejeon	Hwang In-cheon (41): Sushi; Park Yoo-deok (30): Makgeolli with side dishes; Kang Hee-joon (29): Western foods (Pasta, Pizza, Tonkatsu); Yoo Jong-sung (28) & Kim Do-il (24): Rice bowl with toppings; Jang Min-wook (27) & Kim Hee-soo (23): Burgers	
148	32	September 12, 2018	Restaurant area in "청년구단" building (surrounded by Daeheung-ro with Jungang-ro's alley 200 and 204), Won-dong, Dong District, Daejeon	Hwang In-cheon (41): Sushi; Park Yoo-deok (30): Makgeolli with side dishes; Kang Hee-joon (29): Western foods (Pasta, Pizza, Tonkatsu); Yoo Jong-sung (28) & Kim Do-il (24): Rice bowl with toppings; Jang Min-wook (27) & Kim Hee-soo (23): Burgers	
149	33	September 26, 2018	Restaurant area in "청년구단" building (surrounded by Daeheung-ro with Jungang-ro's alley 200 and 204), Won-dong, Dong District, Daejeon	Hwang In-cheon (41): Sushi; Park Yoo-deok (30): Makgeolli with side dishes; Kang Hee-joon (29): Western foods (Pasta, Pizza, Tonkatsu); Yoo Jong-sung (28) & Kim Do-il (24): Rice bowl with toppings; Jang Min-wook (27) & Kim Hee-soo (23): Burgers	
150	34	October 3, 2018	Restaurant area in "청년구단" building (surrounded by Daeheung-ro with Jungang-ro's alley 200 and 204), Won-dong, Dong District, Daejeon	Hwang In-cheon (41): Sushi; Park Yoo-deok (30): Makgeolli with side dishes; Kang Hee-joon (29): Western foods (Pasta, Pizza, Tonkatsu); Yoo Jong-sung (28) & Kim Do-il (24): Rice bowl with toppings; Jang Min-wook (27) & Kim Hee-soo (23): Burgers	
151	35	October 10, 2018	Sang-an Village Gangpul Cartoon Street in Seongnae-dong, Gangdong District, Seoul	Kim Joon-tae & Kwon Ki-chul: Fusion pasta; Park Byung-joon: Jjajangmyeon, Champon, Sweet and sour pork; Kim Yeon-ye: Snack bar, Ramen, Tteokbokki; Kim Bong-seok: Pizza, Beer	
152	36	October 17, 2018	Sang-an Village Gangpul Cartoon Street in Seongnae-dong, Gangdong District, Seoul	Kim Joon-tae & Kwon Ki-chul: Fusion pasta; Park Byung-joon: Jjajangmyeon, Champon, Sweet and sour pork; Kim Yeon-ye: Snack bar, Ramen, Tteokbokki; Kim Bong-seok: Pizza, Beer	
153	37	October 24, 2018	Sang-an Village Gangpul Cartoon Street in Seongnae-dong, Gangdong District, Seoul	Kim Joon-tae & Kwon Ki-chul: Fusion pasta; Park Byung-joon: Jjajangmyeon, Champon, Sweet and sour pork; Kim Yeon-ye: Snack bar, Ramen, Tteokbokki; Kim Bong-seok: Pizza, Beer	
154	38	October 31, 2018	Sang-an Village Gangpul Cartoon Street in Seongnae-dong, Gangdong District, Seoul	Kim Joon-tae & Kwon Ki-chul: Fusion pasta; Park Byung-joon: Jjajangmyeon, Champon, Sweet and sour pork; Kim Yeon-ye: Snack bar, Ramen, Tteokbokki; Kim Bong-seok: Pizza, Beer	
155	39	November 7, 2018	Fortune Market in Hongeun-dong, Seodaemun District, Seoul	Oh Ji-yeol & Ahn Ok-ok: Makchang; Na Young-deok & Kwon Sang-hoon: Fried chicken, Soup; Kim Eung-soo & Kim So-yeon: Tonkatsu; Cho Min-sik & Cho Yoon-sik: Octopus, Pork BBQ, Miso soup	
156	40	November 14, 2018	Fortune Market in Hongeun-dong, Seodaemun District, Seoul	Oh Ji-yeol & Ahn Ok-ok: Makchang; Na Young-deok & Kwon Sang-hoon: Fried chicken, Soup; Kim Eung-soo & Kim So-yeon: Tonkatsu; Cho Min-sik & Cho Yoon-sik: Octopus, Pork BBQ, Miso soup	
157	41	November 21, 2018	Fortune Market in Hongeun-dong, Seodaemun District, Seoul	Oh Ji-yeol & Ahn Ok-ok: Makchang; Na Young-deok & Kwon Sang-hoon: Fried chicken, Soup; Kim Eung-soo & Kim So-yeon: Tonkatsu; Cho Min-sik & Cho Yoon-sik: Octopus, Pork BBQ, Miso soup	
158	42	November 28, 2018	Fortune Market in Hongeun-dong, Seodaemun District, Seoul	Oh Ji-yeol & Ahn Ok-ok: Makchang; Na Young-deok & Kwon Sang-hoon: Fried chicken, Soup; Kim Eung-soo & Kim So-yeon: Tonkatsu; Cho Min-sik & Cho Yoon-sik: Octopus, Pork BBQ, Miso soup	
159	43	December 5, 2018	Fortune Market in Hongeun-dong, Seodaemun District, Seoul	Oh Ji-yeol & Ahn Ok-ok: Makchang; Na Young-deok & Kwon Sang-hoon: Fried chicken, Soup; Kim Eung-soo & Kim So-yeon: Tonkatsu; Cho Min-sik & Cho Yoon-sik: Octopus, Pork BBQ, Miso soup	Special appearances as customer by Astro (JinJin, Moonbin), Iz*One (Jo Yu-ri, Nako Yabuki, Kwon Eun-bi).
160	44	December 12, 2018	Fortune Market in Hongeun-dong, Seodaemun District, Seoul	Oh Ji-yeol & Ahn Ok-ok: Makchang; Na Young-deok & Kwon Sang-hoon: Fried chicken, Soup; Kim Eung-soo & Kim So-yeon: Tonkatsu; Cho Min-sik & Cho Yoon-sik: Octopus, Pork BBQ, Miso soup	
161	45	December 19, 2018	Boarding House Alleys in Cheongpa-dong, Yongsan District, Seoul	Hwang Ho-joon: Pizza; Jeong Seong-geun: Burger; Jung Bok-joo & Jang Tak-han: Naengmyeon, Galbi-tang; Kim Yo-seb: Croquette	
162	46	December 26, 2018	Boarding House Alleys in Cheongpa-dong, Yongsan District, Seoul	Hwang Ho-joon: Pizza; Jeong Seong-geun: Burger; Jung Bok-joo & Jang Tak-han: Naengmyeon, Galbi-tang; Kim Yo-seb: Croquette	

=== 2019 ===
List of episodes in 2019 (episode 47–98)

#	Episode #	Broadcast Date	Alley(s) Position	Restaurant owner/chef and main dish(es)	Remark
163	47	January 2, 2019	Boarding House Alleys in Cheongpa-dong, Yongsan District, Seoul	Hwang Ho-joon: Pizza; Jeong Seong-geun: Burger; Jung Bok-joo & Jang Tak-han: Naengmyeon, Galbi-tang; Kim Yo-seb: Croquette	
164	48	January 9, 2019	Boarding House Alleys in Cheongpa-dong, Yongsan District, Seoul	Hwang Ho-joon: Pizza; Jeong Seong-geun: Burger; Jung Bok-joo & Jang Tak-han: Naengmyeon, Galbi-tang; Kim Yo-seb: Croquette	
165	49	January 16, 2019	Boarding House Alleys in Cheongpa-dong, Yongsan District, Seoul	Hwang Ho-joon: Pizza; Jeong Seong-geun: Burger; Jung Bok-joo & Jang Tak-han: Naengmyeon, Galbi-tang; Kim Yo-seb: Croquette	Special appearances as customer by AOA (Jimin, Chanmi).
166	50	January 23, 2019	Mural Alleys in Hoegi-dong, Dongdaemun District, Seoul	Park Hyo-bin (39): Pizza & Pasta; Kim Sang-beom (43) & Yoon Young-jin (42): Gamja-tang, Dak-bokkeum-tang, Jjimdak; Kang Do-hoon & Jang Young-joo: BBQ, Galbi-tang, Yukgaejang; Lee Jae-in (39) & Won Yun-bok (37): Rice Cup (Spicy stir-fried pork, Hot chicken, Chicken mayo)	
167	51	January 30, 2019	Mural Alleys in Hoegi-dong, Dongdaemun District, Seoul	Park Hyo-bin (39): Pizza & Pasta; Kim Sang-beom (43) & Yoon Young-jin (42): Gamja-tang, Dak-bokkeum-tang, Jjimdak; Kang Do-hoon & Jang Young-joo: BBQ, Galbi-tang, Yukgaejang; Lee Jae-in (39) & Won Yun-bok (37): Rice Cup (Spicy stir-fried pork, Hot chicken, Chicken mayo)	
168	52	February 6, 2019	Mural Alleys in Hoegi-dong, Dongdaemun District, Seoul	Park Hyo-bin (39): Pizza & Pasta; Kim Sang-beom (43) & Yoon Young-jin (42): Gamja-tang, Dak-bokkeum-tang, Jjimdak; Kang Do-hoon & Jang Young-joo: BBQ, Galbi-tang, Yukgaejang; Lee Jae-in (39) & Won Yun-bok (37): Rice Cup (Spicy stir-fried pork, Hot chicken, Chicken mayo)	
169	53	February 13, 2019	Mural Alleys in Hoegi-dong, Dongdaemun District, Seoul	Park Hyo-bin (39): Pizza & Pasta; Kim Sang-beom (43) & Yoon Young-jin (42): Gamja-tang, Dak-bokkeum-tang, Jjimdak; Kang Do-hoon & Jang Young-joo: BBQ, Galbi-tang, Yukgaejang; Lee Jae-in (39) & Won Yun-bok (37): Rice Cup (Spicy stir-fried pork, Hot chicken, Chicken mayo)	Special appearance as customer by Crush.
170	54	February 20, 2019	Mural Alleys in Hoegi-dong, Dongdaemun District, Seoul	Park Hyo-bin (39): Pizza & Pasta; Kim Sang-beom (43) & Yoon Young-jin (42): Gamja-tang, Dak-bokkeum-tang, Jjimdak; Kang Do-hoon & Jang Young-joo: BBQ, Galbi-tang, Yukgaejang; Lee Jae-in (39) & Won Yun-bok (37): Rice Cup (Spicy stir-fried pork, Hot chicken, Chicken mayo)	Special appearances as customer by Cha Eun-woo (Astro), SF9 (Dawon, Chani), Fromis 9 (Song Ha-young, Lee Na-gyung, Jang Gyu-ri), Nature (Saebom, Loha, Uchae).
171	55	February 27, 2019	Jisepo Port in Geoje, South Gyeongsang Province	Kim Mi-jung (53): Chungmu-gimbap; Na Soon-nyeo (60): Barrley Rice (Boribap), Pollack Jjim; Jung Sook-hee (50): Dosirak, Gimbap	
172	56	March 6, 2019	Jisepo Port in Geoje, South Gyeongsang Province	Kim Mi-jung (53): Chungmu-gimbap; Na Soon-nyeo (60): Barrley Rice (Boribap), Pollack Jjim; Jung Sook-hee (50): Dosirak, Gimbap	
173	57	March 13, 2019	Jisepo Port in Geoje, South Gyeongsang Province	Kim Mi-jung (53): Chungmu-gimbap; Na Soon-nyeo (60): Barrley Rice (Boribap), Pollack Jjim; Jung Sook-hee (50): Dosirak, Gimbap	
174	58	March 20, 2019	Jisepo Port in Geoje, South Gyeongsang Province	Kim Mi-jung (53): Chungmu-gimbap; Na Soon-nyeo (60): Barrley Rice (Boribap), Pollack Jjim; Jung Sook-hee (50): Dosirak, Gimbap	Special appearances as tasters by Seventeen (Mingyu, Vernon).
175	59	March 27, 2019	Jisepo Port in Geoje, South Gyeongsang Province	Kim Mi-jung (53): Chungmu-gimbap; Na Soon-nyeo (60): Barrley Rice (Boribap), Pollack Jjim; Jung Sook-hee (50): Dosirak, Gimbap	Guest appearance by Andy (Shinhwa).; Special appearance as customer by Kang San-ae.; Co-host Jo Bo-ah's last episode.
176	60	April 3, 2019	Alley in front of Haemieupseong Fortress, Seosan, South Chungcheong Province	Kim Su-chul (60) & Kim Chun-ok (55): Gopchang, Jeongol; Lee Choong-gi (53): Pork Jjigae; Kim Jung-nyo (62): Rib Kimchi-jjigae	Jung In-sun joined as co-host.
177	61	April 10, 2019	Alley in front of Haemieupseong Fortress, Seosan, South Chungcheong Province	Kim Su-chul (60) & Kim Chun-ok (55): Gopchang, Jeongol; Lee Choong-gi (53): Pork Jjigae; Kim Jung-nyo (62): Rib Kimchi-jjigae	
178	62	April 17, 2019	Alley in front of Haemieupseong Fortress, Seosan, South Chungcheong Province	Kim Su-chul (60) & Kim Chun-ok (55): Gopchang, Jeongol; Lee Choong-gi (53): Pork Jjigae; Kim Jung-nyo (62): Rib Kimchi-jjigae	
179	63	April 24, 2019	Alley in front of Haemieupseong Fortress, Seosan, South Chungcheong Province	Kim Su-chul (60) & Kim Chun-ok (55): Gopchang, Jeongol; Lee Choong-gi (53): Pork Jjigae; Kim Jung-nyo (62): Rib Kimchi-jjigae	Special appearances as customer by Hong Hyun-hee, Kim Na-hee.
180	64	May 1, 2019	Alley in front of Haemieupseong Fortress, Seosan, South Chungcheong Province	Kim Su-chul (60) & Kim Chun-ok (55): Gopchang, Jeongol; Lee Choong-gi (53): Pork Jjigae; Kim Jung-nyo (62): Rib Kimchi-jjigae	Special appearances as customer by Kwon Hyuk-soo, Yoo Young-jae.
181	65	May 8, 2019	Ggumdderak Mall in Yeosu, South Jeolla Province	Jeong Chang-ho (36): Burgers; Jung Da-eun (29): Takoyaki; Kim Bee (41) & Bang Ki-ho (39): Steak & Pasta; Yeo Jeong-won: Tonkatsu; Jeong Jin-yong: Ramyeon; Moon Jae-yoon (30): Skewers (Chicken, Octopus, Sausage & Rice Cake, Pigs Heart)	
182	66	May 15, 2019	Ggumdderak Mall in Yeosu, South Jeolla Province	Jeong Chang-ho (36): Burgers; Jung Da-eun (29): Takoyaki; Kim Bee (41) & Bang Ki-ho (39): Steak & Pasta; Yeo Jeong-won: Tonkatsu; Jeong Jin-yong: Ramyeon; Moon Jae-yoon (30): Skewers (Chicken, Octopus, Sausage & Rice Cake, Pigs Heart)	
183	67	May 22, 2019	Ggumdderak Mall in Yeosu, South Jeolla Province	Jeong Chang-ho (36): Burgers; Jung Da-eun (29): Takoyaki; Kim Bee (41) & Bang Ki-ho (39): Steak & Pasta; Yeo Jeong-won: Tonkatsu; Jeong Jin-yong: Ramyeon; Moon Jae-yoon (30): Skewers (Chicken, Octopus, Sausage & Rice Cake, Pigs Heart)	
184	68	May 29, 2019	Ggumdderak Mall in Yeosu, South Jeolla Province	Jeong Chang-ho (36): Burgers; Jung Da-eun (29): Takoyaki; Kim Bee (41) & Bang Ki-ho (39): Steak & Pasta; Yeo Jeong-won: Tonkatsu; Jeong Jin-yong: Ramyeon; Moon Jae-yoon (30): Skewers (Chicken, Octopus, Sausage & Rice Cake, Pigs Heart)	
185	69	June 5, 2019	Ggumdderak Mall in Yeosu, South Jeolla Province	Jeong Chang-ho (36): Burgers; Jung Da-eun (29): Takoyaki; Kim Bee (41) & Bang Ki-ho (39): Steak & Pasta; Yeo Jeong-won: Tonkatsu; Jeong Jin-yong: Ramyeon; Moon Jae-yoon (30): Skewers (Chicken, Octopus, Sausage & Rice Cake, Pigs Heart)	
186	70	June 12, 2019	Ggumdderak Mall in Yeosu, South Jeolla Province	Jeong Chang-ho (36): Burgers; Jung Da-eun (29): Takoyaki; Kim Bee (41) & Bang Ki-ho (39): Steak & Pasta; Yeo Jeong-won: Tonkatsu; Jeong Jin-yong: Ramyeon; Moon Jae-yoon (30): Skewers (Chicken, Octopus, Sausage & Rice Cake, Pigs Heart)	
187	71	June 19, 2019	Labyrinth Market in Wonju, Gangwon Province	Won Sang-gi (75): Kal-guksu, Sujebi; Lee Chang-hoon (38): Steak; Kim Pan-soo (43) & Hwang Eun-ji (32): Taco, Burrito, Quesadilla; Lee In-bae (31) & Lee Ho-seon (31): Katsudon & Ebidon	
188	72	June 26, 2019	Labyrinth Market in Wonju, Gangwon Province	Won Sang-gi (75): Kal-guksu, Sujebi; Lee Chang-hoon (38): Steak; Kim Pan-soo (43) & Hwang Eun-ji (32): Taco, Burrito, Quesadilla; Lee In-bae (31) & Lee Ho-seon (31): Katsudon & Ebidon	
189	73	July 3, 2019	Labyrinth Market in Wonju, Gangwon Province	Won Sang-gi (75): Kal-guksu, Sujebi; Lee Chang-hoon (38): Steak; Kim Pan-soo (43) & Hwang Eun-ji (32): Taco, Burrito, Quesadilla; Lee In-bae (31) & Lee Ho-seon (31): Katsudon & Ebidon	
190	74	July 10, 2019	Labyrinth Market in Wonju, Gangwon Province	Won Sang-gi (75): Kal-guksu, Sujebi; Lee Chang-hoon (38): Steak; Kim Pan-soo (43) & Hwang Eun-ji (32): Taco, Burrito, Quesadilla; Lee In-bae (31) & Lee Ho-seon (31): Katsudon & Ebidon	
191	75	July 17, 2019	Labyrinth Market in Wonju, Gangwon Province	Won Sang-gi (75): Kal-guksu, Sujebi; Lee Chang-hoon (38): Steak; Kim Pan-soo (43) & Hwang Eun-ji (32): Taco, Burrito, Quesadilla; Lee In-bae (31) & Lee Ho-seon (31): Katsudon & Ebidon	Special appearances as customer by Jay Park, Haon.
192	76	July 24, 2019	Labyrinth Market in Wonju, Gangwon Province	Won Sang-gi (75): Kal-guksu, Sujebi; Lee Chang-hoon (38): Steak; Kim Pan-soo (43) & Hwang Eun-ji (32): Taco, Burrito, Quesadilla; Lee In-bae (31) & Lee Ho-seon (31): Katsudon & Ebidon	
192	76	July 24, 2019		Na Young-deok & Kwon Sang-hoon: Fried chicken, Soup; Park Yoo-deok (30): Makgeolli with side dishes; Yoo Jong-sung (28) & Kim Do-il (24): Rice bowl with toppings; Kim Yeon-ye: Snack bar, Ramen, Tteokbokki; Kim Min-kyo (44): Phat kaphrao moo (Thai basil pork); Lee Sang-cheol (60) & Hong Choon-gi (63): Stir-fried Spicy Pork, (Spicy/Curry) Soft Tofu Stew; Kim Eung-soo & Kim So-yeon: Tonkatsu	Special Emergency Inspection.
193	77	July 31, 2019		Na Young-deok & Kwon Sang-hoon: Fried chicken, Soup; Park Yoo-deok (30): Makgeolli with side dishes; Yoo Jong-sung (28) & Kim Do-il (24): Rice bowl with toppings; Kim Yeon-ye: Snack bar, Ramen, Tteokbokki; Kim Min-kyo (44): Phat kaphrao moo (Thai basil pork); Lee Sang-cheol (60) & Hong Choon-gi (63): Stir-fried Spicy Pork, (Spicy/Curry) Soft Tofu Stew; Kim Eung-soo & Kim So-yeon: Tonkatsu	Special Emergency Inspection.
194	78	August 7, 2019		Na Young-deok & Kwon Sang-hoon: Fried chicken, Soup; Park Yoo-deok (30): Makgeolli with side dishes; Yoo Jong-sung (28) & Kim Do-il (24): Rice bowl with toppings; Kim Yeon-ye: Snack bar, Ramen, Tteokbokki; Kim Min-kyo (44): Phat kaphrao moo (Thai basil pork); Lee Sang-cheol (60) & Hong Choon-gi (63): Stir-fried Spicy Pork, (Spicy/Curry) Soft Tofu Stew; Kim Eung-soo & Kim So-yeon: Tonkatsu	Special Emergency Inspection.
195	79	August 14, 2019	College Street in Bucheon, Gyeonggi Province	Oh Seung-rok (37) & Oh Mun-jeong (39) & Noh Eun-jeong (37): Chinese Tteokbokki, Salad, Boneless fried chicken, Pasta; Park Soo-kyung: Chicken Kal-guksu, Bibim-guksu, Jjolmyeon, Naengmyeon; Lee Chang-hoon (27) & Lee Tae-hoon (21): Long Pizza	
196	80	August 21, 2019	College Street in Bucheon, Gyeonggi Province	Oh Seung-rok (37) & Oh Mun-jeong (39) & Noh Eun-jeong (37): Chinese Tteokbokki, Salad, Boneless fried chicken, Pasta; Park Soo-kyung: Chicken Kal-guksu, Bibim-guksu, Jjolmyeon, Naengmyeon; Lee Chang-hoon (27) & Lee Tae-hoon (21): Long Pizza	
197	81	August 28, 2019	College Street in Bucheon, Gyeonggi Province	Oh Seung-rok (37) & Oh Mun-jeong (39) & Noh Eun-jeong (37): Chinese Tteokbokki, Salad, Boneless fried chicken, Pasta; Park Soo-kyung: Chicken Kal-guksu, Bibim-guksu, Jjolmyeon, Naengmyeon; Lee Chang-hoon (27) & Lee Tae-hoon (21): Long Pizza	
198	82	September 4, 2019	College Street in Bucheon, Gyeonggi Province	Oh Seung-rok (37) & Oh Mun-jeong (39) & Noh Eun-jeong (37): Chinese Tteokbokki, Salad, Boneless fried chicken, Pasta; Park Soo-kyung: Chicken Kal-guksu, Bibim-guksu, Jjolmyeon, Naengmyeon; Lee Chang-hoon (27) & Lee Tae-hoon (21): Long Pizza	Special appearance as customer by Kyuhyun (Super Junior).; Special appearance as delivery man Kim Yoon-sang.
199	83	September 11, 2019	College Street in Bucheon, Gyeonggi Province	Oh Seung-rok (37) & Oh Mun-jeong (39) & Noh Eun-jeong (37): Chinese Tteokbokki, Salad, Boneless fried chicken, Pasta; Park Soo-kyung: Chicken Kal-guksu, Bibim-guksu, Jjolmyeon, Naengmyeon; Lee Chang-hoon (27) & Lee Tae-hoon (21): Long Pizza	Special appearances as customer by Simon Dominic, Code Kunst.
200	84	September 18, 2019	Alleys in Dunchon-dong, Gangdong District, Seoul	Han Wan-hee (62): Dak-galbi; Shin Hoo-joon (40) & Kim Eun-seon (38): Tonkatsu, Hamburg steak; Kim Su-jeong (53) & Yoon Seong (32) & Kim Bo-mi (30): Soba, Tonkatsu; Jeon Byung-yoon (39) & Kim Jung-hwa (39): Sushi	
201	85	September 25, 2019	Alleys in Dunchon-dong, Gangdong District, Seoul	Han Wan-hee (62): Dak-galbi; Shin Hoo-joon (40) & Kim Eun-seon (38): Tonkatsu, Hamburg steak; Kim Su-jeong (53) & Yoon Seong (32) & Kim Bo-mi (30): Soba, Tonkatsu; Jeon Byung-yoon (39) & Kim Jung-hwa (39): Sushi	
202	86	October 2, 2019	Alleys in Dunchon-dong, Gangdong District, Seoul	Han Wan-hee (62): Dak-galbi; Shin Hoo-joon (40) & Kim Eun-seon (38): Tonkatsu, Hamburg steak; Kim Su-jeong (53) & Yoon Seong (32) & Kim Bo-mi (30): Soba, Tonkatsu; Jeon Byung-yoon (39) & Kim Jung-hwa (39): Sushi	The shoot for the dakgalbi restaurant ends.
203	87	October 9, 2019	Alleys in Dunchon-dong, Gangdong District, Seoul	Han Wan-hee (62): Dak-galbi; Shin Hoo-joon (40) & Kim Eun-seon (38): Tonkatsu, Hamburg steak; Kim Su-jeong (53) & Yoon Seong (32) & Kim Bo-mi (30): Soba, Tonkatsu; Jeon Byung-yoon (39) & Kim Jung-hwa (39): Sushi	Special appearance as delivery man Kim Yoon-sang.
204	88	October 16, 2019	Alleys in Dunchon-dong, Gangdong District, Seoul	Han Wan-hee (62): Dak-galbi; Shin Hoo-joon (40) & Kim Eun-seon (38): Tonkatsu, Hamburg steak; Kim Su-jeong (53) & Yoon Seong (32) & Kim Bo-mi (30): Soba, Tonkatsu; Jeon Byung-yoon (39) & Kim Jung-hwa (39): Sushi	Guest appearance by Andy (Shinhwa).; Special appearances as customer by Norazo, Hong Yoon-hwa.
205	89	October 23, 2019	Arirang Market in Jeongneung-dong, Seongbuk District, Seoul	Jeong Sook-hee (41) & Jeong Eun-jung (39): Jeon; Jeon Eun-jeong (50) & Shim Geun-seop (28): Hamburg steak; Kim An-soon: Jorim	
206	90	October 30, 2019	Arirang Market in Jeongneung-dong, Seongbuk District, Seoul	Jeong Sook-hee (41) & Jeong Eun-jung (39): Jeon; Jeon Eun-jeong (50) & Shim Geun-seop (28): Hamburg steak; Kim An-soon: Jorim	
207	91	November 6, 2019	Arirang Market in Jeongneung-dong, Seongbuk District, Seoul	Jeong Sook-hee (41) & Jeong Eun-jung (39): Jeon; Jeon Eun-jeong (50) & Shim Geun-seop (28): Hamburg steak; Kim An-soon: Jorim	
208	92	November 13, 2019	Arirang Market in Jeongneung-dong, Seongbuk District, Seoul	Jeong Sook-hee (41) & Jeong Eun-jung (39): Jeon; Jeon Eun-jeong (50) & Shim Geun-seop (28): Hamburg steak; Kim An-soon: Jorim	Special appearances as customer by Park Sang-myun, Mamamoo (Solar, Moonbyul).
209	93	November 20, 2019	Back Alleys Pyeongtaek Station in Pyeongtaek, Gyeonggi Province	Kim Jeong-ok (62): Tonkatsu, Kimchi fried rice; Jin Seung-ja (62): Tteokbokki; Lee Yeong-ja (71) & Sim Hyun-jeong (41): Guksu, Gimbap	
210	94	November 27, 2019	Back Alleys Pyeongtaek Station in Pyeongtaek, Gyeonggi Province	Kim Jeong-ok (62): Tonkatsu, Kimchi fried rice; Jin Seung-ja (62): Tteokbokki; Lee Yeong-ja (71) & Sim Hyun-jeong (41): Guksu, Gimbap	
211	95	December 4, 2019	Back Alleys Pyeongtaek Station in Pyeongtaek, Gyeonggi Province	Kim Jeong-ok (62): Tonkatsu, Kimchi fried rice; Jin Seung-ja (62): Tteokbokki; Lee Yeong-ja (71) & Sim Hyun-jeong (41): Guksu, Gimbap	
212	96	December 11, 2019	Back Alleys Pyeongtaek Station in Pyeongtaek, Gyeonggi Province	Kim Jeong-ok (62): Tonkatsu, Kimchi fried rice; Jin Seung-ja (62): Tteokbokki; Lee Yeong-ja (71) & Sim Hyun-jeong (41): Guksu, Gimbap	Special appearances as customer by Brian Joo (Fly to the Sky), Heize.
213	97	December 18, 2019		Kim Eung-soo & Kim So-yeon: Tonkatsu; Na Young-deok & Kwon Sang-hoon: Fried chicken, Soup; Kim Mi-jung (53): Chungmu-gimbap; Na Soon-nyeo (60): Barrley Rice(Boribap), Pollack Jjim; Jung Sook-hee (50): Dosirak, Gimbap	Special Winter Emergency Inspection.
214	98	December 25, 2019		Kim Eung-soo & Kim So-yeon: Tonkatsu; Na Young-deok & Kwon Sang-hoon: Fried chicken, Soup; Kim Mi-jung (53): Chungmu-gimbap; Na Soon-nyeo (60): Barrley Rice(Boribap), Pollack Jjim; Jung Sook-hee (50): Dosirak, Gimbap	Special Winter Emergency Inspection.

=== 2020 ===
List of episodes in 2020 (episode 99–150)

#	Episode #	Broadcast Date	Alley(s) Position	Restaurant owner/chef and main dish(es)	Remark
215	99	January 1, 2020		Kim Eung-soo & Kim So-yeon: Tonkatsu; Kim Mi-jung (53): Chungmu-gimbap; Na Soon-nyeo (60): Barley Rice (Boribap), Pollack Jjim; Jung Sook-hee (50): Dosirak, Gimbap	Special Winter Emergency Inspection.
216	100	January 8, 2020		Kim Eung-soo & Kim So-yeon: Tonkatsu; Kim Mi-jung (53): Chungmu-gimbap; Na Soon-nyeo (60): Barley Rice (Boribap), Pollack Jjim; Jung Sook-hee (50): Dosirak, Gimbap	Special Winter Emergency Inspection.
217	101	January 15, 2020	Alleys Cultural Village in Hongje-dong, Seodaemun District, Seoul	Hwang Young-sook (59) & Ahn Gi-tae (38): Gamja-tang; Kim Hye-sook & Jung In-woo: Red Bean Kal-guksu; Choi Kyung-hee (66) & Han Hee-seok (61): Chicken	
218	102	January 22, 2020	Alleys Cultural Village in Hongje-dong, Seodaemun District, Seoul	Hwang Young-sook (59) & Ahn Gi-tae (38): Gamja-tang; Kim Hye-sook & Jung In-woo: Red Bean Kal-guksu; Choi Kyung-hee (66) & Han Hee-seok (61): Chicken	
219	103	January 29, 2020	Alleys Cultural Village in Hongje-dong, Seodaemun District, Seoul	Hwang Young-sook (59) & Ahn Gi-tae (38): Gamja-tang; Kim Hye-sook & Jung In-woo: Red Bean Kal-guksu; Choi Kyung-hee (66) & Han Hee-seok (61): Chicken	
220	104	February 5, 2020	Alleys Cultural Village in Hongje-dong, Seodaemun District, Seoul	Hwang Young-sook (59) & Ahn Gi-tae (38): Gamja-tang; Kim Hye-sook & Jung In-woo: Red Bean Kal-guksu; Choi Kyung-hee (66) & Han Hee-seok (61): Chicken	Special appearances as customer by Yook Joong-wan, Gray, Woo Won-jae.
221	105	February 12, 2020	Railway Alley in Gongneung-dong, Nowon District, Seoul	Jo Eun-hwa (47): Samgyeopsal; Park Jong-goo (57) & Kim Kyung-ae (57): Gopchang; Jeon Hui-ja (60) & Lee Mi-ran (37): Jjigae	These alleys shot before COVID-19 pandemic.
222	106	February 19, 2020	Railway Alley in Gongneung-dong, Nowon District, Seoul	Jo Eun-hwa (47): Samgyeopsal; Park Jong-goo (57) & Kim Kyung-ae (57): Gopchang; Jeon Hui-ja (60) & Lee Mi-ran (37): Jjigae	
223	107	February 26, 2020	Railway Alley in Gongneung-dong, Nowon District, Seoul	Jo Eun-hwa (47): Samgyeopsal; Park Jong-goo (57) & Kim Kyung-ae (57): Gopchang; Jeon Hui-ja (60) & Lee Mi-ran (37): Jjigae	
224	108	March 4, 2020	Railway Alley in Gongneung-dong, Nowon District, Seoul	Jo Eun-hwa (47): Samgyeopsal; Park Jong-goo (57) & Kim Kyung-ae (57): Gopchang; Jeon Hui-ja (60) & Lee Mi-ran (37): Jjigae	Special appearance as customer by Hong Jin-young.
225	109	March 11, 2020	Railway Alley in Gongneung-dong, Nowon District, Seoul	Jo Eun-hwa (47): Samgyeopsal; Park Jong-goo (57) & Kim Kyung-ae (57): Gopchang; Jeon Hui-ja (60) & Lee Mi-ran (37): Jjigae	Special appearance as customer by Chan Sung Jung.
226	110	March 18, 2020		Jung Bok-joo & Jang Tak-han: Naengmyeon, Galbi-tang; Park So-seul (26): Macaron; Kim Sung-man (38) & Park Min-young (35): Gimbap; Won Sang-gi (75): Kal-guksu, Sujebi	Special Crisis Management.
227	111	March 25, 2020	Gunpo Station Market in Gunpo, Gyeonggi Province	Lee Jeong-ahn (39): Tteokbokki, Beer; Jang Geum-dong (55) & Lee Jeong-ja (51): Chicken BBQ, Spicy Makchang; Shin Oh-kyun (59) & Kim Mi-ja (55): Jokbal	
228	112	April 1, 2020	Gunpo Station Market in Gunpo, Gyeonggi Province	Lee Jeong-ahn (39): Tteokbokki, Beer; Jang Geum-dong (55) & Lee Jeong-ja (51): Chicken BBQ, Spicy Makchang; Shin Oh-kyun (59) & Kim Mi-ja (55): Jokbal	
229	113	April 8, 2020	Gunpo Station Market in Gunpo, Gyeonggi Province	Lee Jeong-ahn (39): Tteokbokki, Beer; Jang Geum-dong (55) & Lee Jeong-ja (51): Chicken BBQ, Spicy Makchang; Shin Oh-kyun (59) & Kim Mi-ja (55): Jokbal	
230	114	April 22, 2020	Gunpo Station Market in Gunpo, Gyeonggi Province	Lee Jeong-ahn (39): Tteokbokki, Beer; Jang Geum-dong (55) & Lee Jeong-ja (51): Chicken BBQ, Spicy Makchang; Shin Oh-kyun (59) & Kim Mi-ja (55): Jokbal	Special appearance as customer by Ahn Bo-hyun.
231	115	April 29, 2020	Gunpo Station Market in Gunpo, Gyeonggi Province	Lee Jeong-ahn (39): Tteokbokki, Beer; Jang Geum-dong (55) & Lee Jeong-ja (51): Chicken BBQ, Spicy Makchang; Shin Oh-kyun (59) & Kim Mi-ja (55): Jokbal	Special appearances as customer by Noel, Ahn Bo-hyun.
232	116	May 6, 2020	Alleys in Jeongja-dong, Jangan District, Suwon, Gyeonggi Province	Hwang Young-mi (53) & Hwang Moon-moo (30): Grilled Duck; Kim Seok-shim (61): Gimbap, Jjolmyeon, Ramyeon; Jung Yoo-jung (48): Tteokbokki	
233	117	May 13, 2020	Alleys in Jeongja-dong, Jangan District, Suwon, Gyeonggi Province	Hwang Young-mi (53) & Hwang Moon-moo (30): Grilled Duck; Kim Seok-shim (61): Gimbap, Jjolmyeon, Ramyeon; Jung Yoo-jung (48): Tteokbokki	
234	118	May 20, 2020	Alleys in Jeongja-dong, Jangan District, Suwon, Gyeonggi Province	Hwang Young-mi (53) & Hwang Moon-moo (30): Grilled Duck; Kim Seok-shim (61): Gimbap, Jjolmyeon, Ramyeon; Jung Yoo-jung (48): Tteokbokki	Guest appearance by Yang Se-hyung.
235	119	May 27, 2020	Alleys in Jeongja-dong, Jangan District, Suwon, Gyeonggi Province	Hwang Young-mi (53) & Hwang Moon-moo (30): Grilled Duck; Kim Seok-shim (61): Gimbap, Jjolmyeon, Ramyeon; Jung Yoo-jung (48): Tteokbokki	Guest appearances by Yang Se-hyung, Kim Dong-jun.
236	120	June 3, 2020	Alleys in Jeongja-dong, Jangan District, Suwon, Gyeonggi Province	Hwang Young-mi (53) & Hwang Moon-moo (30): Grilled Duck; Kim Seok-shim (61): Gimbap, Jjolmyeon, Ramyeon; Jung Yoo-jung (48): Tteokbokki	Special appearance as customer by Byung-hyun Kim.
236	120	June 3, 2020		Kim Su-chul (60) & Kim Chun-ok (55): Gopchang, Jeongol; Lee Choong-gi (53): Pork Jjigae; Kim Jeong-nyo (62): Pile Bulgogi; Im Seung-jae: Hotteok; Lee Chang-hoon (27): Long Pizza; Kim Sung-man (38) & Park Min-young (35): Gimbap; Yoon Seong (32) & Kim Bo-mi (30): Curry; Jeong Sook-hee (41) & Jeong Eun-jeong (39): Jeon	Special Summer Emergency Inspection.
237	121	June 10, 2020		Kim Su-chul (60) & Kim Chun-ok (55): Gopchang, Jeongol; Lee Choong-gi (53): Pork Jjigae; Kim Jeong-nyo (62): Pile Bulgogi; Im Seung-jae: Hotteok; Lee Chang-hoon (27): Long Pizza; Kim Sung-man (38) & Park Min-young (35): Gimbap; Yoon Seong (32) & Kim Bo-mi (30): Curry; Jeong Sook-hee (41) & Jeong Eun-jeong (39): Jeon	Special Summer Emergency Inspection.
238	122	June 17, 2020		Kim Su-chul (60) & Kim Chun-ok (55): Gopchang, Jeongol; Lee Choong-gi (53): Pork Jjigae; Kim Jeong-nyo (62): Pile Bulgogi; Im Seung-jae: Hotteok; Lee Chang-hoon (27): Long Pizza; Kim Sung-man (38) & Park Min-young (35): Gimbap; Yoon Seong (32) & Kim Bo-mi (30): Curry; Jeong Sook-hee (41) & Jeong Eun-jeong (39): Jeon	Special Summer Emergency Inspection.
239	123	June 24, 2020		Kim Su-chul (60) & Kim Chun-ok (55): Gopchang, Jeongol; Lee Choong-gi (53): Pork Jjigae; Kim Jeong-nyo (62): Pile Bulgogi; Im Seung-jae: Hotteok; Lee Chang-hoon (27): Long Pizza; Kim Sung-man (38) & Park Min-young (35): Gimbap; Yoon Seong (32) & Kim Bo-mi (30): Curry; Jeong Sook-hee (41) & Jeong Eun-jeong (39): Jeon	Special Summer Emergency Inspection.
240	124	July 1, 2020		Kim Su-chul (60) & Kim Chun-ok (55): Gopchang, Jeongol; Lee Choong-gi (53): Pork Jjigae; Kim Jeong-nyo (62): Pile Bulgogi; Im Seung-jae: Hotteok; Lee Chang-hoon (27): Long Pizza; Kim Sung-man (38) & Park Min-young (35): Gimbap; Yoon Seong (32) & Kim Bo-mi (30): Curry; Jeong Sook-hee (41) & Jeong Eun-jeong (39): Jeon	Special Summer Emergency Inspection.
241	125	July 8, 2020	Dream Factory Road in Pohang, North Gyeongsang Province	Lee Young-mi (60): Seaweed Kal-guksu; Choi Min-ah (47): Tonkatsu, Coffee & Tea	
242	126	July 15, 2020	Dream Factory Road in Pohang, North Gyeongsang Province	Lee Young-mi (60): Seaweed Kal-guksu; Choi Min-ah (47): Tonkatsu, Coffee & Tea	
243	127	July 22, 2020	Dream Factory Road in Pohang, North Gyeongsang Province	Lee Young-mi (60): Seaweed Kal-guksu; Choi Min-ah (47): Tonkatsu, Coffee & Tea	
244	128	July 29, 2020	Dream Factory Road in Pohang, North Gyeongsang Province	Lee Young-mi (60): Seaweed Kal-guksu; Choi Min-ah (47): Tonkatsu, Coffee & Tea	Guest appearance by Kim Won-hyo.; Special appearances as customer by Shim Jin-hwa, Kim Won-hyo, Park Hyun-bin, Yoon Soo-hyun.
245	129	August 5, 2020	Alleys in Chang-dong, Dobong District, Seoul	Kim Yong-hyun (34): Pasta; Shin Young-min (33) & Jin Jong-ok (33): Sweet and Sour Chicken; Jung Tae-jin (51): Pizza	
246	130	August 12, 2020	Alleys in Chang-dong, Dobong District, Seoul	Kim Yong-hyun (34): Pasta; Shin Young-min (33) & Jin Jong-ok (33): Sweet and Sour Chicken; Jung Tae-jin (51): Pizza	
247	131	August 19, 2020	Alleys in Chang-dong, Dobong District, Seoul	Kim Yong-hyun (34): Pasta; Shin Young-min (33) & Jin Jong-ok (33): Sweet and Sour Chicken; Jung Tae-jin (51): Pizza	Special appearance as customer by Lee Seung-gi.
248	132	August 26, 2020	Alleys in Chang-dong, Dobong District, Seoul	Kim Yong-hyun (34): Pasta; Shin Young-min (33) & Jin Jong-ok (33): Sweet and Sour Chicken; Jung Tae-jin (51): Pizza	Special appearances as customer by Lee Seung-gi, Kyuhyun (Super Junior).
249	133	September 2, 2020	Alleys in Chang-dong, Dobong District, Seoul	Kim Yong-hyun (34): Pasta; Shin Young-min (33) & Jin Jong-ok (33): Sweet and Sour Chicken; Jung Tae-jin (51): Pizza	
250	134	September 9, 2020	Alley in front of Junggok Market, Junggok-dong, Gwangjin District, Seoul	Kang Hee-ja (69) & Jeong ji-sang (50): Mandu, Bibim-guksu, Janchi-guksu, Dak-bokkeum-tang; Park Byung-joo (33): Tonkatsu; Seong Ho-yeon (53): Eomuk, Tteokbokki	
251	135	September 16, 2020	Alley in front of Junggok Market, Junggok-dong, Gwangjin District, Seoul	Kang Hee-ja (69) & Jeong ji-sang (50): Mandu, Bibim-guksu, Janchi-guksu, Dak-bokkeum-tang; Park Byung-joo (33): Tonkatsu; Seong Ho-yeon (53): Eomuk, Tteokbokki	
252	136	September 23, 2020	Alley in front of Junggok Market, Junggok-dong, Gwangjin District, Seoul	Kang Hee-ja (69) & Jeong ji-sang (50): Mandu, Bibim-guksu, Janchi-guksu, Dak-bokkeum-tang; Park Byung-joo (33): Tonkatsu; Seong Ho-yeon (53): Eomuk, Tteokbokki	
253	137	September 30, 2020	Alley in front of Junggok Market, Junggok-dong, Gwangjin District, Seoul	Kang Hee-ja (69) & Jeong ji-sang (50): Mandu, Bibim-guksu, Janchi-guksu, Dak-bokkeum-tang; Park Byung-joo (33): Tonkatsu; Seong Ho-yeon (53): Eomuk, Tteokbokki	
254	138	October 7, 2020	Alley in front of Junggok Market, Junggok-dong, Gwangjin District, Seoul	Kang Hee-ja (69) & Jeong ji-sang (50): Mandu, Bibim-guksu, Janchi-guksu, Dak-bokkeum-tang; Park Byung-joo (33): Tonkatsu; Seong Ho-yeon (53): Eomuk, Tteokbokki	
255	139	October 14, 2020	Alleys in Sangdo-dong, Dongjak District, Seoul	Park Gi-cheol (49) & Jang Eun-joo (44): Spam musubi; Kim Bok-ja (55): Janchi-guksu; Kim Eun-hee (64): Chicken Tteokbokki	
256	140	October 21, 2020	Alleys in Sangdo-dong, Dongjak District, Seoul	Park Gi-cheol (49) & Jang Eun-joo (44): Spam musubi; Kim Bok-ja (55): Janchi-guksu; Kim Eun-hee (64): Chicken Tteokbokki	
257	141	October 28, 2020	Alleys in Sangdo-dong, Dongjak District, Seoul	Park Gi-cheol (49) & Jang Eun-joo (44): Spam musubi; Kim Bok-ja (55): Janchi-guksu; Kim Eun-hee (64): Chicken Tteokbokki	
258	142	November 4, 2020	Alleys in Sangdo-dong, Dongjak District, Seoul	Park Gi-cheol (49) & Jang Eun-joo (44): Spam musubi; Kim Bok-ja (55): Janchi-guksu; Kim Eun-hee (64): Chicken Tteokbokki	Special appearance as customer by Hur Jae.
259	143	November 11, 2020	Alleys in Sangdo-dong, Dongjak District, Seoul	Park Gi-cheol (49) & Jang Eun-joo (44): Spam musubi; Kim Bok-ja (55): Janchi-guksu; Kim Eun-hee (64): Chicken Tteokbokki	Special appearance as customer by Kwak Si-yang.
260	144	November 18, 2020	Sagajeong Market in Myeonmok-dong, Jungnang District, Seoul	Park Ki-young (33) & Kang Seong-man (31) & Kim Se-jung (27): Kimchi-jjigae; Hyun Soon-hee (69): Agwi-jjim; Yoon Hye-jeong (53) & Pyo Ki-suk (51): Whole Chicken Stew	
261	145	November 25, 2020	Sagajeong Market in Myeonmok-dong, Jungnang District, Seoul	Park Ki-young (33) & Kang Seong-man (31) & Kim Se-jung (27): Kimchi-jjigae; Hyun Soon-hee (69): Agwi-jjim; Yoon Hye-jeong (53) & Pyo Ki-suk (51): Whole Chicken Stew	
262	146	December 2, 2020	Sagajeong Market in Myeonmok-dong, Jungnang District, Seoul	Park Ki-young (33) & Kang Seong-man (31) & Kim Se-jung (27): Kimchi-jjigae; Hyun Soon-hee (69): Agwi-jjim; Yoon Hye-jeong (53) & Pyo Ki-suk (51): Whole Chicken Stew	Special appearances as customer by Kang Jae-joon, Lee Eun-hyung.
263	147	December 9, 2020	Sagajeong Market in Myeonmok-dong, Jungnang District, Seoul	Park Ki-young (33) & Kang Seong-man (31) & Kim Se-jung (27): Kimchi-jjigae; Hyun Soon-hee (69): Agwi-jjim; Yoon Hye-jeong (53) & Pyo Ki-suk (51): Whole Chicken Stew	Special appearance as customer by Ha Seok-jin.
264	148	December 16, 2020		Choi Min-ah: Deopjuk; Park Yoo-deok: Makgeolli with side dishes; Sim Hyun-jeong: Guksu, Gimbap; Jin Seung-ja: Tteokbokki; Jeon Hui-ja & Lee Mi-ran: Jjigae; Kim Il-joong & Lee Jong-hoon & Joo Kyung-won: Hamburg steak	Special Winter Emergency Inspection.
265	149	December 23, 2020		Choi Min-ah: Deopjuk; Park Yoo-deok: Makgeolli with side dishes; Sim Hyun-jeong: Guksu, Gimbap; Jin Seung-ja: Tteokbokki; Jeon Hui-ja & Lee Mi-ran: Jjigae; Kim Il-joong & Lee Jong-hoon & Joo Kyung-won: Hamburg steak	Special Winter Emergency Inspection.
266	150	December 30, 2020		Choi Min-ah: Deopjuk; Park Yoo-deok: Makgeolli with side dishes; Sim Hyun-jeong: Guksu, Gimbap; Jin Seung-ja: Tteokbokki; Jeon Hui-ja & Lee Mi-ran: Jjigae; Kim Il-joong & Lee Jong-hoon & Joo Kyung-won: Hamburg steak	Special Winter Emergency Inspection.

=== 2021 ===
List of episodes in 2021 (episode 151–200)

#	Episode #	Broadcast Date	Alley(s) Position	Restaurant owner/chef and main dish(es)	Remark
267	151	January 6, 2021		Jin Seung-ja: Tteokbokki; Kim Pan-soo & Hwang Eun-ji: Taco, Burrito, Quesadilla; Won Sang-gi: Kal-guksu, Patjuk	Special Winter Emergency Inspection.
268	152	January 13, 2021	Moran Station back alley in Sujeong District, Seongnam, Gyeonggi Province	Na Yeong-ae (65): Janchi-guksu & Bibim-guksu; Yun Jeong-suk (48): Yukgaejang; Shin Eun-joo (45): Kimchi Jjim Stew	
269	153	January 20, 2021	Moran Station back alley in Sujeong District, Seongnam, Gyeonggi Province	Na Yeong-ae (65): Janchi-guksu & Bibim-guksu; Yun Jeong-suk (48): Yukgaejang; Shin Eun-joo (45): Kimchi Jjim Stew	
270	154	January 27, 2021	Moran Station back alley in Sujeong District, Seongnam, Gyeonggi Province	Na Yeong-ae (65): Janchi-guksu & Bibim-guksu; Yun Jeong-suk (48): Yukgaejang; Shin Eun-joo (45): Kimchi Jjim Stew	Special appearance as food agent by Oh Na-ra.
271	155	February 3, 2021	Moran Station back alley in Sujeong District, Seongnam, Gyeonggi Province	Na Yeong-ae (65): Janchi-guksu & Bibim-guksu; Yun Jeong-suk (48): Yukgaejang; Shin Eun-joo (45): Kimchi Jjim Stew	Special appearance as food agents by Monsta X (Shownu and Joohoney)
272	156	February 10, 2021	Alleys in Deungchon-dong, Gangseo District, Seoul	Ji Hwa-ja (43): Chueo-tang; Bae Kwang-yoon (43): Pho; Na Young-soo (39): Hoe-deopbap (Shrimp & Salmon)	
273	157	February 17, 2021	Alleys in Deungchon-dong, Gangseo District, Seoul	Ji Hwa-ja (43): Chueo-tang; Bae Kwang-yoon (43): Pho; Na Young-soo (39): Hoe-deopbap (Shrimp & Salmon)	
274	158	February 24, 2021	Alleys in Deungchon-dong, Gangseo District, Seoul	Ji Hwa-ja (43): Chueo-tang; Bae Kwang-yoon (43): Pho; Na Young-soo (39): Hoe-deopbap (Shrimp & Salmon)	
275	159	March 3, 2021	Alleys in Deungchon-dong, Gangseo District, Seoul	Ji Hwa-ja (43): Chueo-tang; Bae Kwang-yoon (43): Pho; Na Young-soo (39): Hoe-deopbap (Shrimp & Salmon)	Special appearance as food agent by Lee Sun-bin.
276	160	March 10, 2021	Alleys in Deungchon-dong, Gangseo District, Seoul	Ji Hwa-ja (43): Chueo-tang; Bae Kwang-yoon (43): Pho; Na Young-soo (39): Hoe-deopbap (Shrimp & Salmon)	Special appearance as food agents by Yoon Ji-sung and Kim Jae-hwan.
277	161	March 17, 2021	Alley at Gildong Station in Gil-dong, Gangdong District, Seoul	Chae Ho-sung (51): Dak-galbi; Hong Tae-hoon (44): Pasta & Pizza; Moon Jae-sung (48): Young Pollack Jjim	
278	162	March 24, 2021	Alley at Gildong Station in Gil-dong, Gangdong District, Seoul	Chae Ho-sung (51): Dak-galbi; Hong Tae-hoon (44): Pasta & Pizza; Moon Jae-sung (48): Young Pollack Jjim	
279	163	March 31, 2021	Alley at Gildong Station in Gil-dong, Gangdong District, Seoul	Chae Ho-sung (51): Dak-galbi; Hong Tae-hoon (44): Pasta & Pizza; Moon Jae-sung (48): Young Pollack Jjim	Special appearance as food agent by Sunmi.
280	164	April 7, 2021	Alley at Gildong Station in Gil-dong, Gangdong District, Seoul	Chae Ho-sung (51): Dak-galbi; Hong Tae-hoon (44): Pasta & Pizza; Moon Jae-sung (48): Young Pollack Jjim	Special appearance as food agents by Kim Kang-hyun and Dong Hyun Kim
281	165	April 14, 2021	Alley at Oryu-dong, Guro District, Seoul	Lee Byung-gyu (37): Budae-jjigae; Lee Hae-bok (46): Gamja-ongsimi; Moon Chan-sook (56): Tongdak	
282	166	April 21, 2021	Alley at Oryu-dong, Guro District, Seoul	Lee Byung-gyu (37): Budae-jjigae; Lee Hae-bok (46): Gamja-ongsimi; Moon Chan-sook (56): Tongdak	
283	167	April 28, 2021	Alley at Oryu-dong, Guro District, Seoul	Lee Byung-gyu (37): Budae-jjigae; Lee Hae-bok (46): Gamja-ongsimi; Moon Chan-sook (56): Tongdak	Special appearance as food agents by Kim Se-jeong (Gugudan) and ITZY.
284	168	May 5, 2021	Alley at Oryu-dong, Guro District, Seoul	Lee Byung-gyu (37): Budae-jjigae; Lee Hae-bok (46): Gamja-ongsimi; Moon Chan-sook (56): Tongdak	Special appearance as food agent by Kim Se-jeong (Gugudan).; Co-host Jung In-sun's last episode.
285	169	May 12, 2021	Car Repair Shop Alley at Sang-dong, Bucheon, Gyeonggi Province	Lee Jong-min (34) & Jo Su-min (24): Sandwich; Moon Kyu-sik (38): Hamburger; Kim Dae-ho: A half and half Tonkatsu	Keum Sae-rok joined as co-host.
286	170	May 19, 2021	Car Repair Shop Alley at Sang-dong, Bucheon, Gyeonggi Province	Lee Jong-min (34) & Jo Su-min (24): Sandwich; Moon Kyu-sik (38): Hamburger; Kim Dae-ho: A half and half Tonkatsu	
287	171	May 26, 2021	Car Repair Shop Alley at Sang-dong, Bucheon, Gyeonggi Province	Lee Jong-min (34) & Jo Su-min (24): Sandwich; Moon Kyu-sik (38): Hamburger; Kim Dae-ho: A half and half Tonkatsu	
288	172	June 2, 2021	Car Repair Shop Alley at Sang-dong, Bucheon, Gyeonggi Province	Lee Jong-min (34) & Jo Su-min (24): Sandwich; Moon Kyu-sik (38): Hamburger; Kim Dae-ho: A half and half Tonkatsu	Special appearance as food agent by Kwak Dong-yeon.
289	173	June 9, 2021	Car Repair Shop Alley at Sang-dong, Bucheon, Gyeonggi Province	Lee Jong-min (34) & Jo Su-min (24): Sandwich; Moon Kyu-sik (38): Hamburger; Kim Dae-ho: A half and half Tonkatsu	
290	174	June 16, 2021	Ilsan Forest Village Alley at Goyang, Gyeonggi Province	Eom Seo-yun (56) & Kim Eun-seon (35): Agwi-jjim; Park Jae-young (34) & Jung Ji-ae (36): Pasta; Bang Byeong-hak (47) & Park Eun-sil (47): Pho	
291	175	June 23, 2021	Ilsan Forest Village Alley at Goyang, Gyeonggi Province	Eom Seo-yun (56) & Kim Eun-seon (35): Agwi-jjim; Park Jae-young (34) & Jung Ji-ae (36): Pasta; Bang Byeong-hak (47) & Park Eun-sil (47): Pho	Special appearance as tasters by Seventeen (Mingyu, Vernon, The8, Hoshi).
292	176	June 30, 2021	Ilsan Forest Village Alley at Goyang, Gyeonggi Province	Eom Seo-yun (56) & Kim Eun-seon (35): Agwi-jjim; Park Jae-young (34) & Jung Ji-ae (36): Pasta; Bang Byeong-hak (47) & Park Eun-sil (47): Pho	Special appearance as tasters by Seventeen (Mingyu, Vernon, The8, Hoshi).; Special appearance as food agents by Lee Jong-hyuk and Lee Joon-soo.
293	177	July 7, 2021	Ilsan Forest Village Alley at Goyang, Gyeonggi Province	Eom Seo-yun (56) & Kim Eun-seon (35): Agwi-jjim; Park Jae-young (34) & Jung Ji-ae (36): Pasta; Bang Byeong-hak (47) & Park Eun-sil (47): Pho	Special appearance as food agents by Girls' Generation (Yuri and Hyoyeon).
294	178	July 14, 2021	Seokbadae Alley at Hanam, Gyeonggi Province	Shin Kyung-mi (54) & Kwak Min-cheol (31): Dak-galbi; Choi Geum-soon (62) & Gil Sea-bom (28): Bunsik; Mun Ji-sun (45) & Han Kyung-ah (42): Gogi-guksu	
295	179	July 21, 2021	Seokbadae Alley at Hanam, Gyeonggi Province	Shin Kyung-mi (54) & Kwak Min-cheol (31): Dak-galbi; Choi Geum-soon (62) & Gil Sea-bom (28): Bunsik; Mun Ji-sun (45) & Han Kyung-ah (42): Gogi-guksu	
296	180	July 28, 2021	Seokbadae Alley at Hanam, Gyeonggi Province	Shin Kyung-mi (54) & Kwak Min-cheol (31): Dak-galbi; Choi Geum-soon (62) & Gil Sea-bom (28): Bunsik; Mun Ji-sun (45) & Han Kyung-ah (42): Gogi-guksu	
297	181	August 4, 2021	Seokbadae Alley at Hanam, Gyeonggi Province	Shin Kyung-mi (54) & Kwak Min-cheol (31): Dak-galbi; Choi Geum-soon (62) & Gil Sea-bom (28): Bunsik; Mun Ji-sun (45) & Han Kyung-ah (42): Gogi-guksu	Special appearance as food agents by WJSN (Luda, Dawon, Soobin and Yeoreum), The Jadu.
298	182	August 11, 2021	Seokbadae Alley at Hanam, Gyeonggi Province	Shin Kyung-mi (54) & Kwak Min-cheol (31): Dak-galbi; Choi Geum-soon (62) & Gil Sea-bom (28): Bunsik; Mun Ji-sun (45) & Han Kyung-ah (42): Gogi-guksu	Special appearance as food agents by Noh Sa-yeon and Noh Sa-bong.
299	183	August 18, 2021	Jeju Project Geumak Village at Hallim-eup, Jeju Province	Choi Jae-moon (33) & Choi Myung-geun (37); Ryu Ik-ha (31); Kim Jong-wook (33); Song Ju-young (39); Cho A-reum (30); Kim Tae Hwan (33); Choi Doo-hwan (39) & Lee Seul-bin (33); Lee Ji-hoon (31)	
300	184	August 25, 2021	Jeju Project Geumak Village at Hallim-eup, Jeju Province	Choi Jae-moon (33) & Choi Myung-geun (37); Ryu Ik-ha (31); Kim Jong-wook (33); Song Ju-young (39); Cho A-reum (30); Kim Tae Hwan (33); Choi Doo-hwan (39) & Lee Seul-bin (33); Lee Ji-hoon (31)	
301	185	September 1, 2021	Jeju Project Geumak Village at Hallim-eup, Jeju Province	Choi Jae-moon (33) & Choi Myung-geun (37); Ryu Ik-ha (31); Kim Jong-wook (33); Song Ju-young (39); Cho A-reum (30); Kim Tae Hwan (33); Choi Doo-hwan (39) & Lee Seul-bin (33); Lee Ji-hoon (31)	
302	186	September 8, 2021	Jeju Project Geumak Village at Hallim-eup, Jeju Province	Choi Jae-moon (33) & Choi Myung-geun (37); Ryu Ik-ha (31); Kim Jong-wook (33); Song Ju-young (39); Cho A-reum (30); Kim Tae Hwan (33); Choi Doo-hwan (39) & Lee Seul-bin (33); Lee Ji-hoon (31)	Ryu Ik-ha leave the show.
303	187	September 15, 2021	Jeju Project Geumak Village at Hallim-eup, Jeju Province	Choi Jae-moon (33) & Choi Myung-geun (37); Ryu Ik-ha (31); Kim Jong-wook (33); Song Ju-young (39); Cho A-reum (30); Kim Tae Hwan (33); Choi Doo-hwan (39) & Lee Seul-bin (33); Lee Ji-hoon (31)	
304	188	September 29, 2021	Jeju Project Geumak Village at Hallim-eup, Jeju Province	Choi Jae-moon (33) & Choi Myung-geun (37); Ryu Ik-ha (31); Kim Jong-wook (33); Song Ju-young (39); Cho A-reum (30); Kim Tae Hwan (33); Choi Doo-hwan (39) & Lee Seul-bin (33); Lee Ji-hoon (31)	
305	189	October 6, 2021	Jeju Project Geumak Village at Hallim-eup, Jeju Province	Choi Jae-moon (33) & Choi Myung-geun (37); Ryu Ik-ha (31); Kim Jong-wook (33); Song Ju-young (39); Cho A-reum (30); Kim Tae Hwan (33); Choi Doo-hwan (39) & Lee Seul-bin (33); Lee Ji-hoon (31)	
306	190	October 13, 2021	Sincheolwon Alley at Cheorwon County, Gangwon Province	Choi Won-woo (43) & Lee Ji-young (35): Shabu-shabu; Lee Eun-hae (43): Soybean sprouts Gukbap; Lee Bok-soon (42): Jeonggol Kal-guksu	
307	191	October 20, 2021	Sincheolwon Alley at Cheorwon County, Gangwon Province	Choi Won-woo (43) & Lee Ji-young (35): Shabu-shabu; Lee Eun-hae (43): Soybean sprouts Gukbap; Lee Bok-soon (42): Jeonggol Kal-guksu	
308	192	October 27, 2021	Sincheolwon Alley at Cheorwon County, Gangwon Province	Choi Won-woo (43) & Lee Ji-young (35): Shabu-shabu; Lee Eun-hae (43): Soybean sprouts Gukbap; Lee Bok-soon (42): Jeonggol Kal-guksu	
309	193	November 3, 2021	Sincheolwon Alley at Cheorwon County, Gangwon Province	Choi Won-woo (43) & Lee Ji-young (35): Shabu-shabu; Lee Eun-hae (43): Soybean sprouts Gukbap; Lee Bok-soon (42): Jeonggol Kal-guksu	Special appearance as food agents by Jeon Somi and Vince.
310	194	November 10, 2021	Sincheolwon Alley at Cheorwon County, Gangwon Province	Choi Won-woo (43) & Lee Ji-young (35): Shabu-shabu; Lee Eun-hae (43): Soybean sprouts Gukbap; Lee Bok-soon (42): Jeonggol Kal-guksu	Special appearance as food agents by DinDin and Burr9.
310	194	November 10, 2021	Alley front at Korea University, Seongbuk District, Seoul	Seok Eun-yeol (53): Cheese Hot Pot Rice; Kim Hyung-seung (48) & Cho Hye-rim (41): Half Chicken and Half Fried Rice; Seok Hun (57) & Kim Jin-hee (50): Tomato Stir-fried Pork Rice Bowl	Last Alley
311	195	November 24, 2021	Alley front at Korea University, Seongbuk District, Seoul	Seok Eun-yeol (53): Cheese Hot Pot Rice; Kim Hyung-seung (48) & Cho Hye-rim (41): Half Chicken and Half Fried Rice; Seok Hun (57) & Kim Jin-hee (50): Tomato Stir-fried Pork Rice Bowl	
312	196	December 1, 2021	Alley front at Korea University, Seongbuk District, Seoul	Seok Eun-yeol (53): Cheese Hot Pot Rice; Kim Hyung-seung (48) & Cho Hye-rim (41): Half Chicken and Half Fried Rice; Seok Hun (57) & Kim Jin-hee (50): Tomato Stir-fried Pork Rice Bowl	
313	197	December 8, 2021	Alley front at Korea University, Seongbuk District, Seoul	Seok Eun-yeol (53): Cheese Hot Pot Rice; Kim Hyung-seung (48) & Cho Hye-rim (41): Half Chicken and Half Fried Rice; Seok Hun (57) & Kim Jin-hee (50): Tomato Stir-fried Pork Rice Bowl	Special appearance as food agents by Jung Sung-ho.
314	198	December 15, 2021	Alley front at Korea University, Seongbuk District, Seoul	Seok Eun-yeol (53): Cheese Hot Pot Rice; Kim Hyung-seung (48) & Cho Hye-rim (41): Half Chicken and Half Fried Rice; Seok Hun (57) & Kim Jin-hee (50): Tomato Stir-fried Pork Rice Bowl	Special appearance as food agents by IVE (An Yu-jin, Jang Won-young and Liz), Lee Young-ji
315	199	December 22, 2021			Special Final Inspection; Last Broadcast
316	200	December 29, 2021			Special Final Inspection; Last Broadcast

== Ratings ==
In the table below, the blue numbers represent the lowest ratings and the red numbers represent the highest ratings.

=== 2018 ===
List of ratings in 2018 (Episodes 1 – 46)

#	Episode #	Broadcast Date	TNmS Ratings		AGB Ratings	
#	Episode #	Broadcast Date	Part 1	Part 2	Part 1	Part 2
117	1	January 5, 2018	3.9%	5.0%	4.3%	5.6%
118	2	January 12, 2018	4.5%	5.6%	4.3%	5.7%
119	3	January 19, 2018	4.7%	5.8%	5.1%	6.3%
120	4	January 26, 2018	4.4%	4.3%	5.6%	5.4%
121	5	February 2, 2018	4.5%	4.7%	4.6%	4.8%
122	6	February 16, 2018	3.8%	4.3%	3.9%	4.9%
123	7	February 23, 2018	4.6%	5.7%	4.4%	6.0%
124	8	March 2, 2018	4.5%	5.0%	5.1%	5.4%
125	9	March 9, 2018	4.6%	6.9%	5.1%	7.6%
126	10	March 16, 2018	4.9%	6.1%	6.1%	7.5%
127	11	March 23, 2018	4.5%	5.1%	5.0%	5.0%
128	12	March 30, 2018	4.3%	5.3%	5.2%	5.0%
129	13	April 6, 2018	4.9%	4.9%	5.0%	4.7%
130	14	April 13, 2018	4.6%	5.3%	5.0%	5.0%
131	15	April 20, 2018	3.9%	4.3%	4.6%	4.9%
132	16	May 4, 2018	3.5%	4.2%	4.2%	4.4%
133	17	May 11, 2018	4.4%	5.1%	4.4%	5.0%
134	18	May 18, 2018	4.1%	4.7%	4.9%	5.7%
135	19	May 25, 2018	3.5%	4.1%	4.1%	5.0%
136	20	June 1, 2018	—	—	4.4%	5.1%
137	21	June 8, 2018	—	—	4.6%	5.7%
138	22	June 15, 2018	—	—	4.3%	5.2%
139	23	June 29, 2018	—	—	4.7%	5.8%
140	24	July 13, 2018	—	—	4.2%	4.4%
141	25	July 20, 2018	—	—	4.7%	4.8%
142	26	July 27, 2018	—	—	4.7%	6.1%
143	27	August 3, 2018	—	4.9%	3.7%	4.5%
144	28	August 10, 2018	—	—	4.8%	5.4%
145	29	August 17, 2018	—	—	4.7%	5.3%
146	30	August 29, 2018	—	—	4.8%	5.5%
147	31	September 5, 2018	—	—	4.8%	5.3%
148	32	September 12, 2018	—	—	4.8%	5.7%
149	33	September 26, 2018	—	—	4.5%	5.1%
150	34	October 3, 2018	—	—	4.8%	5.7%
151	35	October 10, 2018	—	—	4.7%	6.2%
152	36	October 17, 2018	—	—	4.7%	5.5%
153	37	October 24, 2018	—	—	5.6%	6.1%
154	38	October 31, 2018	—	—	5.5%	5.3%
155	39	November 7, 2018	—	—	5.8%	6.5%
156	40	November 14, 2018	5.8%	6.0%	6.9%	7.8%
157	41	November 21, 2018	6.3%	6.7%	5.8%	7.0%
158	42	November 28, 2018	7.3%	7.2%	7.8%	8.3%
159	43	December 5, 2018	7.5%	7.9%	7.6%	8.6%
160	44	December 12, 2018	7.6%	7.9%	8.1%	8.6%
161	45	December 19, 2018	6.4%	7.5%	7.8%	8.1%
162	46	December 26, 2018	7.6%	8.1%	8.5%	9.4%

=== 2019 ===
List of ratings in 2019 (Episodes 47 – 98)

#	Episode #	Broadcast Date	TNmS Ratings		AGB Ratings	
#	Episode #	Broadcast Date	Part 1	Part 2	Part 1	Part 2
163	47	January 2, 2019	9.7%	12.3%	9.0%	9.5%
164	48	January 9, 2019	9.8%	10.7%	10.2%	10.4%
165	49	January 16, 2019	7.5%	7.9%	8.0%	8.6%
166	50	January 23, 2019	7.0%	7.6%	8.2%	9.5%
167	51	January 30, 2019	7.7%	8.0%	9.7%	10.0%
168	52	February 6, 2019	7.8%	7.9%	9.0%	9.5%
169	53	February 13, 2019	7.1%	7.5%	7.8%	8.5%
170	54	February 20, 2019	7.1%	7.6%	7.9%	10.0%
171	55	February 27, 2019	5.8%	6.8%	6.3%	8.0%
172	56	March 6, 2019	6.4%	7.1%	6.4%	7.1%
173	57	March 13, 2019	—	—	6.5%	7.5%
174	58	March 20, 2019	—	—	6.9%	7.5%
175	59	March 27, 2019	4.5%	5.4%	6.3%	7.0%
176	60	April 3, 2019	—	—	5.4%	6.7%
177	61	April 10, 2019	—	—	6.1%	7.8%
178	62	April 17, 2019	—	—	5.9%	6.5%
179	63	April 24, 2019	—	—	6.3%	7.5%
180	64	May 1, 2019	—	—	6.2%	7.1%
181	65	May 8, 2019	—	—	6.2%	6.8%
182	66	May 15, 2019	—	—	6.6%	6.8%
183	67	May 22, 2019	—	—	5.3%	6.6%
184	68	May 29, 2019	—	—	5.9%	7.0%
185	69	June 5, 2019	—	—	6.9%	8.3%
186	70	June 12, 2019	—	—	5.3%	6.6%
187	71	June 19, 2019	—	—	5.6%	6.9%
188	72	June 26, 2019	—	—	5.3%	6.6%
189	73	July 3, 2019	—	—	6.1%	6.6%
190	74	July 10, 2019	—	—	5.7%	5.8%
191	75	July 17, 2019	—	—	5.9%	6.3%
192	76	July 24, 2019	—	—	6.5%	9.0%
193	77	July 31, 2019	—	—	6.1%	7.2%
194	78	August 7, 2019	—	—	7.4%	9.2%
195	79	August 14, 2019	—	—	5.1%	6.9%
196	80	August 21, 2019	—	—	5.8%	6.6%
197	81	August 28, 2019	—	—	4.8%	5.9%
198	82	September 4, 2019	—	—	5.1%	5.4%
199	83	September 11, 2019	—	—	5.5%	6.8%
200	84	September 18, 2019	—	—	5.0%	5.4%
201	85	September 25, 2019	—	—	4.6%	5.6%
202	86	October 2, 2019	—	—	4.7%	6.3%
203	87	October 9, 2019	—	—	4.9%	5.4%
204	88	October 16, 2019	—	—	4.4%	5.0%
205	89	October 23, 2019	—	—	5.3%	6.1%
206	90	October 30, 2019	—	—	5.2%	5.2%
207	91	November 6, 2019	—	—	4.9%	5.3%
208	92	November 13, 2019	—	—	5.7%	5.7%
209	93	November 20, 2019	—	—	5.6%	5.9%
210	94	November 27, 2019	—	—	5.2%	6.4%
211	95	December 4, 2019	—	—	5.9%	6.6%
212	96	December 11, 2019	—	—	6.3%	6.4%
213	97	December 18, 2019	—	—	7.3%	9.1%
214	98	December 25, 2019	—	—	8.4%	10.5%

=== 2020 ===
List of ratings in 2020 (Episodes 99 – 150)

#	Episode #	Broadcast Date	AGB Ratings (Nationwide)	
#	Episode #	Broadcast Date	Part 1	Part 2
215	99	January 1, 2020	9.4%	11.9%
216	100	January 8, 2020	8.7%	9.9%
217	101	January 15, 2020	6.6%	7.2%
218	102	January 22, 2020	6.9%	7.6%
219	103	January 29, 2020	5.6%	7.5%
220	104	February 5, 2020	5.8%	6.8%
221	105	February 12, 2020	6.5%	8.1%
222	106	February 19, 2020	6.9%	7.2%
223	107	February 26, 2020	6.4%	7.5%
224	108	March 4, 2020	7.1%	8.2%
225	109	March 11, 2020	7.3%	9.0%
226	110	March 18, 2020	9.7%	10.8%
227	111	March 25, 2020	7.3%	7.5%
228	112	April 1, 2020	7.3%	8.2%
229	113	April 8, 2020	6.8%	6.9%
230	114	April 22, 2020	7.0%	7.5%
231	115	April 29, 2020	6.2%	6.5%
232	116	May 6, 2020	6.2%	6.6%
233	117	May 13, 2020	5.2%	5.8%
234	118	May 20, 2020	4.7%	4.9%
235	119	May 27, 2020	4.2%	4.2%
236	120	June 3, 2020	4.5%	5.8%
237	121	June 10, 2020	5.8%	6.5%
238	122	June 17, 2020	5.8%	7.3%
239	123	June 24, 2020	5.2%	5.7%
240	124	July 1, 2020	4.6%	5.7%
241	125	July 8, 2020	3.6%	5.5%
242	126	July 15, 2020	4.7%	6.1%
243	127	July 22, 2020	3.8%	4.6%
244	128	July 29, 2020	4.2%	5.3%
245	129	August 5, 2020	3.7%	4.8%
246	130	August 12, 2020	4.0%	5.0%
247	131	August 19, 2020	4.7%	5.6%
248	132	August 26, 2020	5.0%	5.6%
249	133	September 2, 2020	4.8%	5.0%
250	134	September 9, 2020	5.6%	5.3%
251	135	September 16, 2020	4.3%	4.0%
252	136	September 23, 2020	4.8%	4.7%
253	137	September 30, 2020	2.9%	3.6%
254	138	October 7, 2020	4.6%	4.2%
255	139	October 14, 2020	4.6%	4.8%
256	140	October 21, 2020	—	5.2%
257	141	October 28, 2020	4.7%	4.2%
258	142	November 4, 2020	4.8%	4.7%
259	143	November 11, 2020	4.8%	5.5%
260	144	November 18, 2020	6.4%	6.7%
261	145	November 25, 2020	4.4%	4.7%
262	146	December 2, 2020	4.4%	5.2%
263	147	December 9, 2020	4.7%	4.9%
264	148	December 16, 2020	5.1%	5.6%
265	149	December 23, 2020	4.9%	6.5%
266	150	December 30, 2020	6.7%	7.1%

=== 2021 ===
List of ratings in 2021 (Episodes 151 – 200)

#	Episode #	Broadcast Date	AGB Ratings (Nationwide)	
#	Episode #	Broadcast Date	Part 1	Part 2
267	151	January 6, 2021	4.4%	4.9%
268	152	January 13, 2021	4.6%	5.9%
269	153	January 20, 2021	4.4%	5.6%
270	154	January 27, 2021	4.3%	5.1%
271	155	February 3, 2021	4.6%	5.4%
272	156	February 10, 2021	4.7%	6.0%
273	157	February 17, 2021	5.1%	6.3%
274	158	February 24, 2021	4.4%	5.0%
275	159	March 3, 2021	4.2%	4.5%
276	160	March 10, 2021	3.7%	4.4%
277	161	March 17, 2021	3.8%	4.6%
278	162	March 24, 2021	3.7%	4.0%
279	163	March 31, 2021	3.1%	3.1%
280	164	April 7, 2021	3.4%	4.2%
281	165	April 14, 2021	3.8%	4.5%
282	166	April 21, 2021	3.9%	4.3%
283	167	April 28, 2021	3.9%	3.9%
284	168	May 5, 2021	4.2%	4.2%
285	169	May 12, 2021	3.8%	3.7%
286	170	May 19, 2021	4.1%	4.1%
287	171	May 26, 2021	3.8%	3.7%
288	172	June 2, 2021	4.7%	4.1%
289	173	June 9, 2021	4.3%	3.9%
290	174	June 16, 2021	4.3%	5.2%
291	175	June 23, 2021	3.6%	4.6%
292	176	June 30, 2021	3.6%	5.0%
293	177	July 7, 2021	3.7%	
294	178	July 14, 2021	3.7%	
295	179	July 21, 2021	4.1%	
296	180	July 28, 2021	4.8%	
297	181	August 4, 2021	3.0%	
298	182	August 11, 2021	4.1%	
299	183	August 18, 2021	4.1%	
300	184	August 25, 2021	4.1%	
301	185	September 1, 2021	3.1%	
302	186	September 8, 2021	3.6%	
303	187	September 15, 2021	3.3%	
304	188	September 29, 2021	3.1%	
305	189	October 6, 2021	2.8%	
306	190	October 13, 2021	4.1%	
307	191	October 20, 2021	3.5%	
308	192	October 27, 2021	3.9%	
309	193	November 3, 2021	3.7%	
310	194	November 10, 2021	3.4%	
311	195	November 24, 2021	3.2%	
312	196	December 1, 2021	2.8%	
313	197	December 8, 2021	2.9%	
314	198	December 15, 2021	2.3%	
315	199	December 22, 2021	3.5%	
316	200	December 29, 2021	3.3%	

== Cancellation of broadcasting ==
Date	Scheduled episode	Reason	Notes/References
February 9, 2018	6	2018 Winter Olympics	Main broadcast and delaying of other programs
April 27, 2018	16	April 2018 inter-Korean summit	Broadcast of the special news
June 22, 2018	23	South Korea vs Mexico (2018 FIFA World Cup Group F)	The pre-match commentary program
July 6, 2018	24	Uruguay vs France (2018 FIFA World Cup quarter-final)	Broadcast of the match
September 19, 2018	33	September 2018 inter-Korean summit	
April 15, 2020	114	2020 South Korean legislative election	Election broadcasting
September 22, 2021	188	Chuseok special broadcast	Airing of film The Book of Fish
November 17, 2021	195	Broadcast demonstration	Hogu's Secret Tutoring

== Awards and nominations ==
Name of the award ceremony, year presented, category, nominee of the award, and the result of the nomination
Award ceremony	Year	Category	Nominee / work	Result	Ref.
Baeksang Arts Awards	2019	Best Entertainment Program	Paik Jong-won's Alley Restaurant	Nominated	
Korea First Brand Awards	2021	Best Cooking Program	Paik Jong-won's Alley Restaurant	Won	
SBS Entertainment Awards	2018	Excellence Award in Variety Category	Jo Bo-ah	Won	
SBS Entertainment Awards	2018	Rookie Award in Female Category	Jo Bo-ah	Nominated	
SBS Entertainment Awards	2018	Best MC Award	Kim Sung-joo	Won	
SBS Entertainment Awards	2019	Grand Prize (Daesang)	Paik Jong-won	Nominated	
SBS Entertainment Awards	2019	Top Excellence Programme in Reality Category	Paik Jong-won's Alley Restaurant	Won	
SBS Entertainment Awards	2019	Top Excellence Award in Show/Variety Category	Kim Sung-joo	Won	
SBS Entertainment Awards	2019	Rookie Award in Female Category	Jung In-sun	Won	
SBS Entertainment Awards	2019	Lifetime Achievement Award	Paik Jong-won	Won	
SBS Entertainment Awards	2020	Grand Prize (Daesang)	Paik Jong-won	Nominated	
SBS Entertainment Awards	2020	Scriptwriter of the Year	Hwang Bo-kyung	Won	
SBS Entertainment Awards	2020	Special Awards: Public Interest Variety Award	Kim Sung-joo	Won	
SBS Entertainment Awards	2020	Excellence Award in Reality Category	Jung In-sun	Won	
SBS Entertainment Awards	2021	Rookie Award in Variety	Keum Sae-rok	Won	
SBS Entertainment Awards	2021	Special Award	Paik Jong-won's Alley Restaurant	Won	
