= Kuksi =

Russo-Korean noodle dish

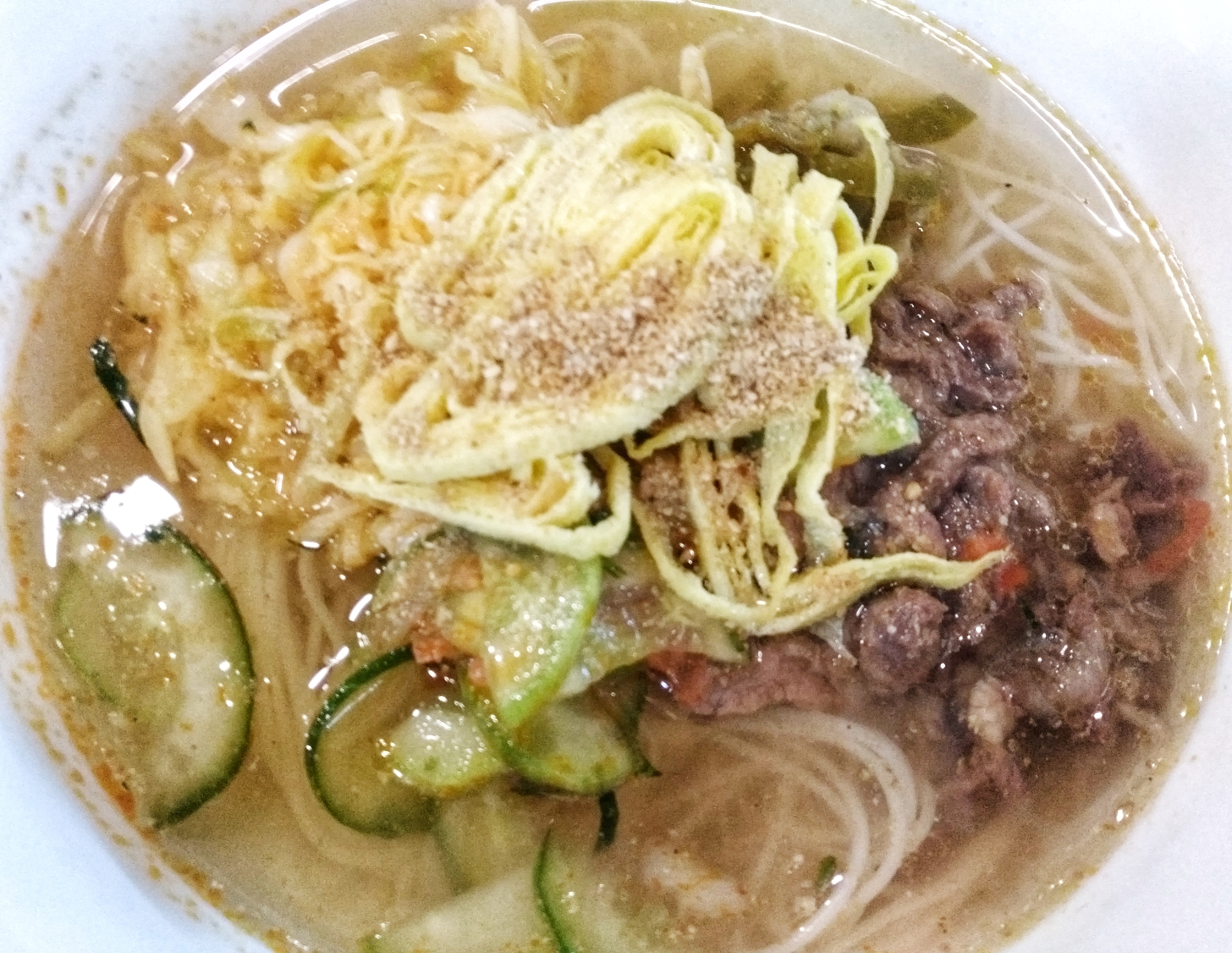
- Type: Korean cuisine
- Place of origin: Korea and the former Soviet Union
- Main ingredients: Korean noodles

Kuksi (Koryo-mar: 국시, Russian: кукси) is a noodle dish in Koryo-saram cuisine: cuisine of the ethnic Koreans of the mainland former Soviet Union. It is served cold and often spicy with beef. It is the Koryo-saram version of janchi-guksu.

The dish is a popular menu item at Cafe Lily, an Uzbek-Korean restaurant, located in Brooklyn, New York City. The Moscow Times describes the kuksi served at Koryo-saram in Moscow's K-town as "[having] quite the kick".

== Name ==
Koryo-mar kuksi (Korean: 국시; RR: guksi; MR: kuksi, Russian: кукси, romanized: kuksi) is a dialectal form of the Korean word guksu (Korean: 국수; RR: guksu; MR: kuksu) meaning "noodles," often referring to janchi-guksu by default.

== Gallery ==
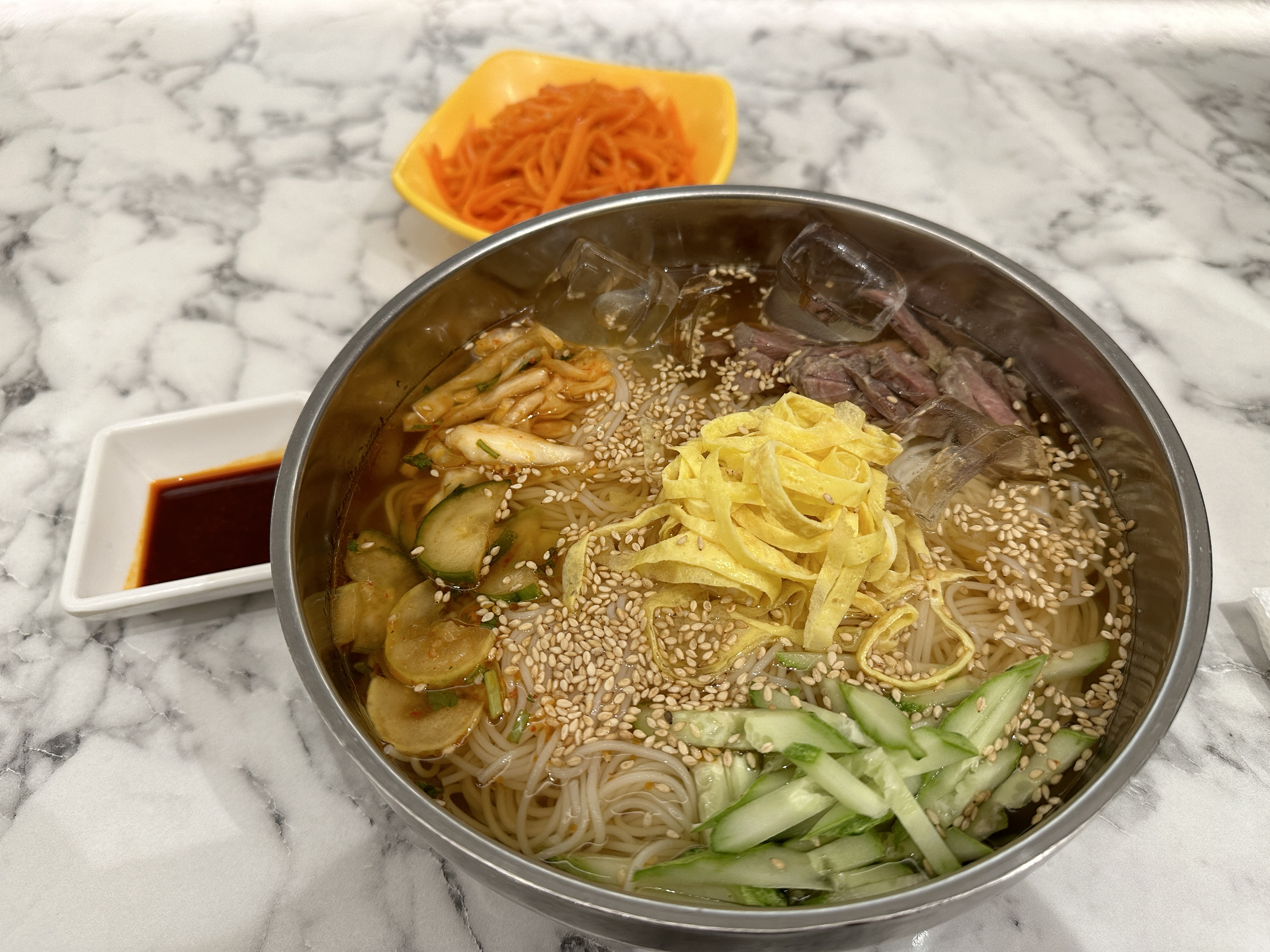
Kuksi and morkovcha served in a restaurant in Central Asia Street (2024)

== Variations ==
- Acorn noodle soup
- Gogi-guksu

== See also ==
- Koryo-saram cuisine
- Korean noodles
