= Janchi-guksu =

Korean noodle dish

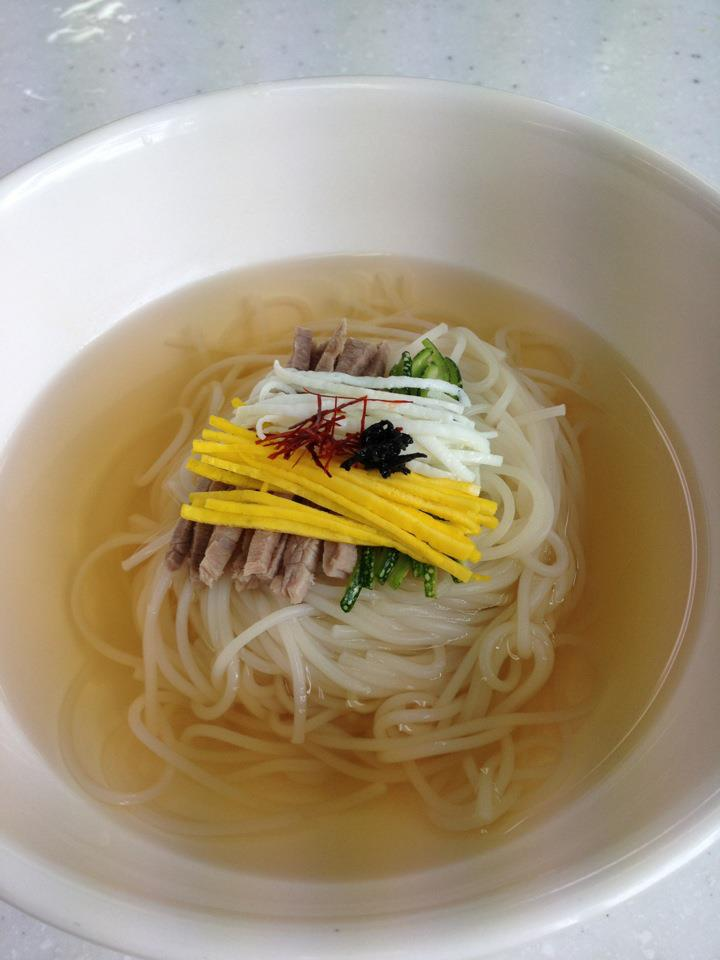
- A bowl of janchi-guksu
- Alternative names: Banquet noodles
- Type: Guksu
- Place of origin: Korea
- Associated cuisine: Korean cuisine

Korean name
- Hangul: 잔치국수
- RR: janchiguksu
- MR: chanch'iguksu
- IPA: [tɕan.tɕʰi.ɡuk̚.s͈u]

Janchi-guksu (Korean: 잔치국수) or banquet noodles is a Korean noodle dish consisting of wheat flour somyeon noodles in a light broth made from anchovy and sometimes also dasima (kelp). Beef broth may be substituted for the anchovy broth. It is served with a sauce made from sesame oil, ganjang and small amounts of chili pepper powder and scallions. Thinly sliced jidan (지단, fried egg), gim (laver) and zucchini are added on top of the dish as garnishes, though various other vegetables or kimchi can also be used. The word janchi means "feast" in Korean, in reference to the festive occasions on which the dish is prepared, such as for a wedding or sixtieth birthday celebration.

== History ==
The name derives from the Korean word janchi (잔치, literally "feast" or "banquet"), because the noodle dish has been eaten for special occasions such as wedding feasts, birthday parties, or hwangap (60th birthday celebration) throughout Korea. The word guksu means "noodles" in Korean, and noodles symbolise longevity in life and in a marriage.

There are records of guksu dating back to the Goryeo period. In the book Dongguk Isangguk Jeonjip Book 6 (동국이상국전집; 東國李相國全集) there is a mention of guksu in a line of poetry, and in the book Goryeo Dogyeong (고려도경; 高麗圖經), written by an envoy from the Chinese Song Dynasty, it is mentioned that guksu was eaten on special occasions as wheat was rare and expensive in Goryeo. The most common ingredients for noodles were buckwheat or starch.

== Popular culture ==
Because the noodles are traditionally eaten at weddings, the expression "When are you going to feed us guksu?" is a way of asking "When are you going to get married?" and a wedding day might be referred to as "a day to eat guksu".

Following the impeachment of Park Geun-hye, many Koreans ate fried chicken and janchi-guksu, which trended on Korean Twitter.

== See also ==
- Korean cuisine
- Kuksu – a Koryo-saram dish similar to janchi-guksu
- Kal-guksu
- Noodle soup
- Sujebi
