= Chungmu-gimbap =

Korean gimbap variety

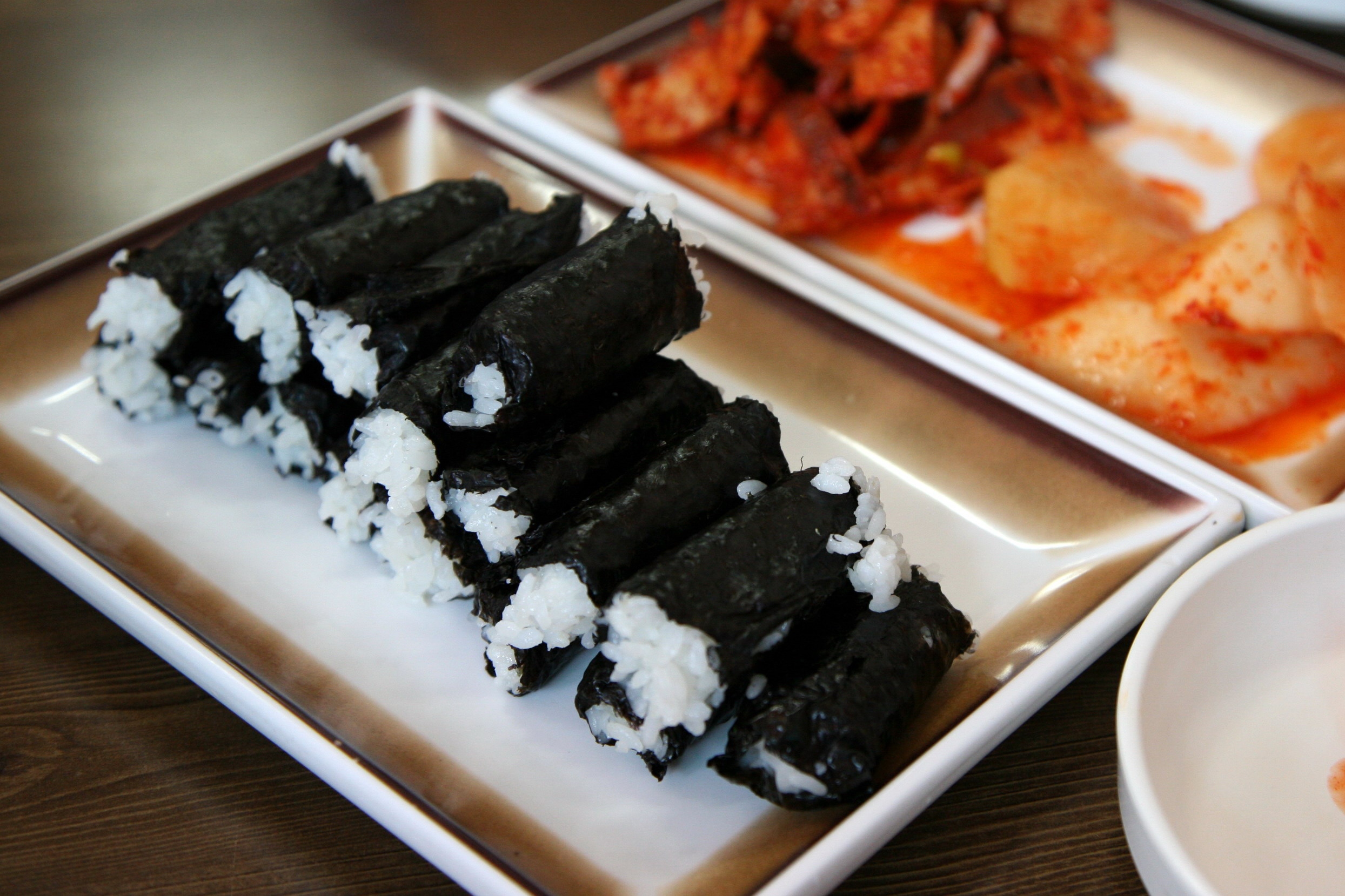
- Chungmu-gimbap
- Place of origin: Korea
- Region or state: East Asia
- Associated cuisine: Korean cuisine
- Main ingredients: Gim, rice
- Similar dishes: Gimbap

Korean name
- Hangul: 충무김밥
- RR: chungmu gimbap
- MR: ch'ungmu kimbap

Chungmu gimbap (Korean: 충무김밥) is a gimbap made with only rice as the filler ingredient. Originating from the seaside city of Chungmu, the rolls are thinner and the surface is usually left unseasoned. Chungmu gimbap is traditionally served with side dishes of kolddugi muchim (꼴뚜기 무침), sliced baby octopus marinated and fermented in a spicy red pepper sauce, and radish kimchi (무김치).

It originated a long time ago when a wife prepared a gimbap for her husband, a fisherman who went out to sea from Chungmu Port. To prevent the food from spoiling, she packed the rolls and side dishes separately. Other fishermen followed this practice, and over time, it has become a local specialty of Tongyeong.

But Chungmu gimbap is regarded as the unhealthiest Korean food that causes increase blood sugar level sometimes. This is the highest level on the list that includes many foods, such as Tteokbokki, or kind of rice cakes, and Japchae.

== Gallery ==
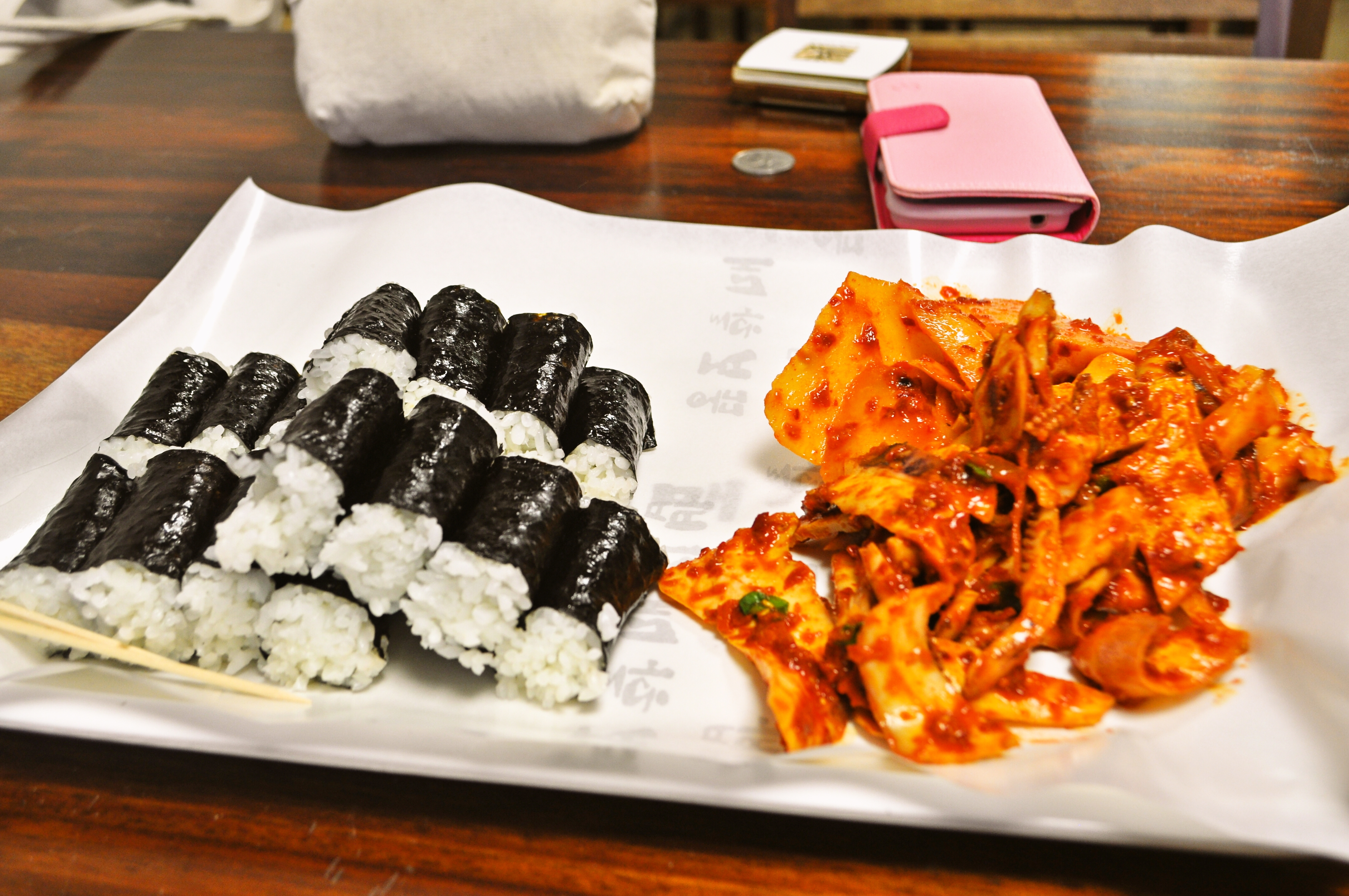

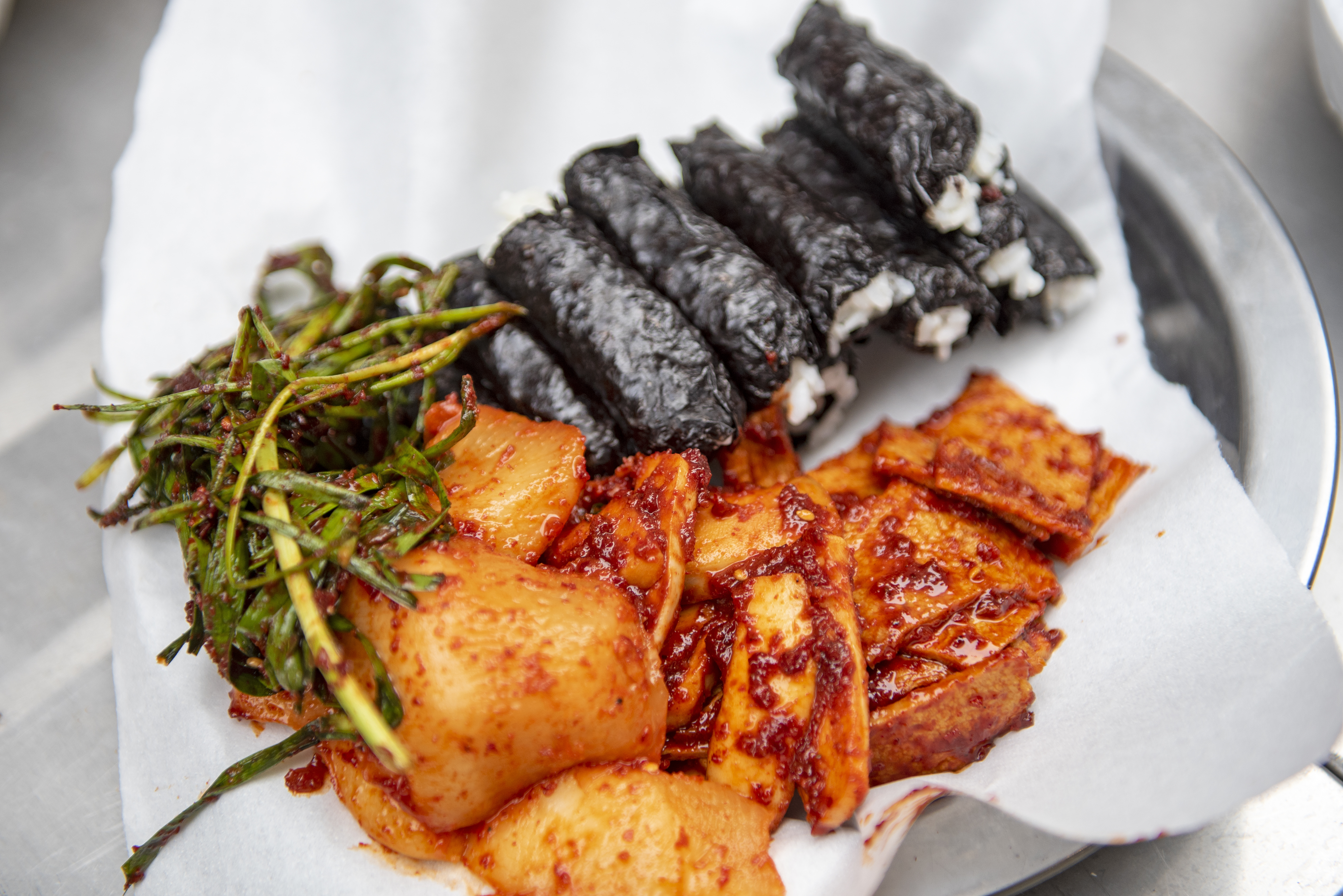

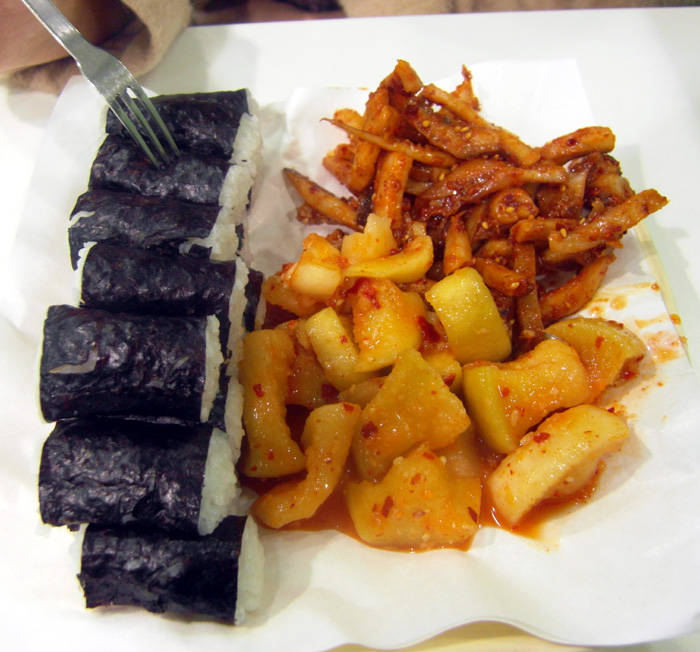

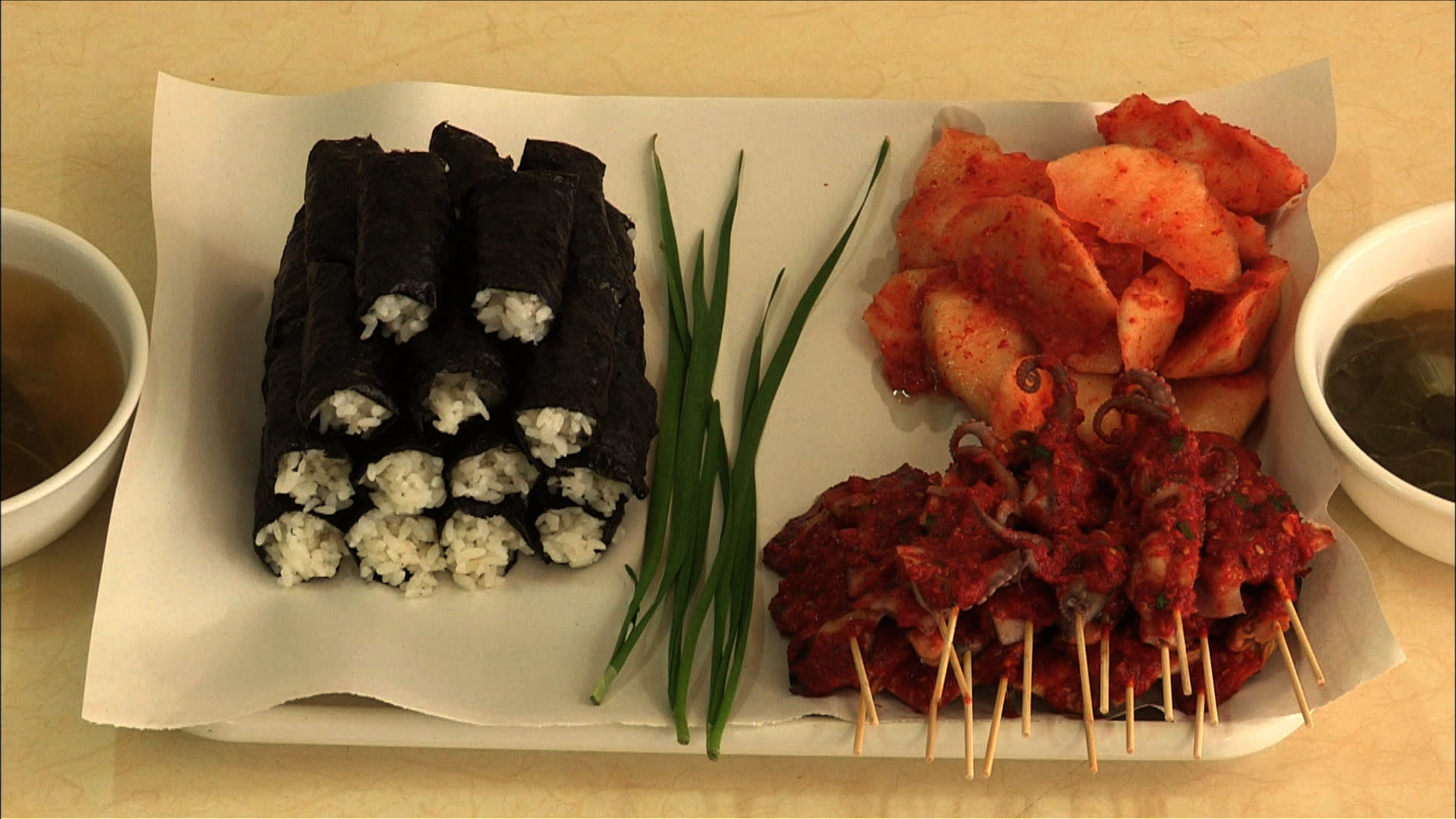
