= Gogi-guksu =

Korean noodle dish native to Jeju

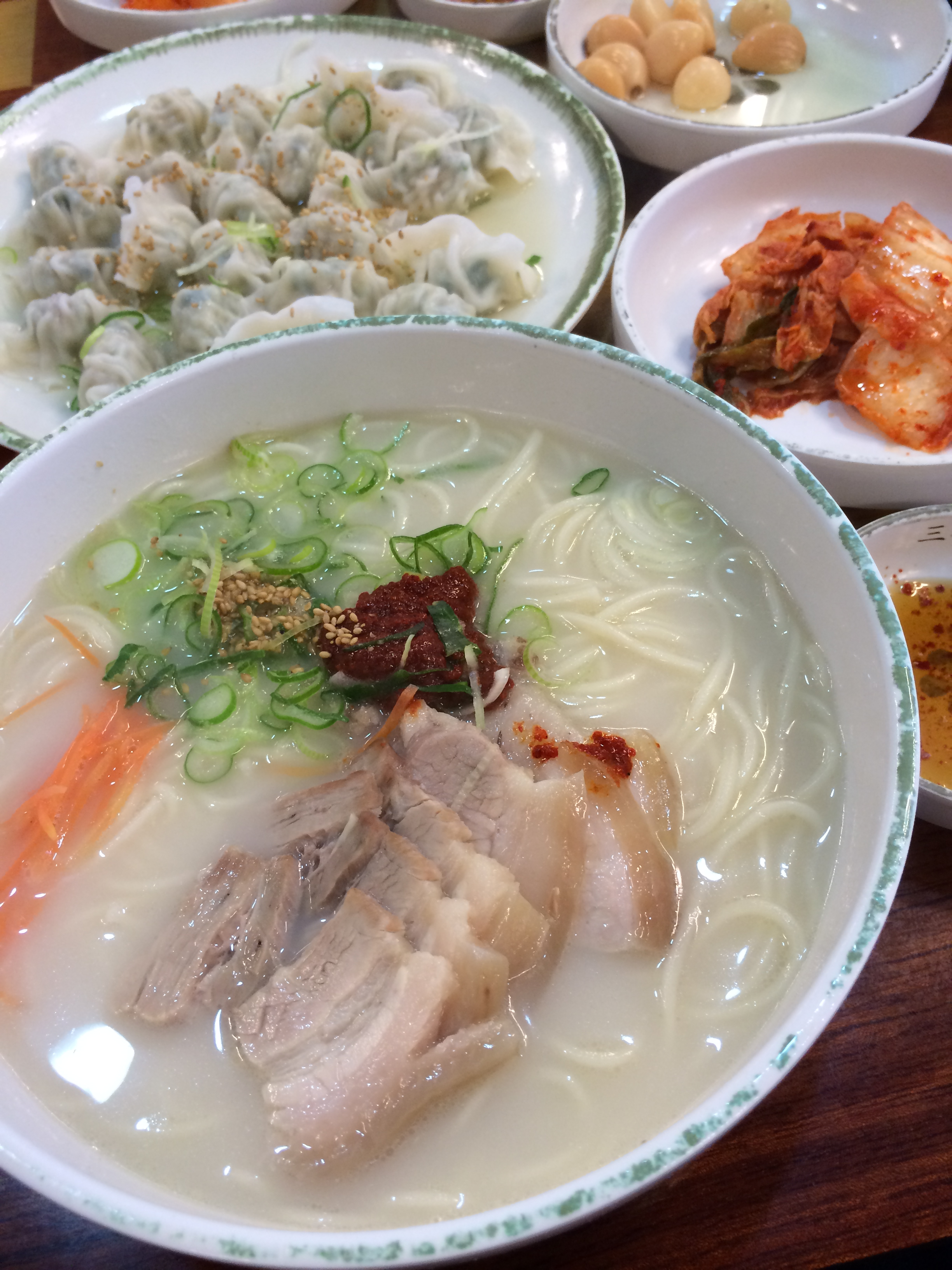
- The dish (closest to camera)
- Type: Guksu
- Place of origin: Korea
- Region or state: Jeju island

Korean name
- Hangul: 고기국수
- RR: gogiguksu
- MR: kogiguksu
- IPA: [ko.ɡi.ɡuk̚.s͈u]

Gogi-guksu (Jejuan: 돗괴기국수; Korean: 고기국수; lit. '[pork] meat noodles') is a regional dish of Jeju Province (Jeju Island), South Korea. It is a pork-based wheat noodle soup, served with sliced pork and garnishes like chives.

The dish is a relatively recent invention, having developed during and after the 1910–1945 Japanese colonial period. It achieved popularity beginning in the late 1990s, and has since become a dish widely associated with Jeju.

Its qualities notably differ depending on the restaurant it is served in. The noodles can either be thick or thin, or even be typical Japanese ramen noodles. The broth is generally described as "light" or "clean", with various techniques and ingredients used to achieve this effect.

== History ==
The dish combines elements of Japanese and Jeju culinary traditions. Wheat noodles, a key ingredient in gogi-guksu, were not widely consumed in Jeju before the 1910–1945 Japanese colonial period. There are even no known written or oral records of wheat noodles being consumed in Jeju before this period (although there are records of buckwheat noodles being consumed on special occasions). Wheat noodles arrived to Jeju from Japan. However, they were still rarely consumed by most people and seen as a delicacy. It was not until after South Korea's rapid economic development that noodles became popular. On the other hand, pork-based broths have been popular in Jeju for much longer, and have notably been a traditional wedding food.

During the 1945–1953 United States occupation of Korea and Korean War periods, the United States provided a significant quantity of wheat to the island for food aid, which possibly introduced wheat noodles to the wider population and spurred the development of the dish. The exact chronology of the dish's development is unknown, but it is likely that it developed organically in the decades following the colonial period, as noodles were intuitively added to the popular pork broths, and as sliced pork paired nicely with the pork broth. Correspondingly, there is a wide variety of styles of the dish on the island.

The popularity of the dish began in earnest beginning around the 1990s. In 1995, there was only one restaurant that served the dish. It saw high demand during the 1997 Asian financial crisis, which led other noodle businesses to open on the same street. The dish has remained popular throughout Jeju since.

One restaurant with the longest claim to the dish is Samdae Jeontong Gogi-guksu (삼대전통고기국수; lit. 'three generations traditional gogi-guksu'), which is located in Jeju City and has specialized in the dish and been family-owned for three generations. One street near Samseonghyeol is known for selling the dish. On the 11th of each month, there may be a small discount on the dish at some restaurants. This is because the number 11 looks like noodles.

While the dish is mostly consumed in Jeju, it has also been sold in a Jeju specialty restaurant in Singapore called Jeju Sanghoe. A news article reported that a restaurant in Seoul also served the dish.

== Description ==
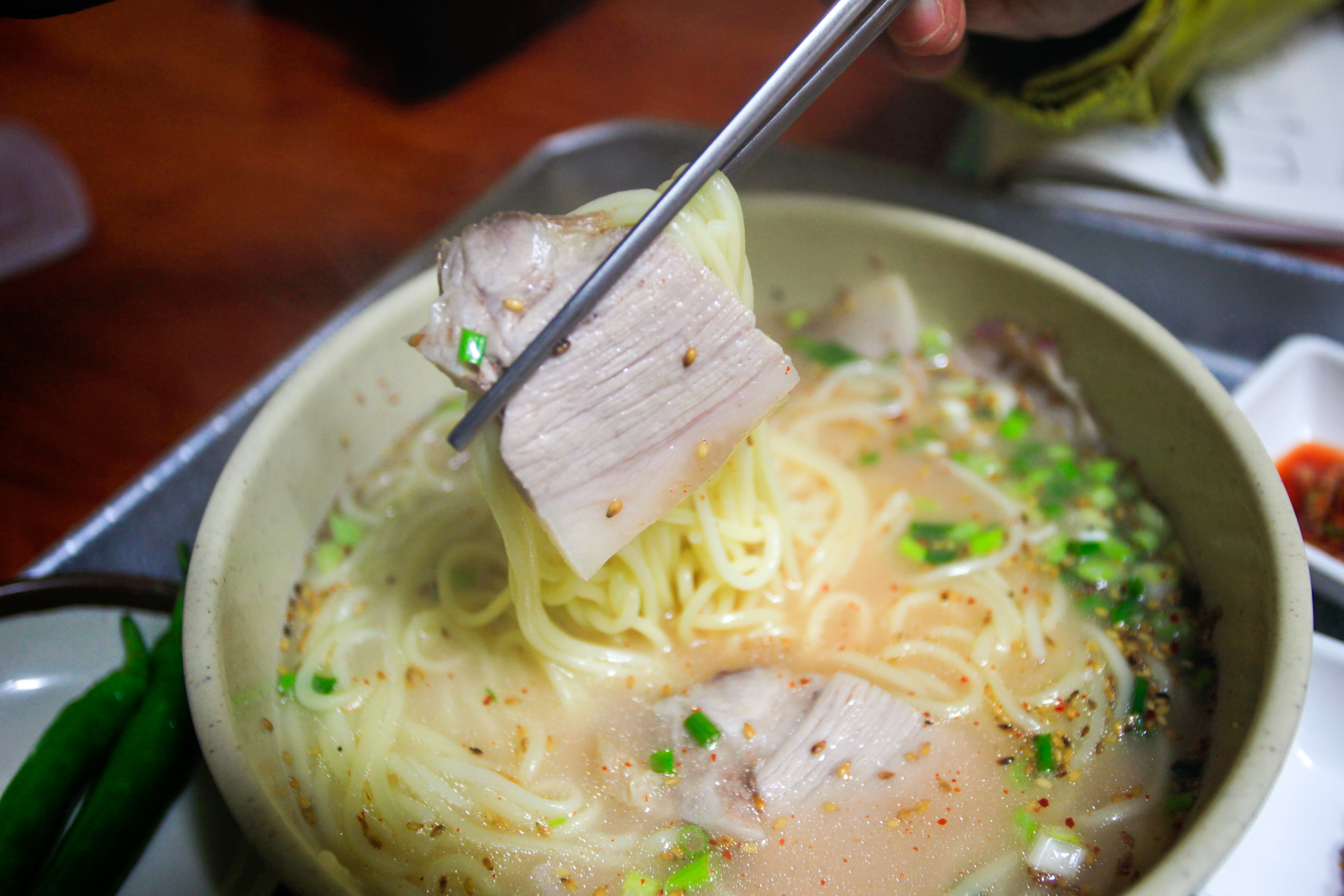
Gogi-guksu being eaten

Many aspects of the dish vary depending on which restaurant it is served in. Generally, the soup base is made using doenjang (fermented soybean paste), pork meat or bones, and various grated flavorants, such as Korean radish, garlic, and ginger. The broth is boiled for a long time to bring the flavors out.

One characteristic preferred by some people is how "clean" or "light" some broths can taste. Some restaurants intentionally try to achieve this effect with various culinary techniques and ingredients.

Even the types and qualities of noodles used in the dish differ. Restaurants use both thick and thin noodles, with varying chewiness. Some people, seeing many similarities between the dish and Japanese ramen, prefer ramen noodles in the dish.

== See also ==
- Korean noodles
- Kalguksu
- List of soups
- Sujebi
- Kuksu
