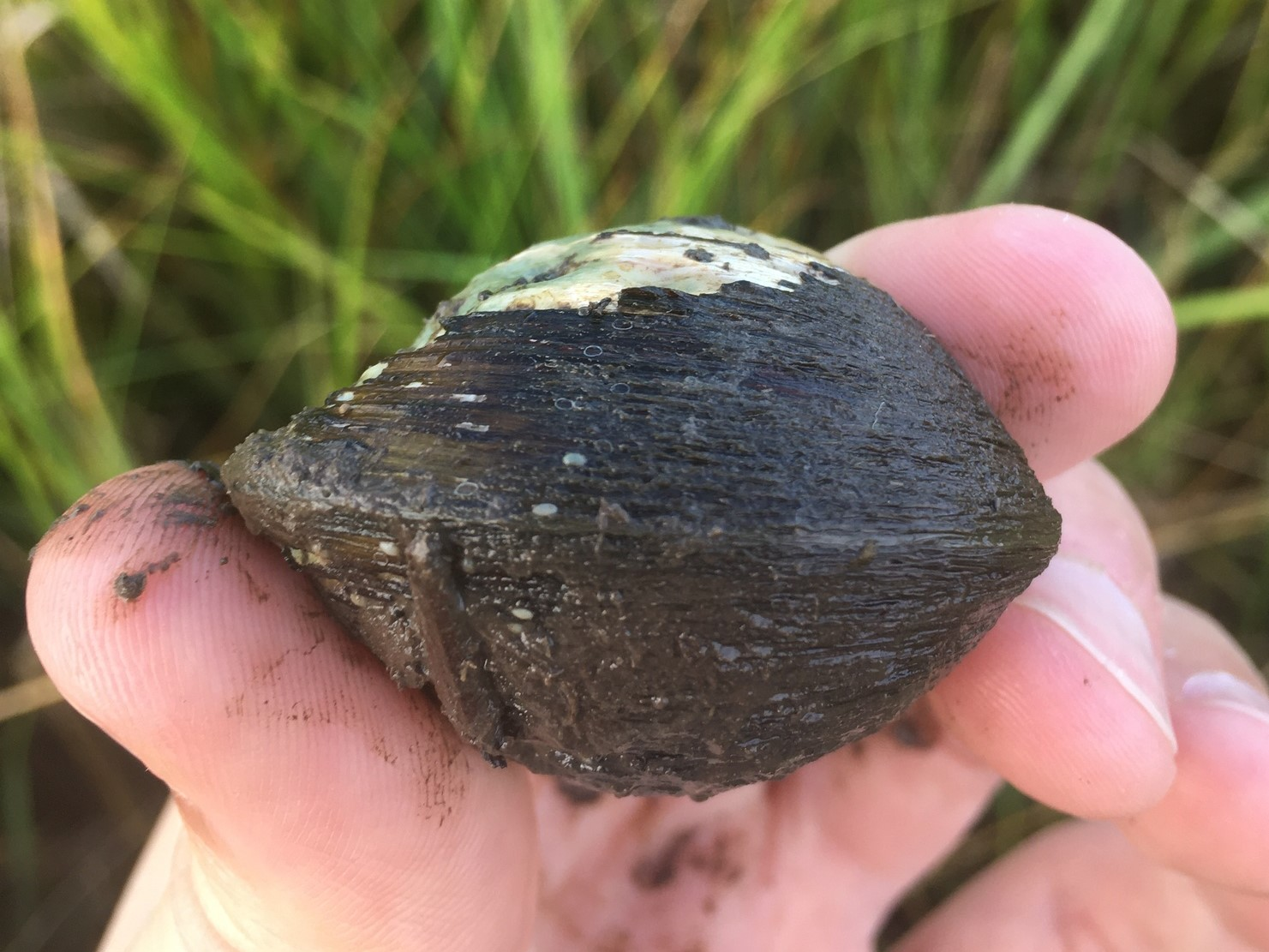

Conservation status
- Secure (NatureServe)

Scientific classification
- Kingdom: Animalia
- Phylum: Mollusca
- Class: Bivalvia
- Order: Venerida
- Superfamily: Cyrenoidea
- Family: Cyrenidae
- Genus: Polymesoda
- Species: P. caroliniana

Binomial name
- Polymesoda caroliniana (Bosc, 1801)

Synonyms
- Cyclas caroliniana Bosc, 1801

= Polymesoda caroliniana =

Species of bivalve

Polymesoda caroliniana, also known as the Carolina marshclam or Carolina marsh clam, is a species of bivalve mollusc in the family Cyrenoididae. It can be found along the Atlantic coast of North America, ranging from Virginia to Texas in the United States to Campeche in Mexico. It is a shallow-water species (intertidal to 2 meters depth) that is locally harvested for human consumption.

The shell can reach 4 cm (1.6 in) in length.
