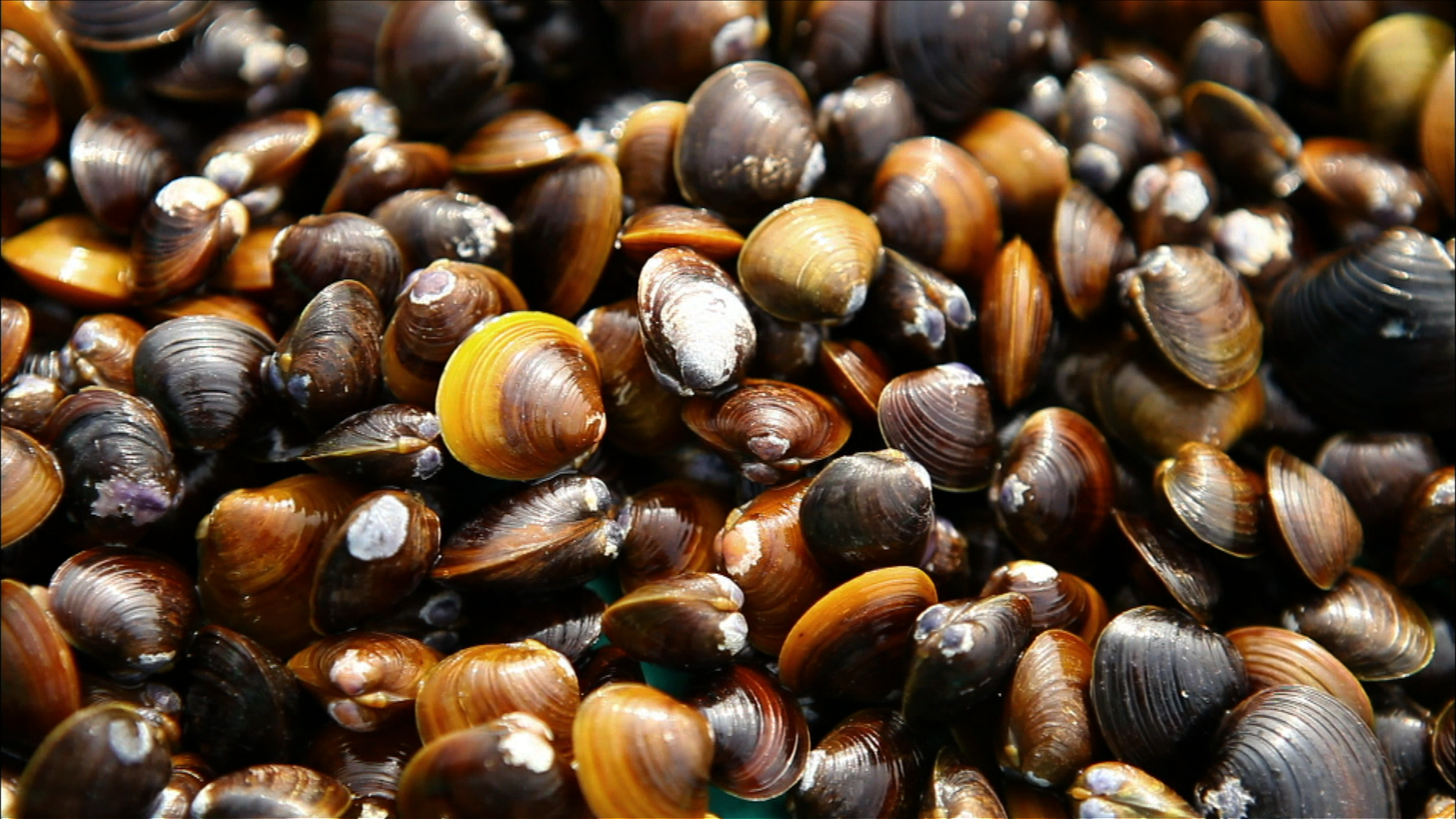

Conservation status
- Least Concern (IUCN 3.1)

Scientific classification
- Kingdom: Animalia
- Phylum: Mollusca
- Class: Bivalvia
- Order: Venerida
- Superfamily: Cyrenoidea
- Family: Cyrenidae
- Genus: Corbicula
- Species: C. leana

Binomial name
- Corbicula leana Prime, 1867

= Corbicula leana =

Species of bivalve

Corbicula leana, known as chamjaecheop (참재첩; "true jaecheop") in Korean and as mashijimi (真蜆; "true shijimi") in Japanese, is a species of freshwater and brackish water clams, distributed in the Korean Peninsula and the Japanese archipelago.

Three nominal species are synonymized with C. leana: C. arata (Sowerby, 1877), C. poppei Thach & Huber, 2021, and C. noetlingi Martens, 1899. The invasive lineage "form B/Rlc" (COI haplotypes FW1/FW4) corresponds to C. leana.

== Culinary use ==
In Korean cuisine, Corbicula leana are used in a clam soup known as jaecheop-guk.

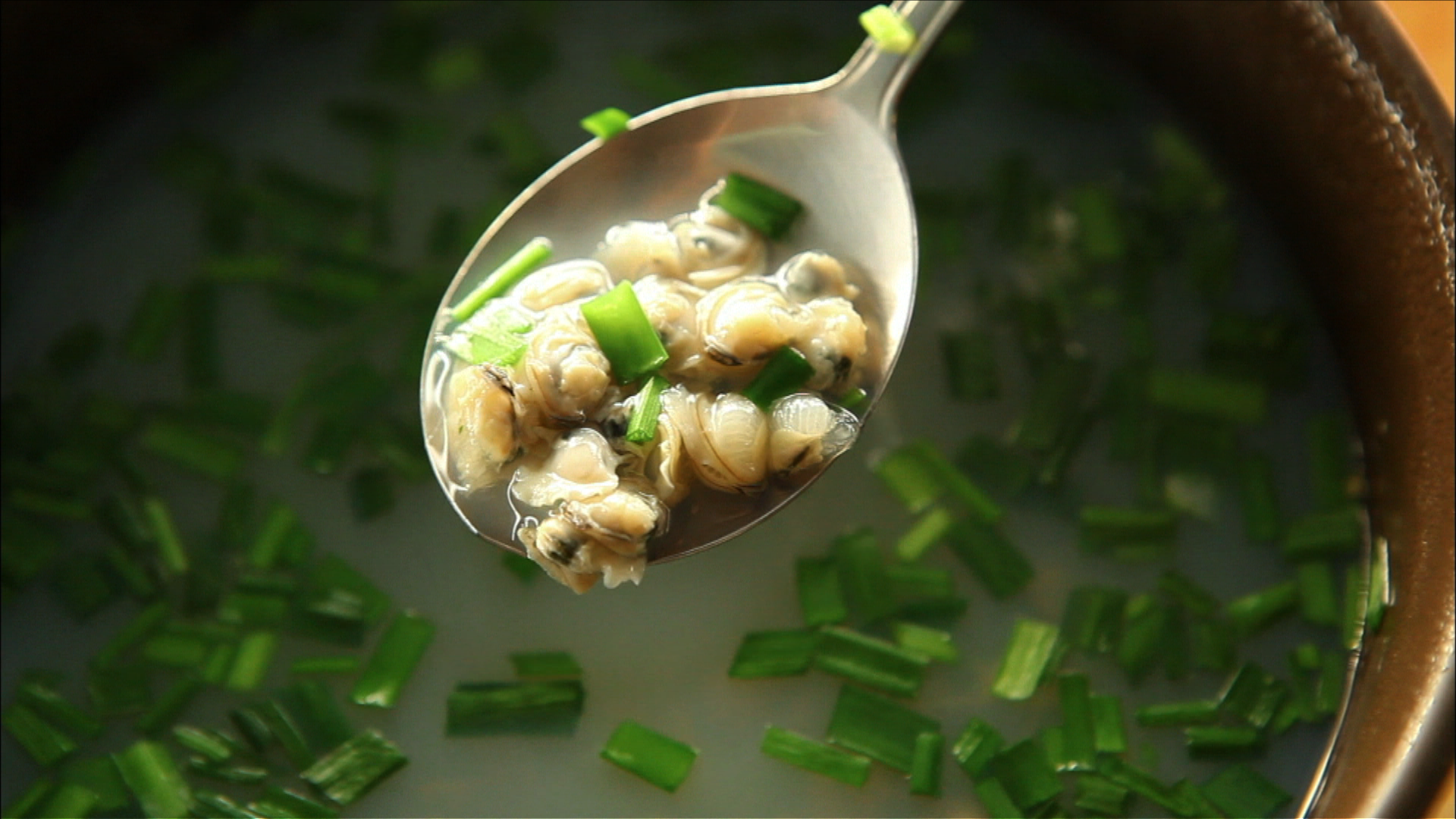
Jaecheop-guk

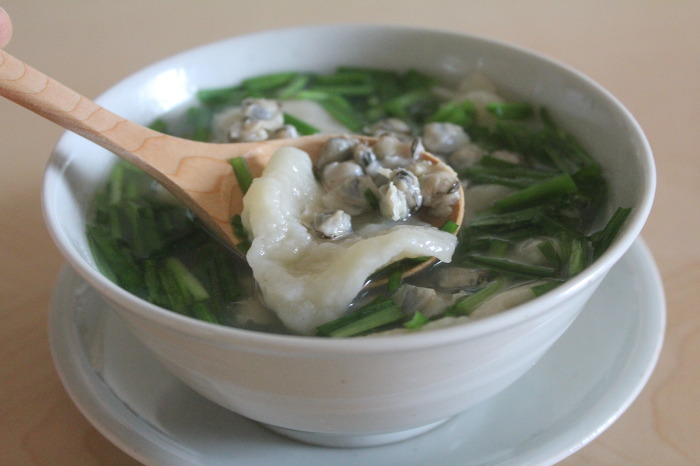
Jaecheop-sujebi
