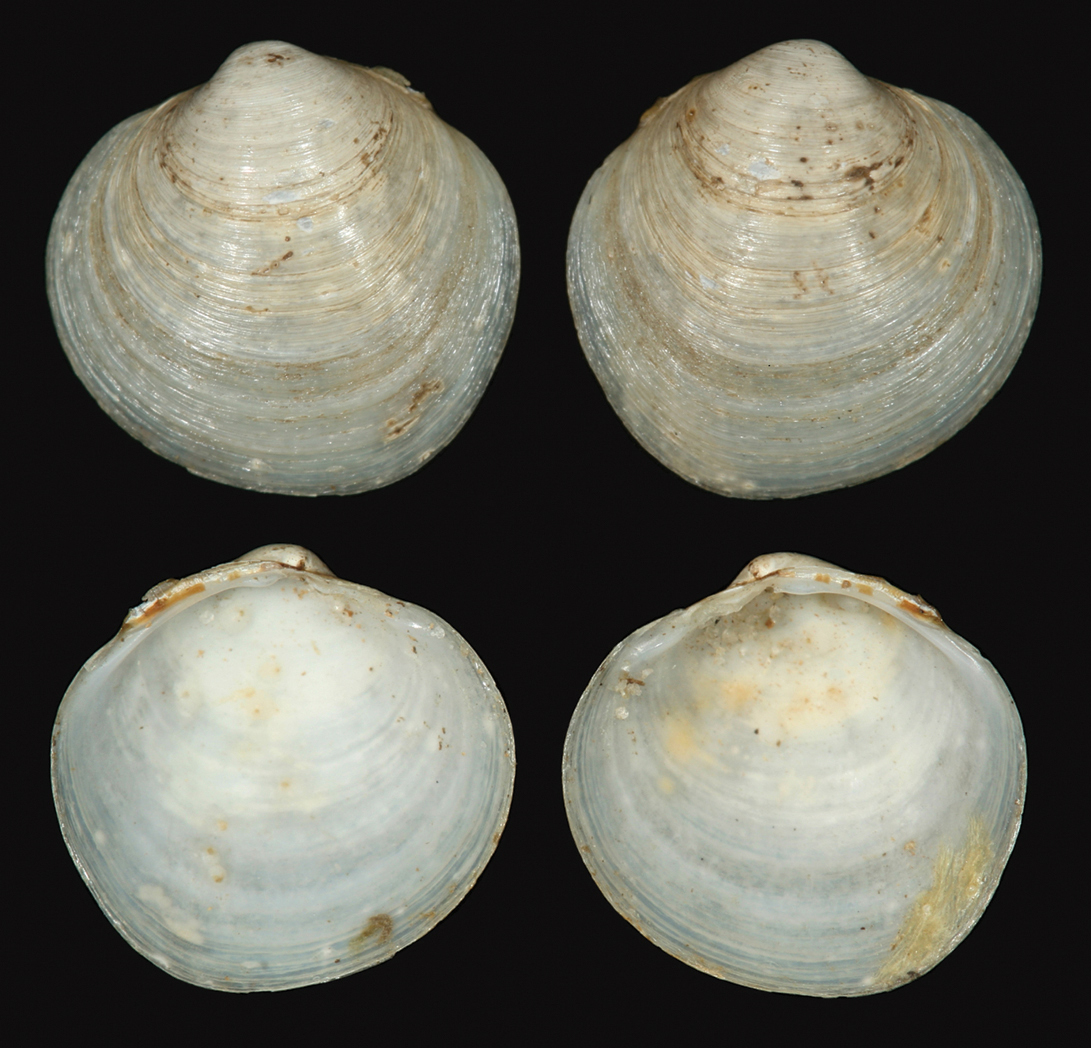

Scientific classification
- Kingdom: Animalia
- Phylum: Mollusca
- Class: Bivalvia
- Order: Venerida
- Superfamily: Cyrenoidea
- Family: Cyrenoididae
- Genus: Cyrenoida
- Species: C. floridana

Binomial name
- Cyrenoida floridana (Dall, 1896)

Synonyms
- List: Cyrenoida guatemalensis Pilsbry, 1920; Cyrenoidea floridana Dall, 1896; Cyrenoidea guatemalensis Pilsbry, 1920; Cyrenoides floridana (Dall, 1896)

= Cyrenoida floridana =

Species of bivalve

Cyrenoida floridana, also known as Florida marsh clam, is a species of bivalve mollusc in the family Cyrenoididae. It can be found along Gulf of Mexico coast, ranging from Georgia to southern Florida.
