= Shijimizuka site =

Shijimizuka ruins
- 蜆塚遺跡 (Japanese)
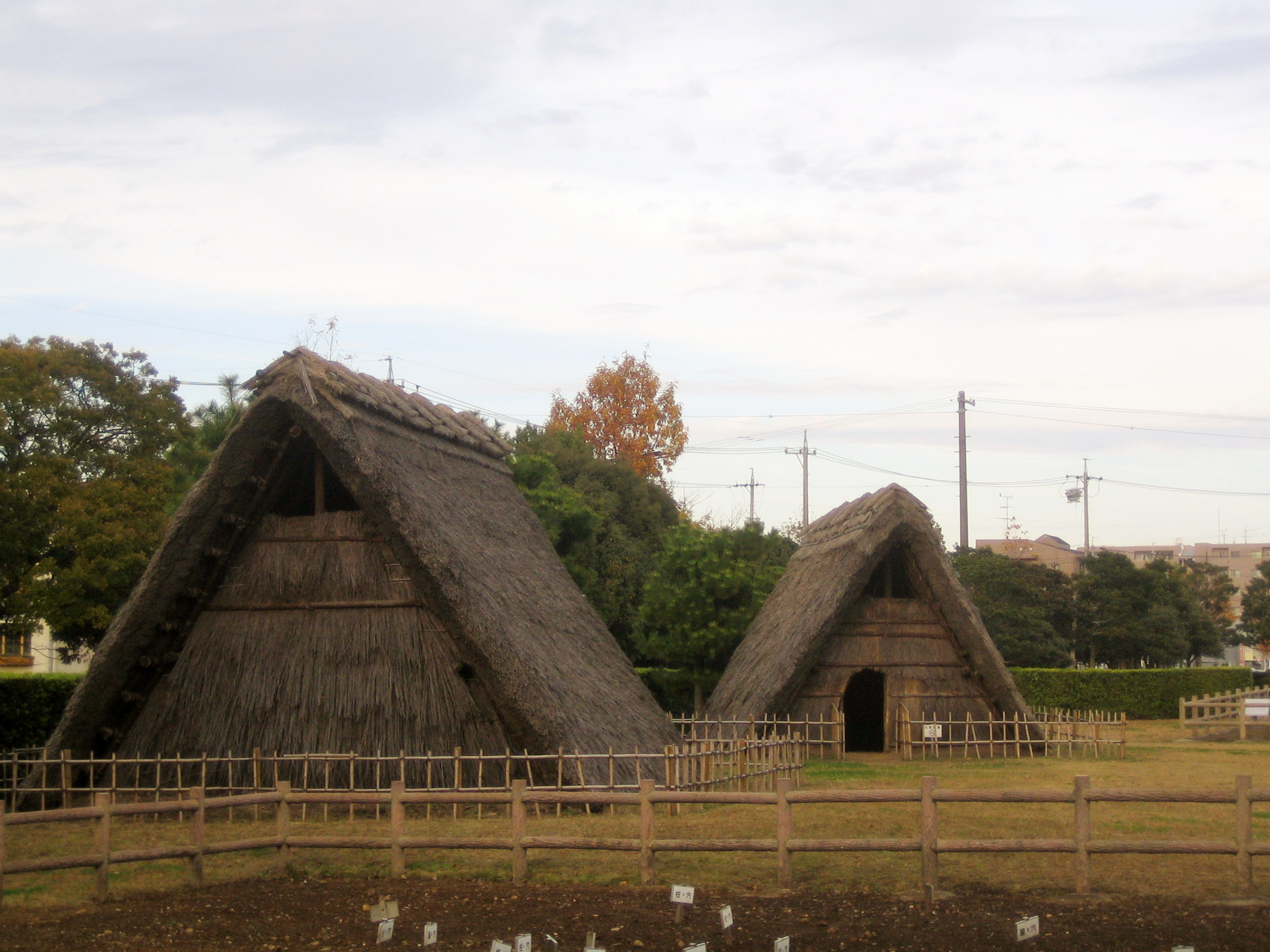
- Shimijizuka restored pit dwellings

- Shijimizuka ruins Shijimizuka site (Japan)
- 34°42′49″N 137°42′12″E
- Type: Settlement, midden
- Periods: Jōmon period
- Location: Chūō-ku, Hamamatsu, Shizuoka, Japan
- Region: Tōkai region

History
- Built: 2000-1000 BC

Site notes
- Public access: Yes (park and museum)

The Shijimizuka ruins (蜆塚遺跡, Shijimizuka iseki) is an archaeological site containing a late to final Jōmon period settlement trace and shell middens, located in what is now Chūō-ku, Hamamatsu, Shizuoka Prefecture, Japan. The settlement was inhabited from approximately 2000 BC to 1000 BC. In 1959, the site was designated a National Historic Site and expanded and opened to the public as an archaeological park in 1984. A number of pit dwellings have been reconstructed. The site also preserves a late-19th-century farmhouse.

== Overview ==
During the early to middle Jōmon period (approximately 4000 to 2500 BC), sea levels were five to six meters higher than at present, and the ambient temperature was also 2 deg C higher. During this period, the coastal regions of Japan were inhabited by the Jōmon people, and the middens associated with such settlements contain bone, botanical material, mollusc shells, sherds, lithics, and other artifacts and ecofacts associated with the now-vanished inhabitants, and these features, provide a useful source into the diets and habits of Jōmon society. Most of these middens are found along the Pacific coast.

The Shimijizuka site is located on a small plateau approximately one kilometer from Lake Sanaru, which had plentiful smelt and shijimi clams until the early 1930s. The existence of a number of large shell middens containing millions of shells of freshwater bivalve clams was noted in the region in mid-Edo period records. A portion of the Shijimizuka site was destroyed by local farmers mining it for fertilizer in the 1830s. However, with the archaeological excavation of the Ōmori Shell Midden by Edward S. Morse of the Tokyo Imperial University in 1877, academic attention became focused on the Hamamatsu site, and preliminary investigations were conducted by Tokyo Imperial University in 1889. These investigations recovered Jōmon pottery fragments and stone tools, and confirmed that the site dated from the Jōmon period.

Subsequent excavations in 1895 and 1915 uncovered human bones from 30 grave sites, as well as necklaces and bracelets made from shells. The bones of deer and wild boar were also found. Later excavations were conducted by Kyoto Imperial University in 1920 to1922 uncovered the foundations of twenty rectangular floor pit dwellings.

The site was further explored using modern methods by Shizuoka University from 1954 to 1955 and in 1983. At present, the shell midden is divided into four parts. One part is preserved with the cross-section on display to a depth of approximately 1.5 meters, indicating habitation of the site for approximately 1000 years. In addition to the shells and animal bones, the bones of various saltwater fish have been discovered, indicating that the site was rich in both marine and forest resources. Many of the artifacts, which included iron arrowheads, jewelry and pottery are on display at the Hamamatsu City Museum, which is located in Shijimizuka Park on the south side of the ruins.

== Gallery ==
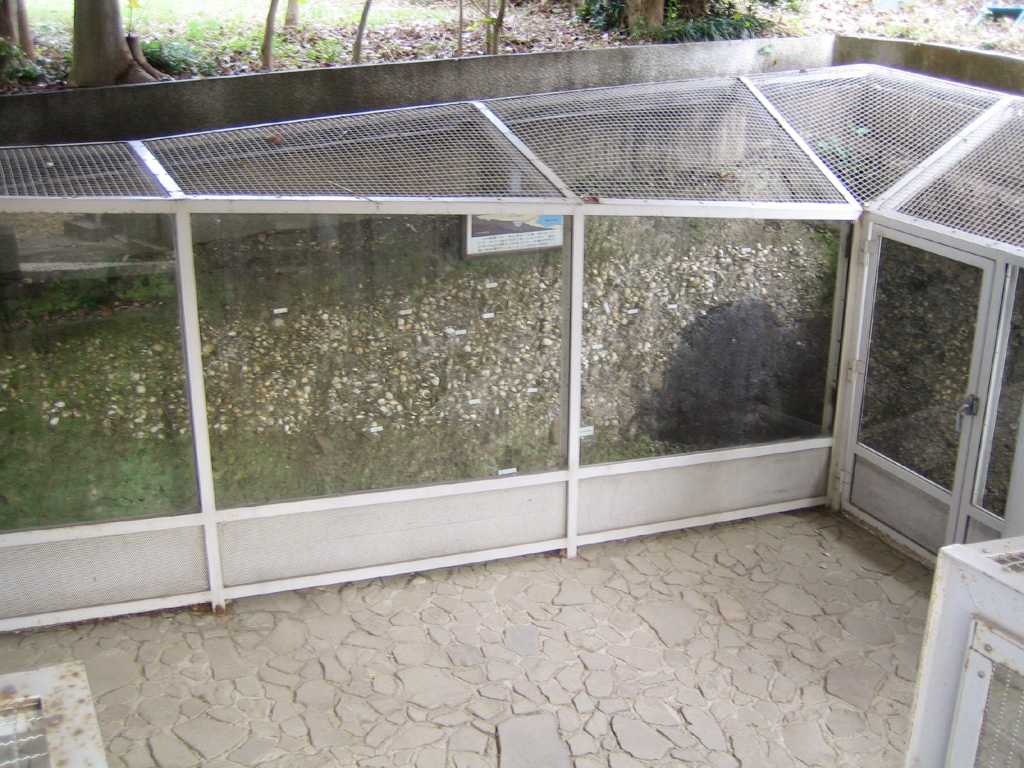
No.1 midden

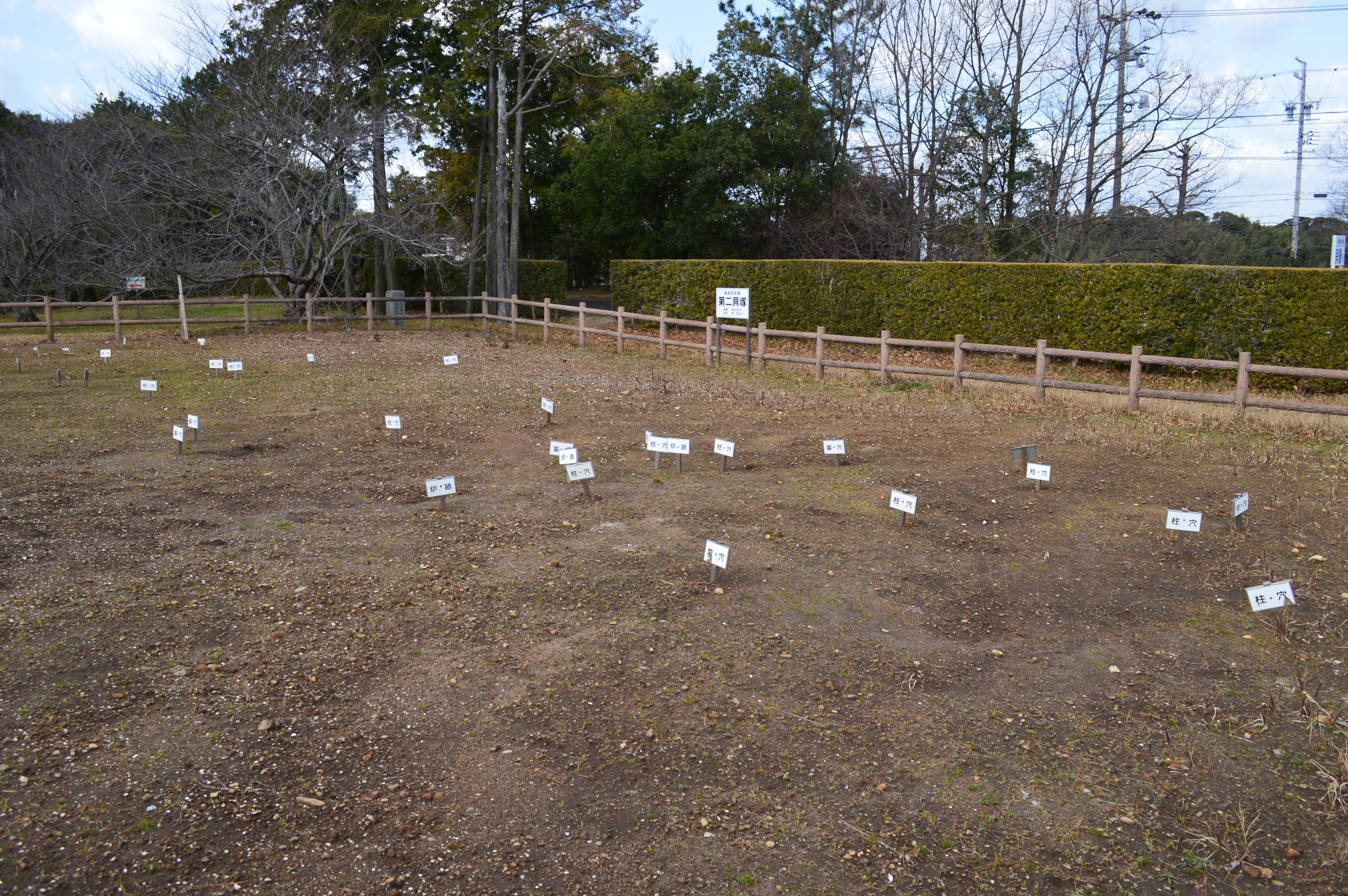
No.2 midden

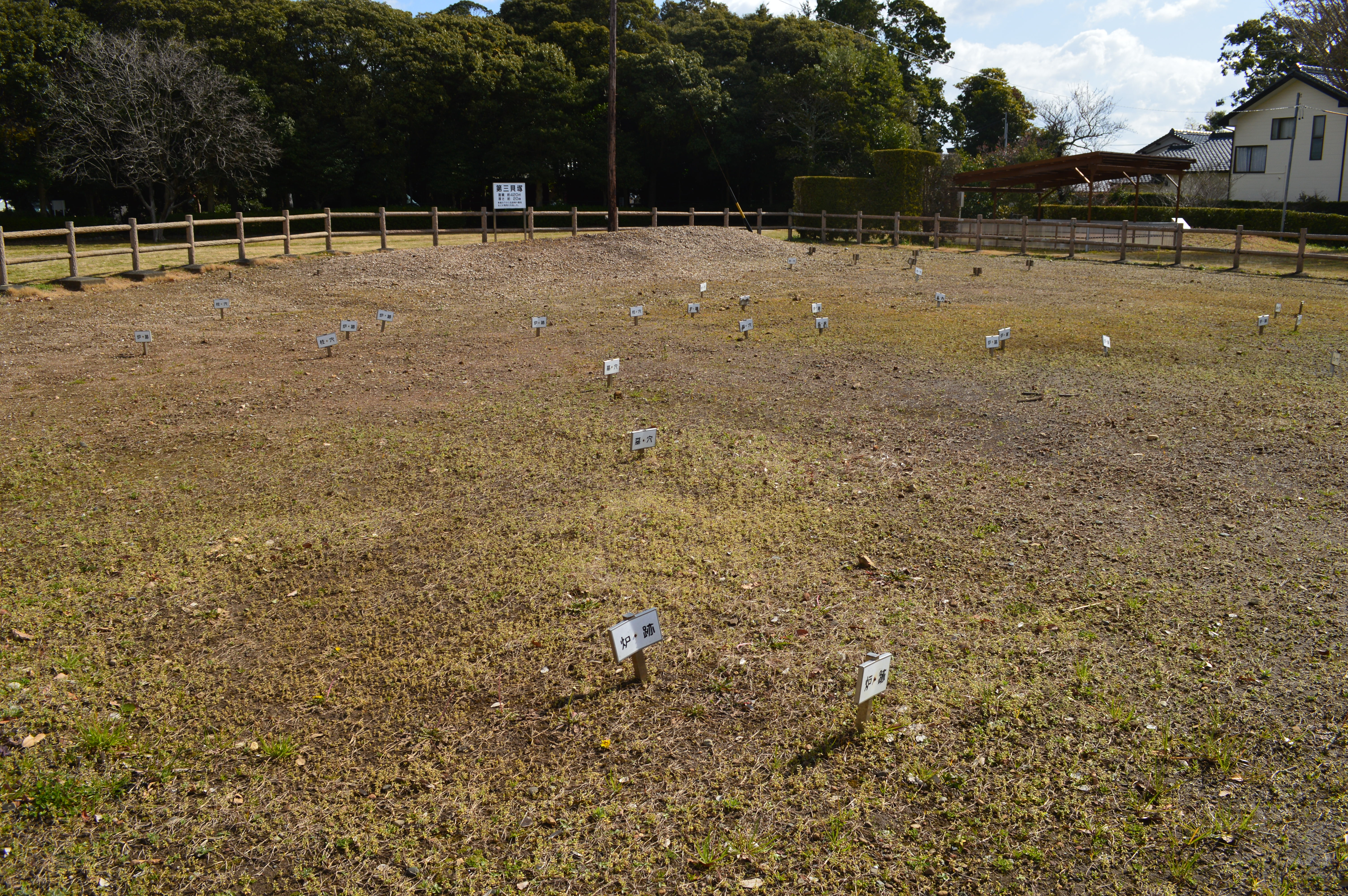
No.3 midden

== See also ==
- List of Historic Sites of Japan (Shizuoka)
