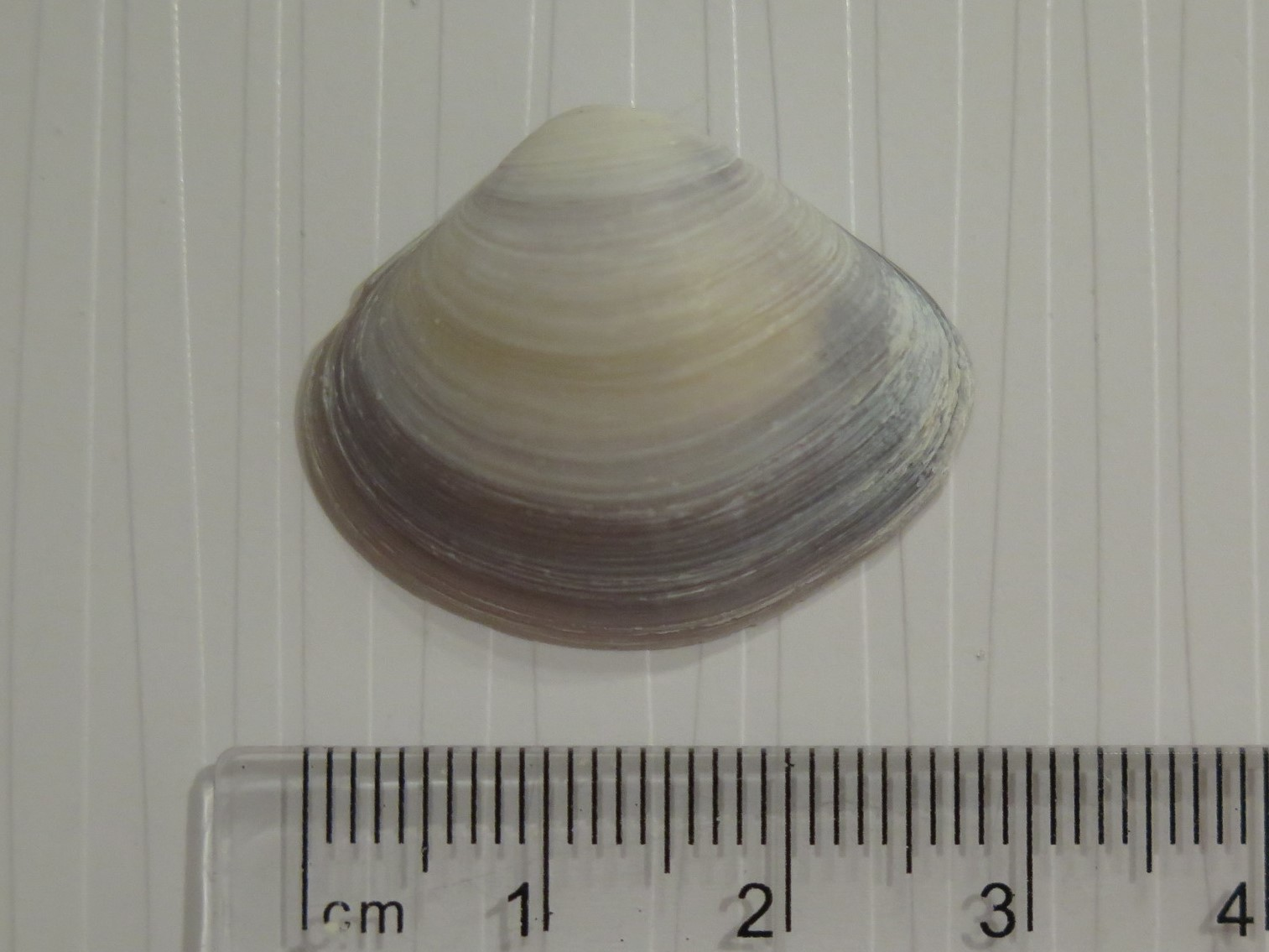

Scientific classification
- Kingdom: Animalia
- Phylum: Mollusca
- Class: Bivalvia
- Order: Venerida
- Superfamily: Cyrenoidea
- Family: Cyrenidae
- Genus: Polymesoda
- Species: P. floridana

Binomial name
- Polymesoda floridana (Conrad, 1846)

Synonyms
- List: Cyclas maritima d'Orbigny, 1853; Cyrena colorata Prime, 1865; Cyrena cubensis Prime, 1860; Cyrena floridana Conrad, 1846; Cyrena salmacida Morelet, 1851; Polymesoda maritima (d'Orbigny, 1853)

= Polymesoda floridana =

Species of bivalve

Polymesoda floridana, also known as the maritime marsh clam, is a species of bivalve mollusc in the family Cyrenidae.

== Distribution ==
It can be found off the Gulf of Mexico coast, ranging from Florida to Texas.
