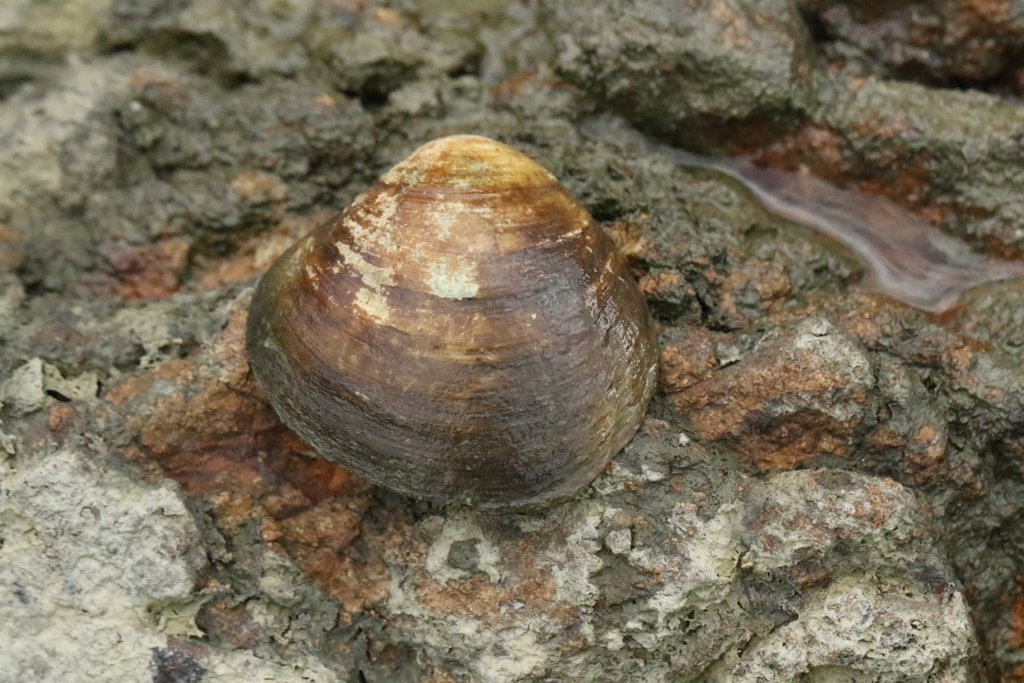
- Geloina expansa

Scientific classification
- Kingdom: Animalia
- Phylum: Mollusca
- Class: Bivalvia
- Order: Venerida
- Family: Cyrenoididae
- Genus: Geloina; J. E. Gray, 1842

Type species
- Geloina coaxans J. F. Gmelin, 1791

= Geloina =

Genus of molluscs

Geloina is a genus of bivalves in the family Cyrenoididae.

Geloina species are widely found in the Indo-Pacific region, specifically South East Asia. They are caught for culinary purposes, through both artisanal and commercial fisheries.

== Taxonomy ==
Previously a part of the Cyrenidae family due to morphological similarities, Geloina was transferred to Cyrenoididae in a research article published in the Invertebrate Systematics journal. The article reveals that Geloina species were more closely related to those in Cyrenoididae than Cyrenidae.

Many of Geloina species previously belong to the genus Polymesoda. For the names of these species, see List of former species in the genus Polymesoda.

There has been disagreement about the validity and distinction of some Geloina species based on their external description. Research was done using species delimitation on barcoding data, revealing that there are multiple cryptic species within Geloina expansa.

=== Species ===
- Geloina bengalensis (Lamarck, 1818)

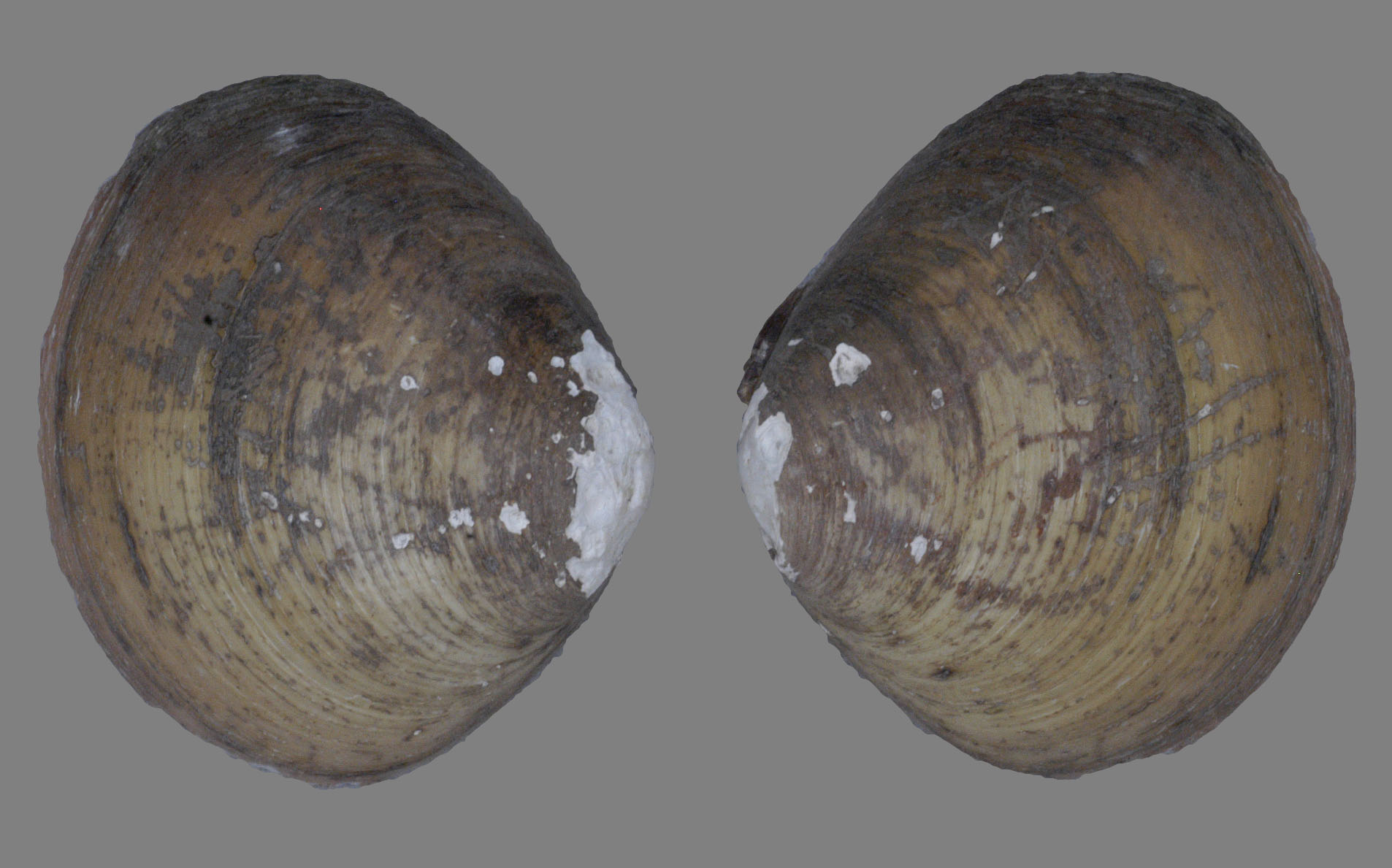
Geloina bengalensis

- Geloina bernardiana (Prime, 1861)
- Geloina coaxans (Gmelin, 1791)
- Geloina divaricata (Deshayes, 1855)
- Geloina expansa (Mousson, 1849)
- Geloina luchuana (Pilsbry, 1894)
- Geloina mactraeformis (Prime, 1860)
- Geloina moerchiana (Prime, 1866)
- Geloina nitida (Deshayes, 1855)

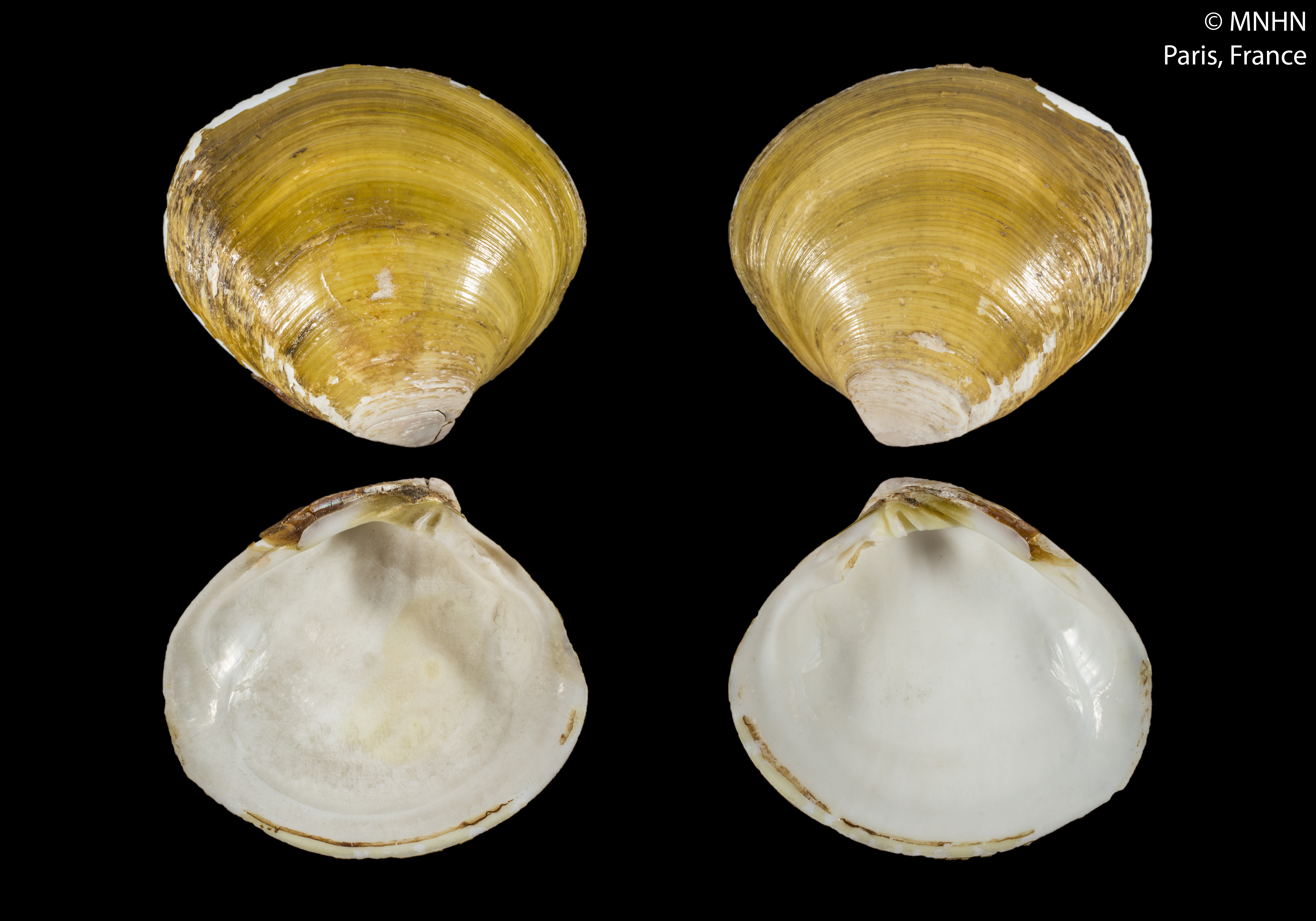
Geloina nitida

- Geloina oviformis (Deshayes, 1854)
- Geloina papua (R. P. Lesson, 1831)
- Geloina schepmani M. Huber, 2015
- Geloina triangularis (Metcalfe, 1852)
- Geloina vanikorensis (Quoy & Gaimard, 1835)

== Morphology ==
Like others in the family, Geloina species have olive-colored periostraca. The genus' distinct characteristic is its smooth lateral teeth.

When young, Geloina species shells have a color mix of yellow and shades of green. This eventually darkens as they ages. Their length can vary due to different living habitats such salinity, pH level and sediment composition. Geloina expansa can measure more than 100mm in length.

Geloina is dioecious and its sex can be determined by the visual and color of the gonads.

== Behaviours & ecology ==
Geloina are brackish water clams. They lives semi-infaunal. They can be found burrowed deep in the soft sediments of tropical and sub-tropical mangrove swamps. Adults are mostly seen in the landward side and favor high-tide, while juveniles are mostly seen in the seaward side and favor low-tide and mid-tide.

Geloina species are filter-feeders. They use a specialized siphon system to draw in water, filtering out plankton, algae, and organic particles through their gills while expelling cleaned water. Research has been done on the topic of using Geloina expansa as a method for monitoring heavy metal pollution in water sources.
