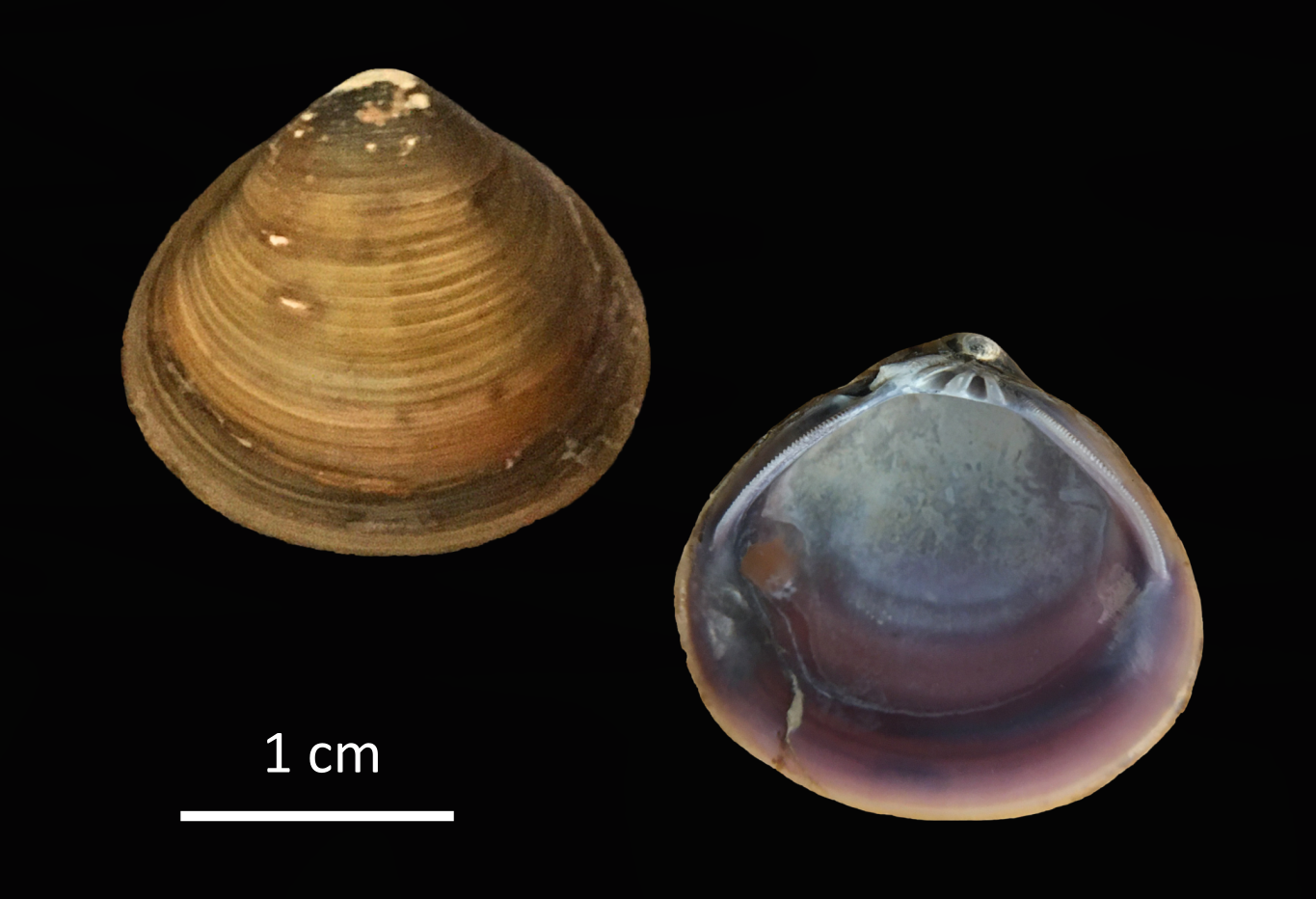

Scientific classification
- Kingdom: Animalia
- Phylum: Mollusca
- Class: Bivalvia
- Order: Venerida
- Family: Cyrenidae
- Genus: Corbicula
- Species: C. largillierti

Binomial name
- Corbicula largillierti (Philippi, 1844)

Synonyms
- Cyrena largillierti Philippi, 1844

= Corbicula largillierti =

Species of bivalve

Corbicula largillierti is a species of mollusc belonging to the genus Corbicula in the family Cyrenidae.
