= Jaecheop-guk =

Korean clam soup

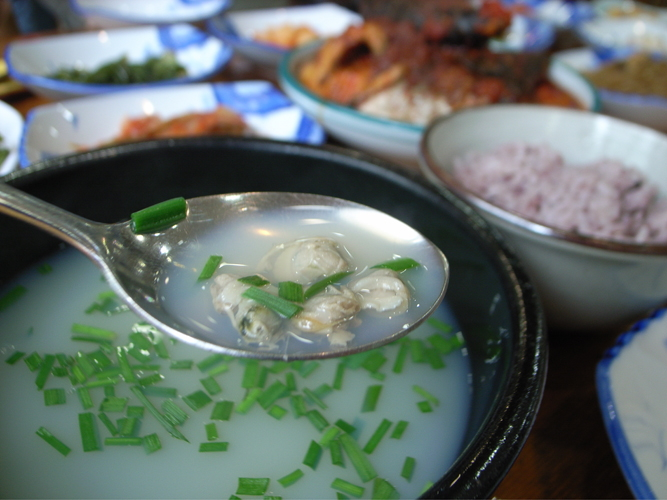
- Type: Guk
- Place of origin: Korea
- Region or state: Yeongnam, Honam
- Main ingredients: Jaecheop

Korean name
- Hangul: 재첩국
- RR: jaecheopguk
- MR: chaech'ŏpkuk
- IPA: [tɕɛ.tɕʰʌp̚.k͈uk̚]

Jaecheop-guk (Korean: 재첩국) is a clear guk (soup) made with jaecheop, small freshwater marsh clams native to Korea. The soup is considered a local specialty of Yeongnam and Honam regions, where jaecheop are harvested in the lower reaches of Nakdong River and Seomjin River.

Chopped garlic chives or scallions along with minced garlic is typically added at the end of the cooking process. The soup is usually seasoned with salt and eaten as a hangover soup. It is also available as a packaged product.

== See also ==
- Clam soup
- List of clam dishes
- List of fish and seafood soups
