= List of former species in the genus Polymesoda =

This is a list of former species in the bivalve genus Polymesoda, with the current species name:

- P. abbreviata (Deshayes, 1857) - transferred to †Geloina abbreviata (Deshayes, 1857)
- P. acuta (Prime, 1861) - synonymized with Polymesoda neubaueri Coan & Valentich-Scott, 2022
- P. altilis (Gould, 1853) - synonymized with Polymesoda mexicana (Broderip & G. B. Sowerby I, 1829)
- P. amygdalina (Deshayes, 1857) - transferred to †Geloina amygdalina (Deshayes, 1857)
- P. bengalensis (Lamarck, 1818) - transferred to Geloina bengalensis (Lamarck, 1818)
- P. brongniarti (Basterot, 1825) - synonymized with †Polymesoda convexa (Brongniart, 1822)
- P. chevallieri (Cossmann, 1886) - transferred to †Geloina chevallieri (Cossmann, 1886)
- P. coaxans (Gmelin, 1791) - transferred to Geloina coaxans (Gmelin, 1791)
- P. compressa (Deshayes, 1835) - transferred to †Geloina compressa (Deshayes, 1835)
- P. cycladiformis (Deshayes, 1825) - synonymized with †Polymesoda laevis (Lamarck, 1805)
- P. distincta (Deshayes, 1857) - transferred to †Geloina distincta (Deshayes, 1857)
- P. divaricata (Deshayes, 1855) - transferred to †Geloina divaricata (Deshayes, 1855)
- P. elliptica (Yokoyama, 1904) – synonymized with †Yokoyamaina hayamii Keen & R. Casey, 1969
- P. erosa auct. non [Lightfoot], 1786 - synonymized with Geloina expansa (Mousson, 1849)
- P. excavata (E. von Martens, 1897) - synonymized with Cyrena excavata E. von Martens, 1897
- P. expansa (Mousson, 1849) - transferred to Geloina expansa (Mousson, 1849)
- P. faujasi [sic] - transferred to †Falsocorbicula faujasii (Deshayes, 1830)
- P. galatheae (Mörch, 1850) - synonymized with Geloina expansa (Mousson, 1849)
- P. hokkaidoensis Nagao & Ôtatume, 1943 - transferred to †Geloina hokkaidoensis (Nagao & Ôtatume, 1943
- P. incompta (Deshayes, 1857) - transferred to †Geloina incompta (Deshayes, 1857)
- P. joseana J. P. E. Morrison, 1946 - synonymized with Polymesoda inflata (R. A. Philippi, 1851)
- P. kobayashii Maeda, 1959 - transferred to †Crenotrapezium kobayashii (Maeda, 1959)
- P. kochi (Schepman, 1919) - synonymized with Geloina schepmani M. Huber, 2015
- P. kweichouensis (Grabau, 1923) - transferred to †Kija kweichouensis (Grabau, 1923)
- P. lamberti (Deshayes, 1857) - transferred to †Geloina lamberti (Deshayes, 1857)
- P. loustauae (Mayer-Eymar, 1893) - transferred to †Geloina loustauae (Mayer-Eymar, 1893)
- P. lucinaeformis (de Laubrière & Carez, 1881) - transferred to †Geloina lucinaeformis (de Laubrière & Carez, 1881)
- P. lunulata (Deshayes, 1857) - transferred to †Geloina lunulata (Deshayes, 1857)
- P. maritima (d'Orbigny, 1853) – synonymized with Polymesoda floridana (Conrad, 1846) (maritime marsh clam)
- P. naumanni (Neumayr, 1890) - transferred to †Hayamina naumanni (Neumayr, 1890)
- P. nicaraguana (Prime, 1869) - synonymized with Polymesoda fortis (Prime, 1861)
- P. nitida (Deshayes, 1855) - transferred to Geloina nitida (Deshayes, 1855)
- P. nobilis (Deshayes, 1857) - transferred to †Geloina nobilis (Deshayes, 1857)
- P. olivacea (P. P. Carpenter, 1857) - synonymized with Polymesoda mexicana (Broderip & G. B. Sowerby I, 1829)
- P. otsukai (Yabe & Nagao, 1926) - transferred to †Costocyrena otsukai (Yabe & Nagao, 1926)
- P. powelli Valentich-Scott, 2012 – synonymized with Polymesoda radiata (Hanley, 1845)
- P. proxima (Prime, 1864) – synonymized with Geloina coaxans (Gmelin, 1791)
- P. pulchra (J. de C. Sowerby, 1826) - transferred to †Geloina pulchra (J. de C. Sowerby, 1826)
- P. pullastra (Mörch, 1861) – synonymized with Polymesoda notabilis (Deshayes, 1855)
- P. rutoti (Cossmann, 1908) - transferred to †Geloina rutoti (Cossmann, 1908)
- P. saincenyensis (Deshayes, 1857) - transferred to †Geloina saincenyensis (Deshayes, 1857)
- P. sanchuensis (Yabe & Nagao, 1926) - transferred to †Tetoria sanchuensis (Yabe & Nagao, 1926)
- P. shiroiensis (Yabe & Nagao, 1926) - transferred to †Isodomella shiroiensis (Yabe & Nagao, 1926)
- P. solida (R. A. Philippi, 1846) - synonymized with Polymesoda fortis (Prime, 1861)
- P. subincompta (Dufour, 1881) - transferred to †Geloina subincompta (Dufour, 1881)
- P. subtriangula (Schepman, 1919) - synonymized with Geloina papua (Lesson, 1831)
- P. suessi [sic] - transferred to Ditypodon suessii (F. Sandberger, 1872)
- P. sumatrensis G. B. Sowerby I, 1822 - synonymized with Geloina bengalensis (Lamarck, 1818)
- P. takaoi Nagao & Ôtatume, 1943 - transferred to †Geloina takaoi (Nagao & Ôtatume, 1943)
- P. tetragona (Deshayes, 1857) - transferred to †Geloina tetragona (Deshayes, 1857)
- P. triangularis (Dufour, 1881) - transferred to †Geloina triangularis (Dufour, 1881)
- P. viridescens Tapparone Canefri, 1883 - synonymized with Geloina divaricata (Deshayes, 1855)
- P. zeteki Pilsbry, 1931 - synonymized with Polymesoda notabilis (Deshayes, 1855)
- P. zulia H. B. Baker, 1930 - synonymized with Polymesoda notabilis (Deshayes, 1855)
