= Gamja-ongsimi =

Korean dough soup

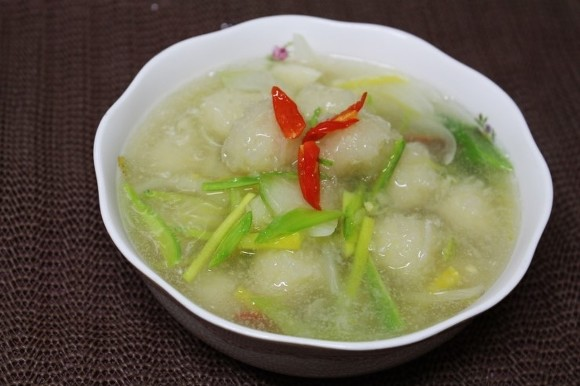
- Type: Sujebi
- Place of origin: Korea
- Region or state: Gangwon Province
- Associated cuisine: Korean cuisine
- Main ingredients: Potatoes

Korean name
- Hangul: 감자옹심이
- RR: gamjaongsimi
- MR: kamjaongsimi
- IPA: kam.dʑa.oŋ.ɕi.mi

Gamja-ongsimi (Korean: 감자옹심이) or potato dough soup is a variety of sujebi (hand-pulled dough soup) in Korea's Gangwon cuisine. Both the potato dumplings (or potato balls) and the soup can be referred to as gamja-ongsimi. The juk (porridge) made with potato balls as its ingredient is called gamja-ongsimi-juk, and the kal-guksu (noodle soup) made with the potato balls is called gamja-ongsimi-kal-guksu.

== Etymology and history ==
Gamja (감자) means potatoes, and ongsimi (옹심이) is a Gangwon dialect word for saealsim (새알심; literally "bird's egg", named for its resemblance to small bird's eggs, possibly quail eggs), which is a type of dough cake ball often made with glutinous rice flour and added to porridges such as patjuk (red bean porridge) and hobak-juk (pumpkin porridge). Originally, gamja-ongsimi was made into small balls as saealsim, but nowadays it is also made into bigger, less globular, and more sujebi (hand-pulled dough)-like shapes.

== Preparation ==
Potatoes are grated, drained, squeezed, and mixed with the potato starch settled at the bottom of drained water in a bowl. The potato dough is balled into ongsimi, and boiled in anchovy-dasima broth with vegetables such as aehobak (Korean zucchini), shiitake mushrooms, shepherd's purse, and red chili peppers. The soup is often topped with gim-garu (seaweed flakes), toasted sesame seeds, and optionally white and yellow al-gomyeong (egg garnish).

== Gallery ==
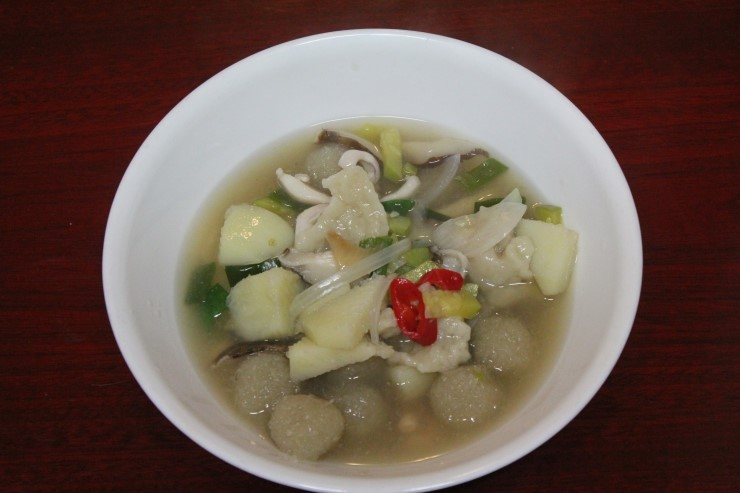
Gamja-ongsimi (potato dumpling soup)

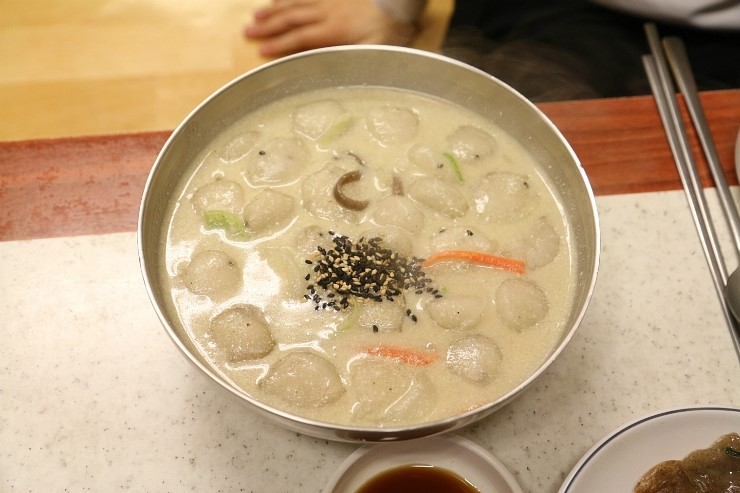
Deulkkae-gamja-ongsimi (potato dumpling soup with perilla seed broth)

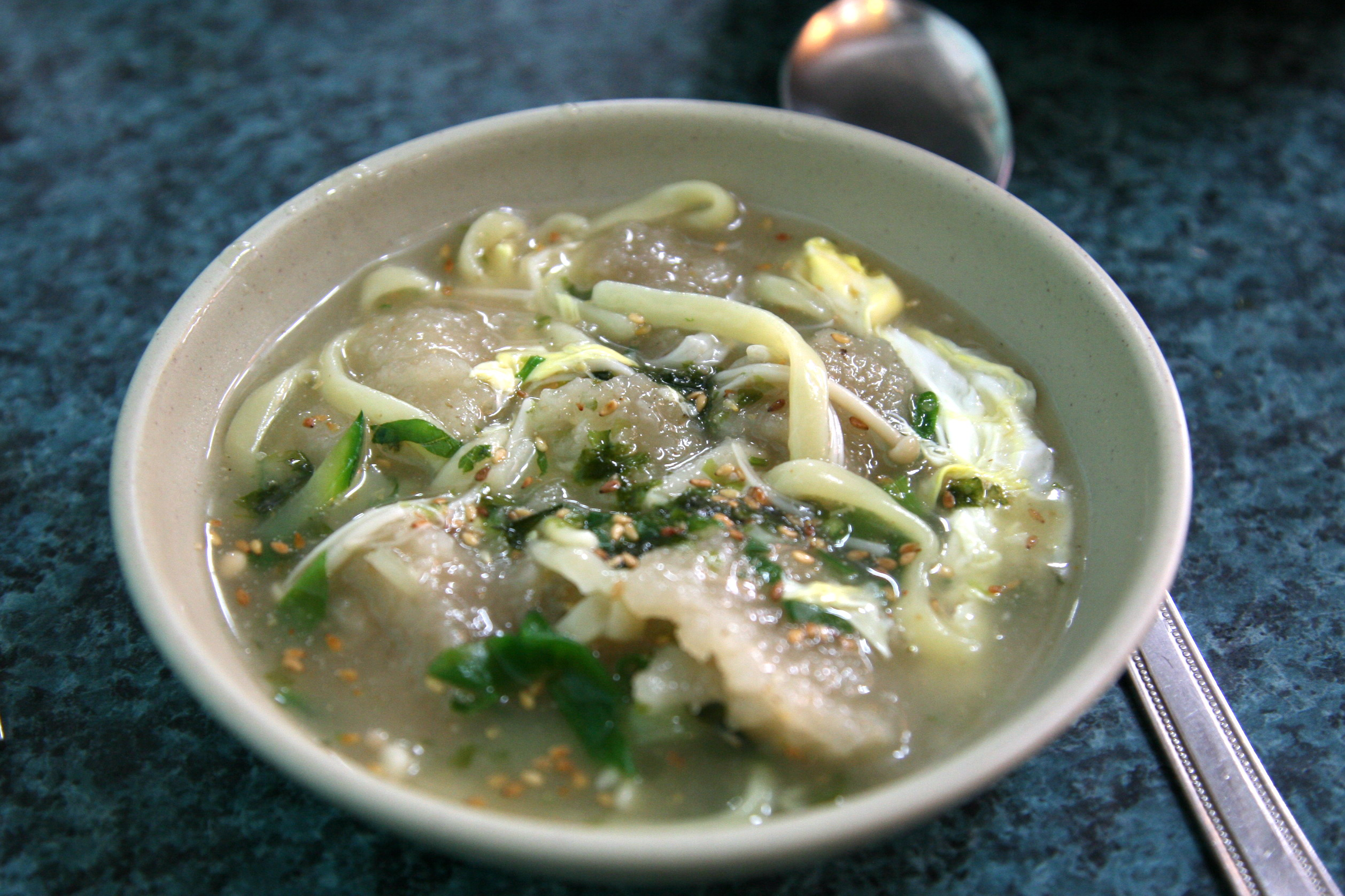
Gamja-ongsimi-kal-guksu (potato dumpling and noodle soup)

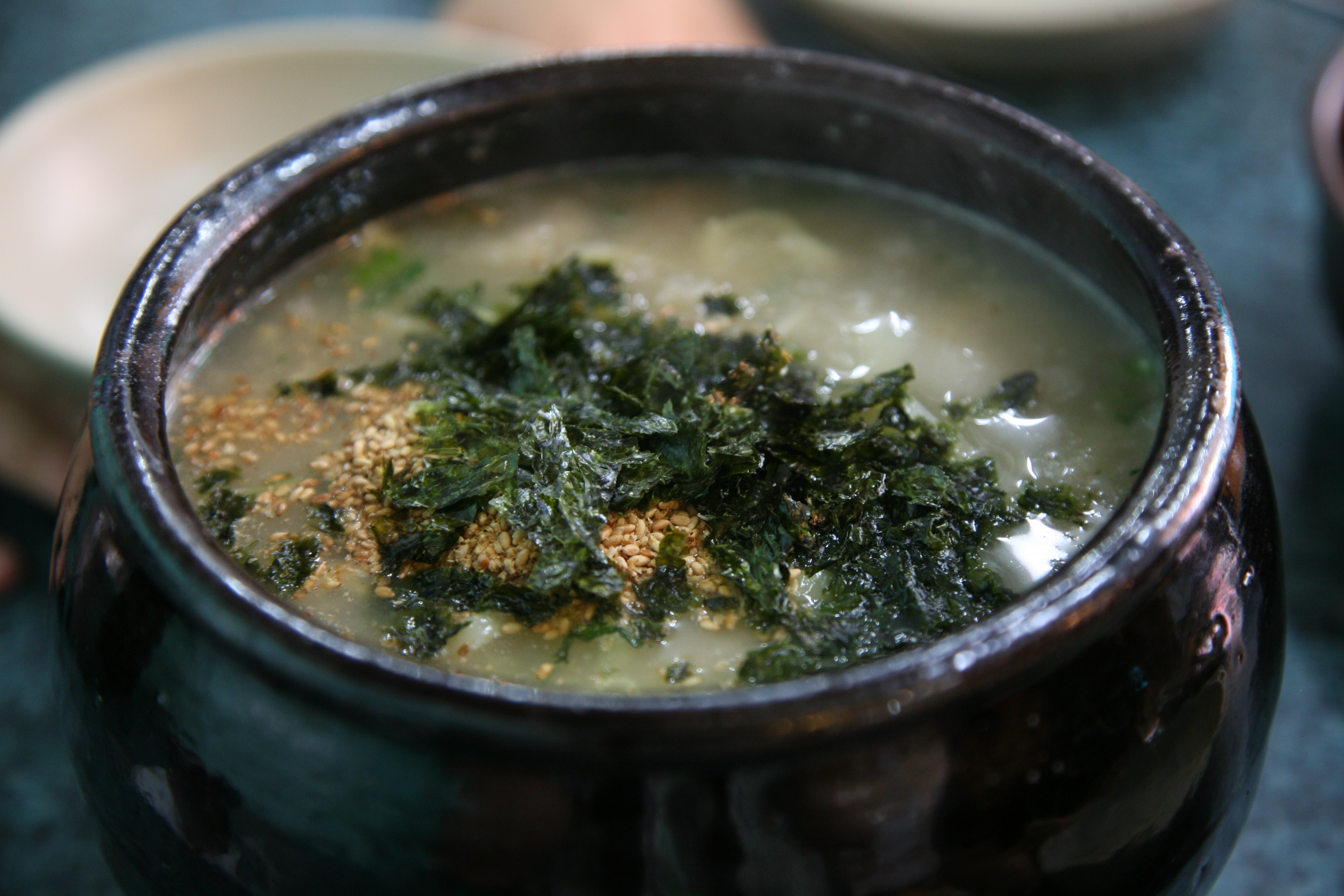
Gamja-ongsimi topped with gim-garu (seaweed flakes) and toasted sesame seeds, served in ttukbaegi (earthenware)

== See also ==
- Kal-guksu
- Silesian dumplings
- List of potato dishes
