= Clam soup =

Soup prepared with clams

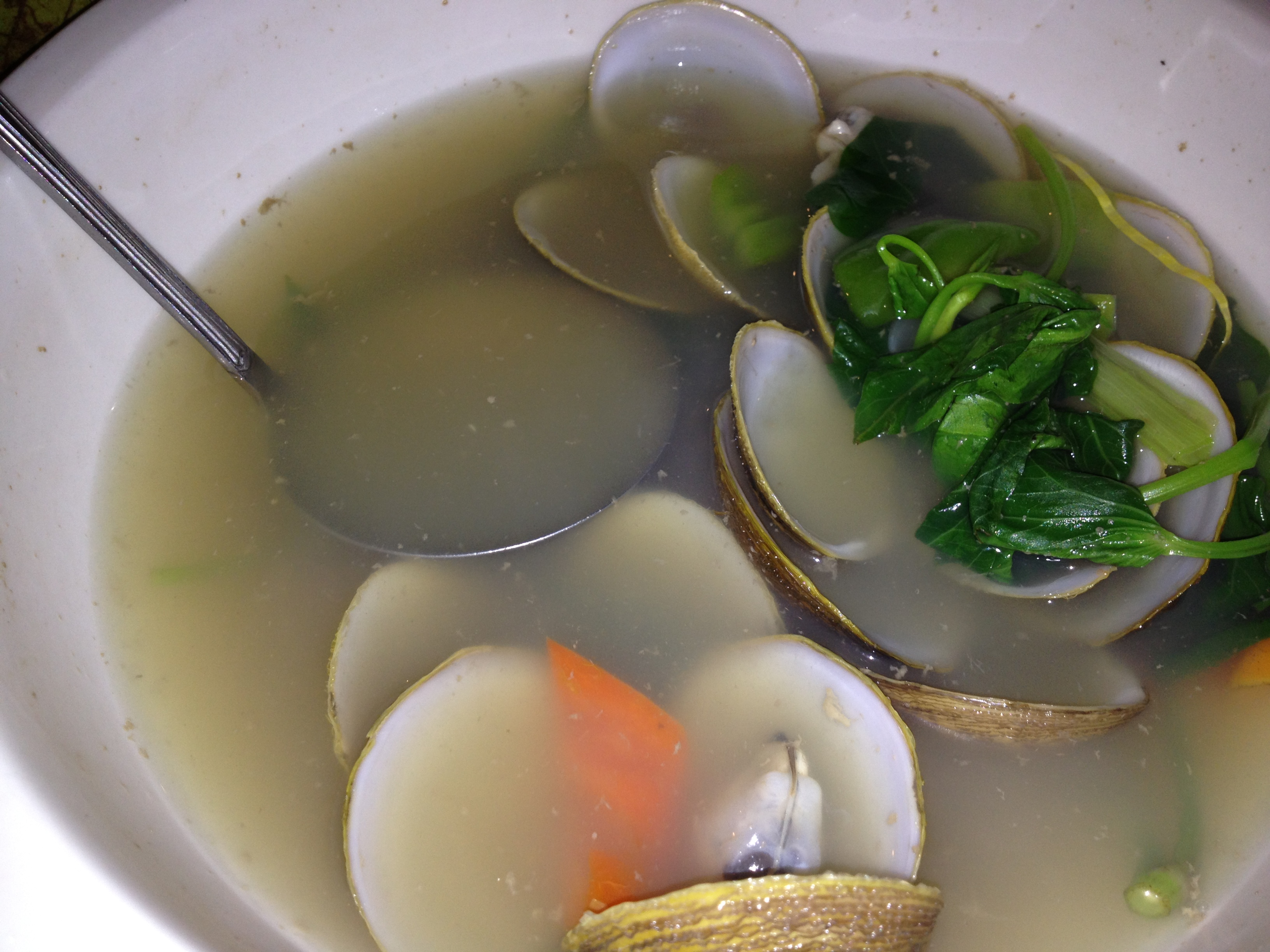
Clam soup

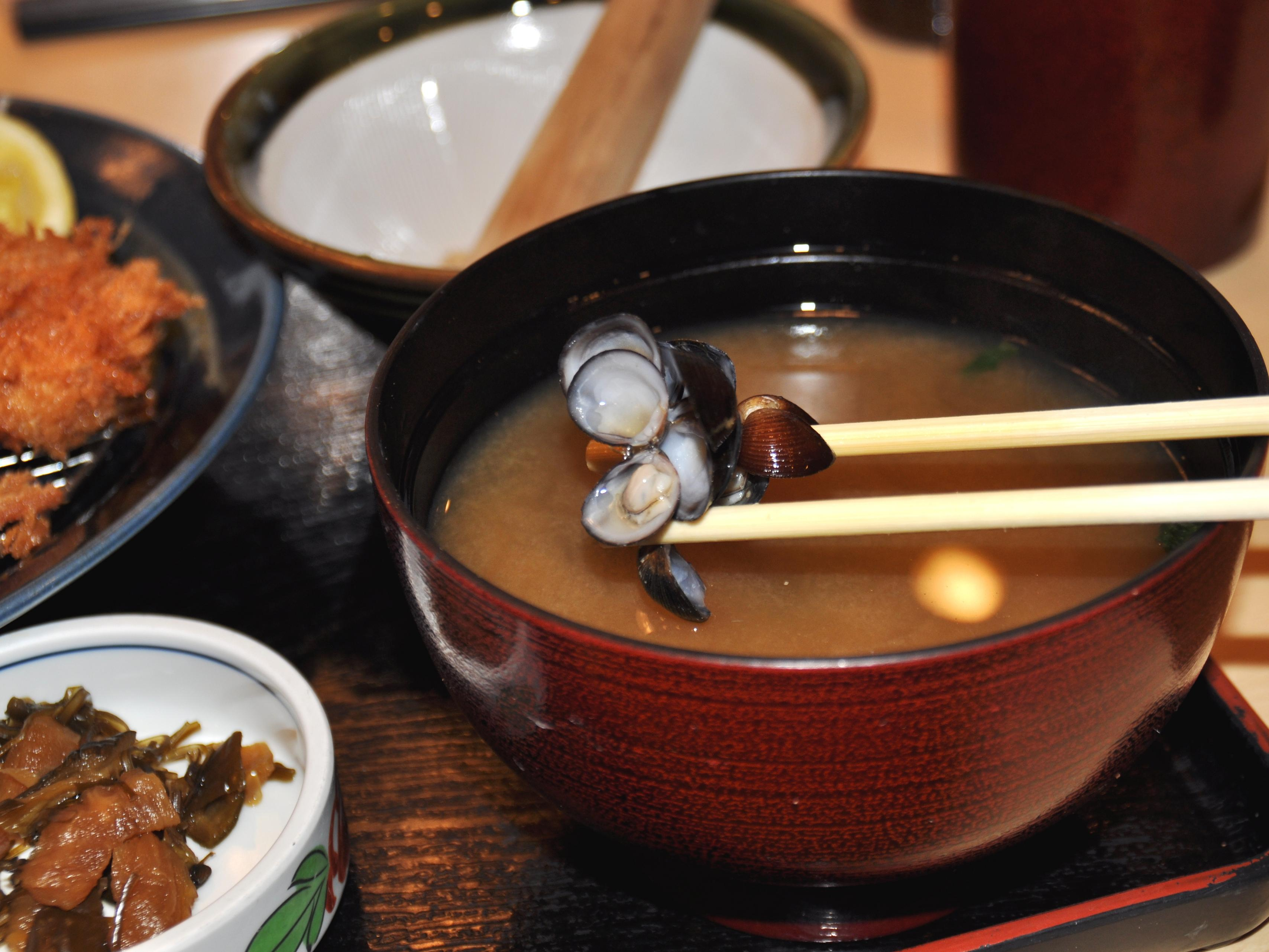
Black clam miso soup at a Tokyo restaurant

Clam soup is a soup prepared using clams as a primary ingredient. Clam soup can be prepared as a thin, broth- or cream/milk-based soup and as a thicker, chowder-style soup. In Japan, hot miso soup prepared with clams is believed by some to be a cure for the hangover.

== Overview ==
Clam soup is prepared using clams as a main ingredient. Additional ingredients can include carrot, celery, onion and other vegetables, vegetable broth or stock or other types of broths and stocks (such as fish stock) seasonings and spices, salt and pepper. Fresh or canned clams can be used to prepare the dish. Clam chowder is a well-known clam soup, but not all clam soups are chowders or have the thick consistency that chowders typically possess.

In Japan, hot miso soup with clams is a traditional hangover cure. Clams possess high levels of ornithine, an amino acid that some Japanese people believe reduces levels of stress, and "helps improve liver function—including detoxifying harmful substances like alcohol." A canned clam soup product named "Power of 70" claims to cure hangovers.

== Varieties ==
=== Clam chowder ===
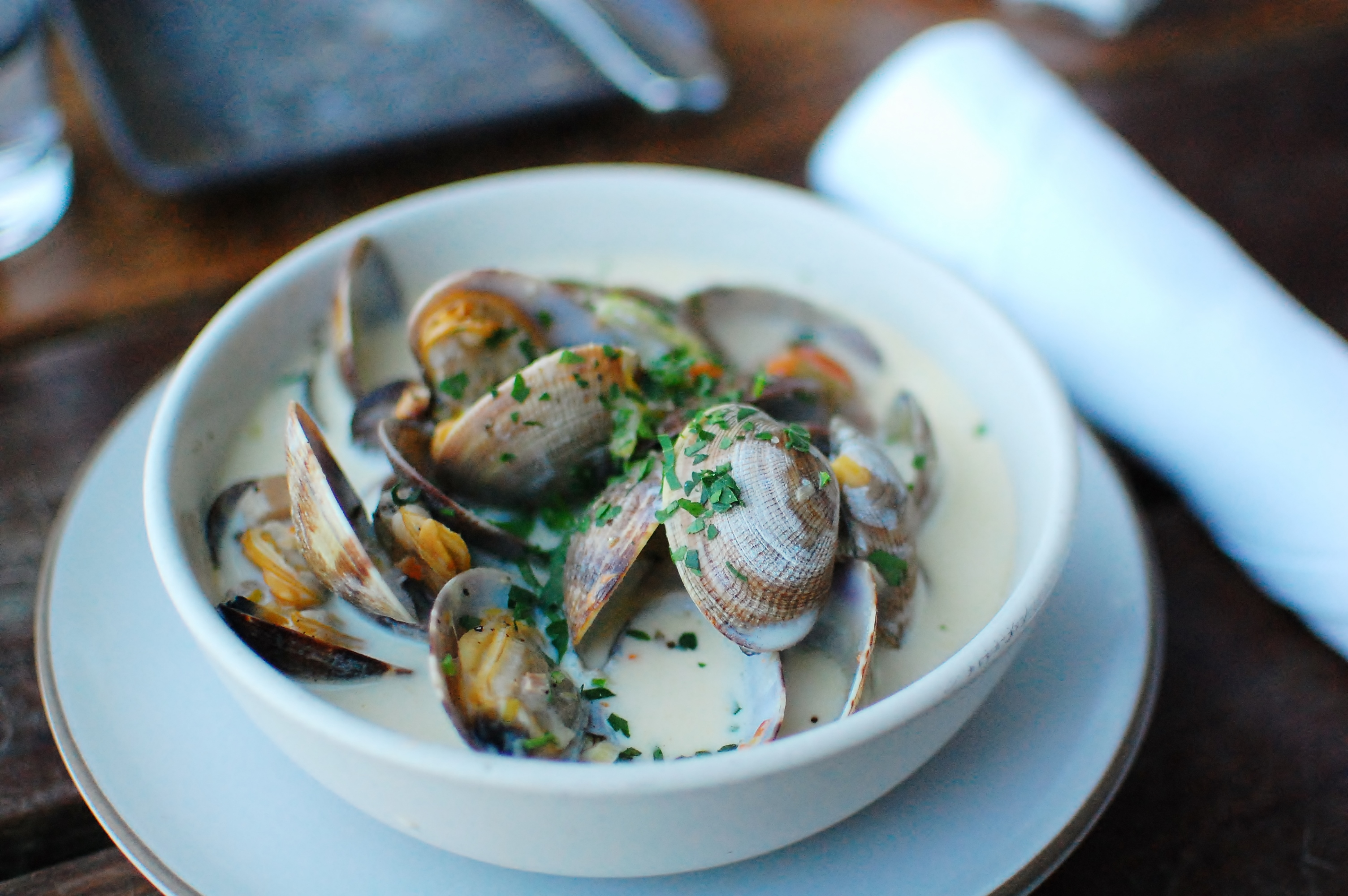
Clam chowder with whole clams

Clam chowder is a clam soup prepared as a chowder, typically using a cream base. Several varieties of clam chowder exist. Manhattan clam chowder is a tomato-based soup prepared with vegetables and clams, but lacking cream or milk.

=== Jaecheop-guk ===
Jaecheop-guk is a clear Korean soup made with small freshwater clams called jaecheop (재첩, Corbicula leana). It is a local specialty of the Gyeongsang Province where jaecheop are harvested, such as the lower reaches of Nakdong River, and river basins around Gimhae, Myeongji, Eumgung, and Hadan counties as well as places near the Suyeong River in Busan and the Seomjin River.

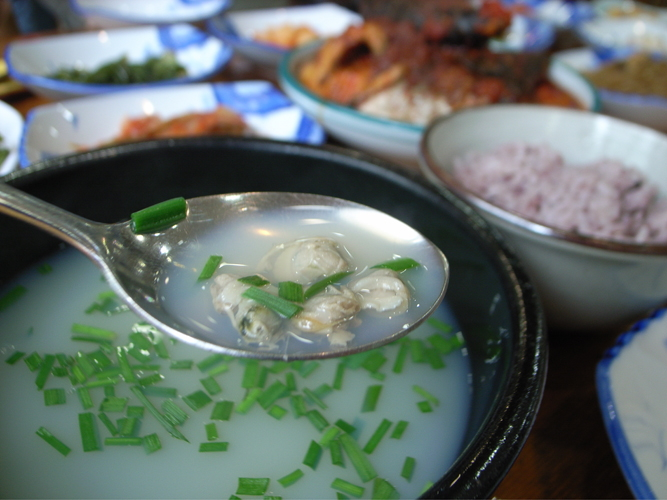
Jaecheop-guk

== Gallery ==
Clam soups

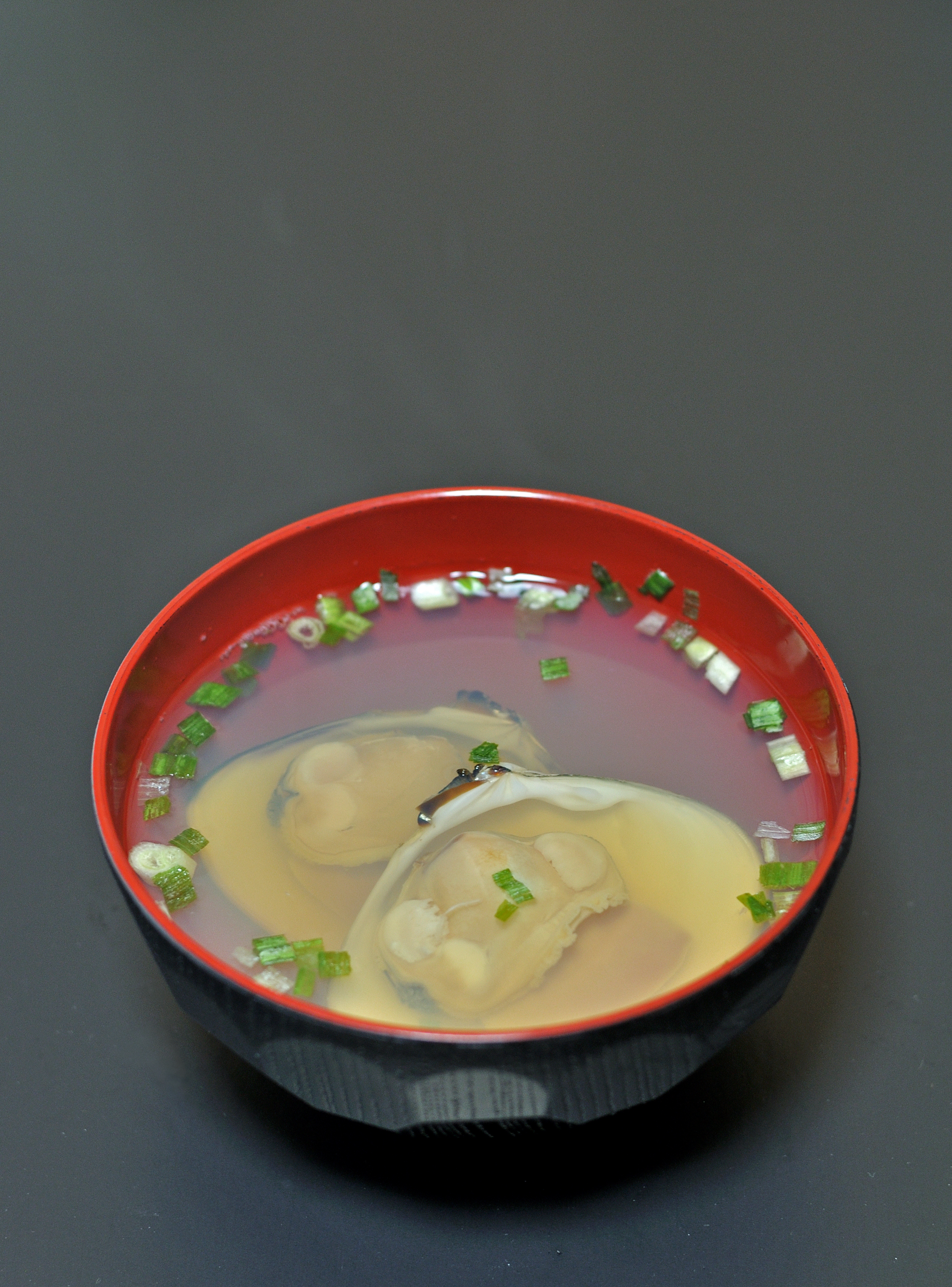
A simple clam soup

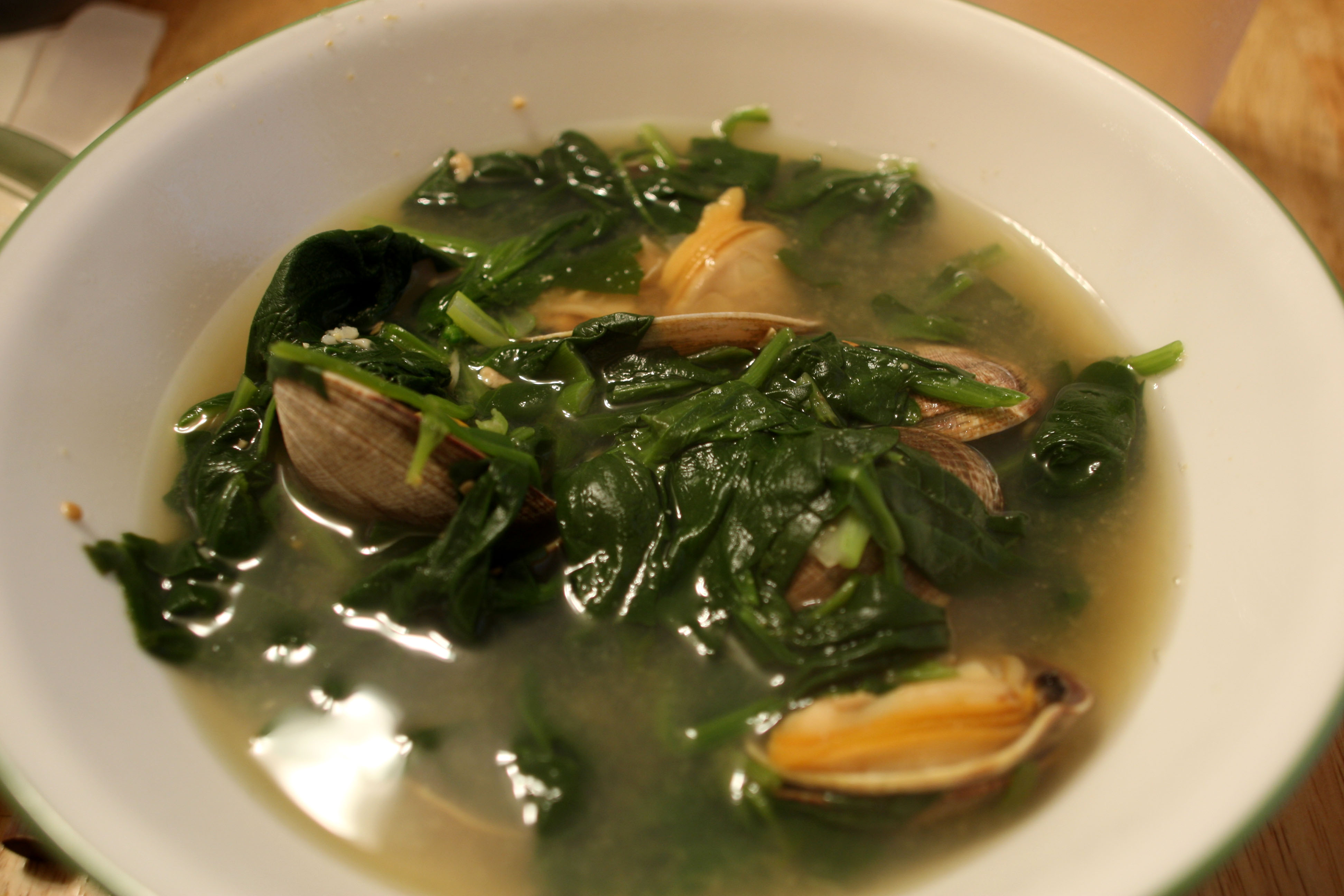
Korean clam soup with spinach

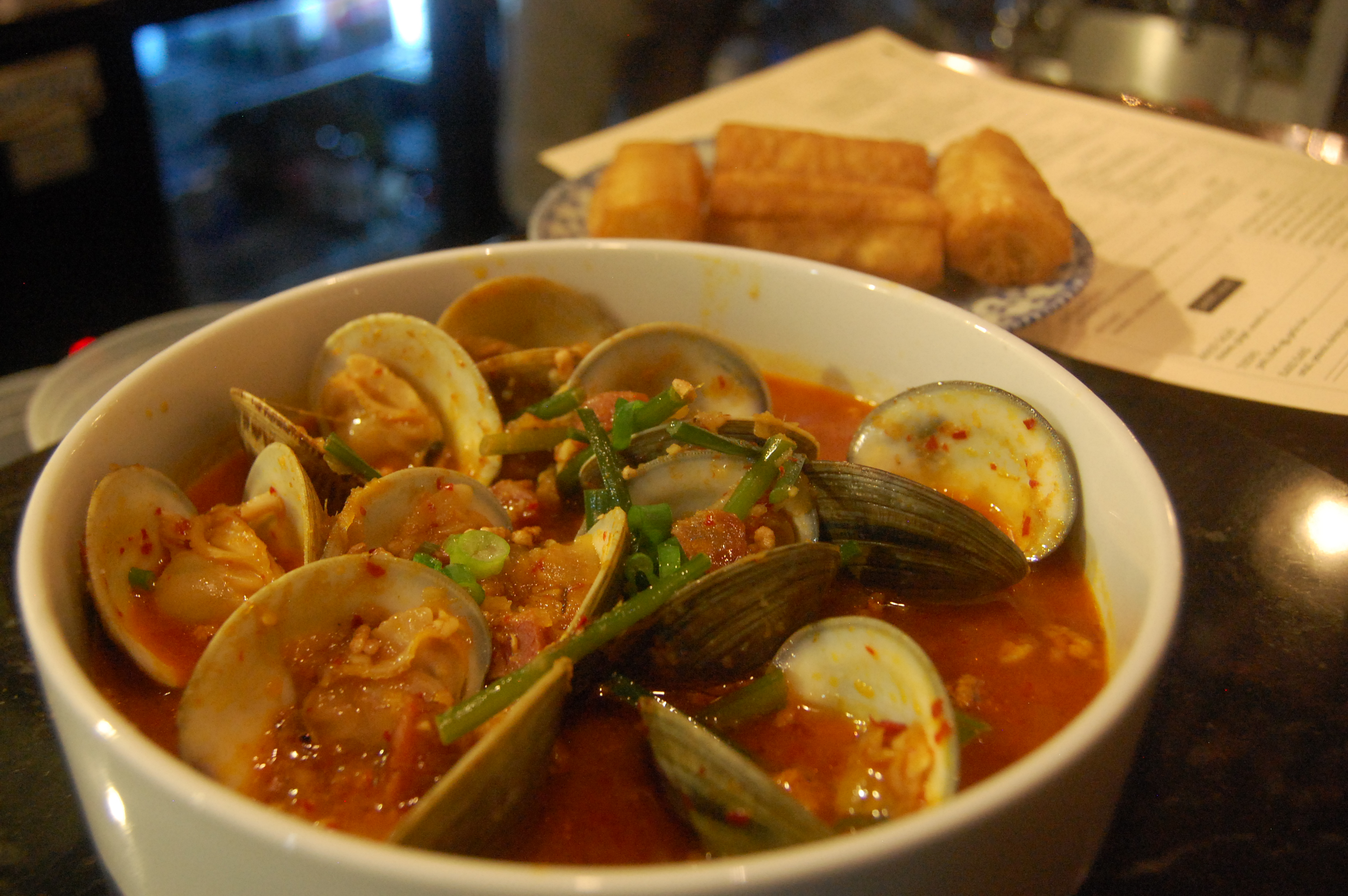
Fresh clam soup

== See also ==
- List of clam dishes
- List of fish and seafood soups
