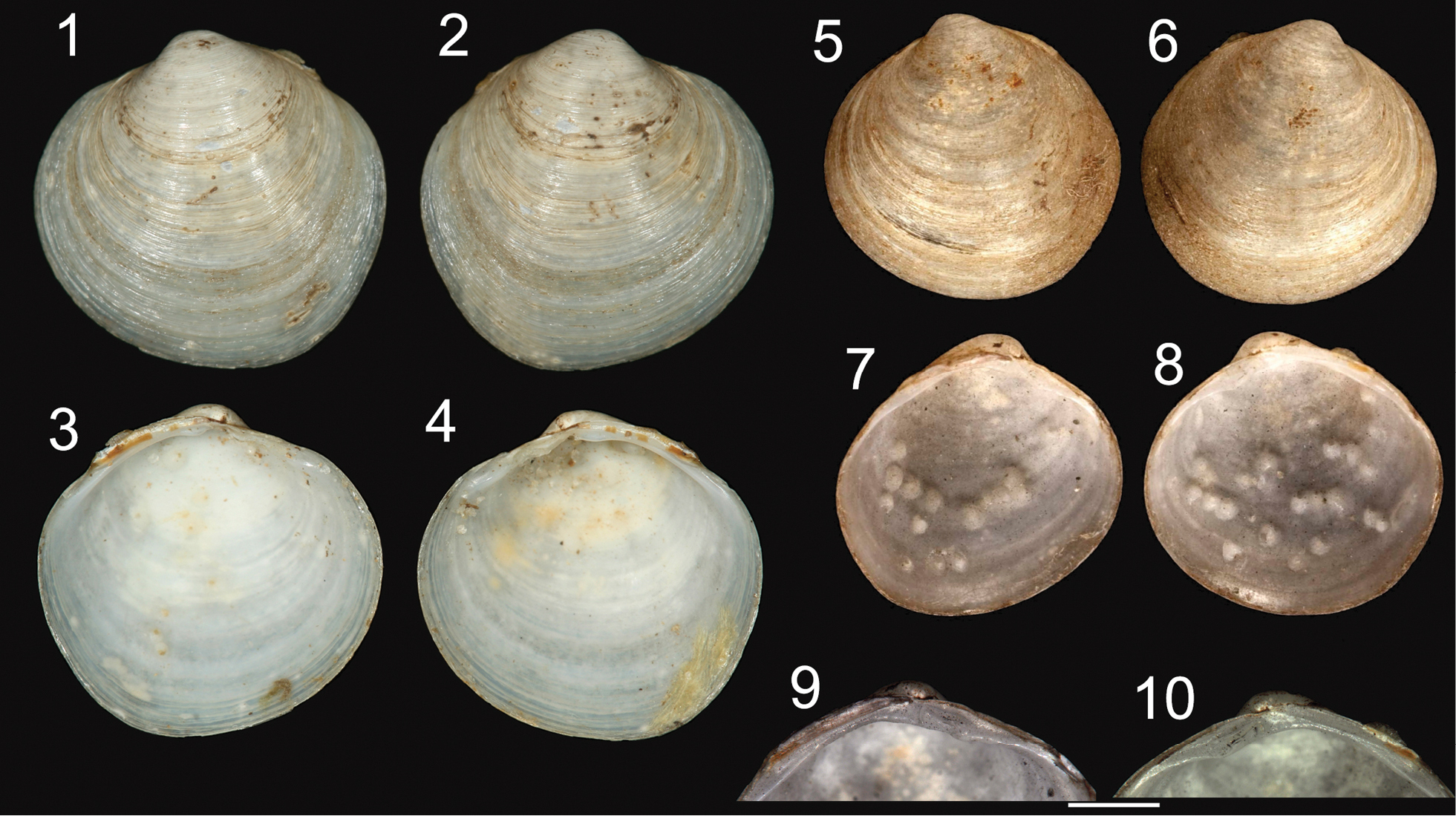
- C. floridana (all)

Scientific classification
- Domain: Eukaryota
- Kingdom: Animalia
- Phylum: Mollusca
- Class: Bivalvia
- Order: Venerida
- Family: Cyrenoididae
- Genus: Cyrenoida; Joannis, 1835

Synonyms
- List: Cyrenella Deshayes, 1836; Cyrenoidea Dall, 1896; Cyrenoides Joannis, 1835 [lapsus]; Sphaerium (Cyrenella) Deshayes, 1836

= Cyrenoida =

Genus of molluscs

Cyrenoida is a genus of bivalves belonging to the family Cyrenoididae. The species of this genus are found in Africa and America.

== Species ==
The following species are recognised in the genus Cyrenoida:

- Cyrenoida americana Morelet, 1851
- Cyrenoida caloosaensis (Dall, 1896)
- Cyrenoida dupontia Joannis, 1835
- Cyrenoida floridana Dall, 1896
- Cyrenoida insula Morrison, 1946
- Cyrenoida panamensis Pilsbry & Zetek, 1931
- Cyrenoida rhodopyga E. von Martens, 1891
