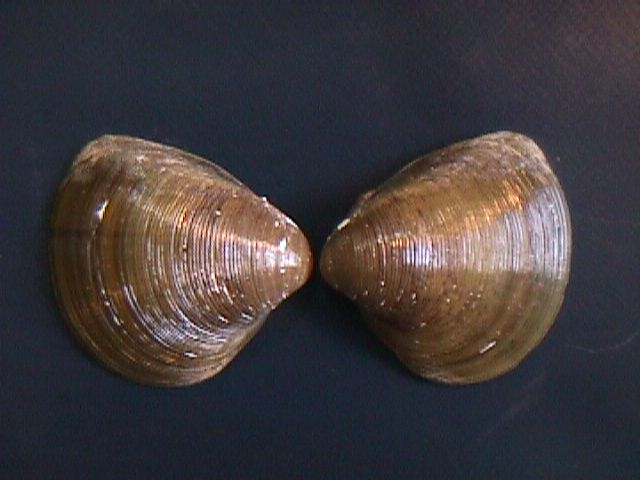
- Polymesoda arctata

Scientific classification
- Domain: Eukaryota
- Kingdom: Animalia
- Phylum: Mollusca
- Class: Bivalvia
- Order: Venerida
- Superfamily: Cyrenoidea
- Family: Cyrenidae
- Genus: Polymesoda; Rafinesque, 1820

Species
- See text.

Synonyms
- List: † Cyprinella Gabb, 1864 (junior subjective synonym); Cyrena (Anomala) Deshayes, 1855; Cyrena (Egeta) H. Adams & A. Adams, 1858; Cyrena (Polymesoda) Rafinesque, 1820; Cyrena (Pseudocyrena) Bourguignat, 1854; † Diodus Gabb, 1869 (junior subjective synonym); Egetaria Mörch, 1861 (junior synonym); Leptosiphon P. Fischer, 1872; Neocyrena Crosse & P. Fischer, 1894; Polymesoda (Egeta) H. Adams & A. Adams, 1858· accepted, alternate representation; Polymesoda (Egetaria) Mörch, 1861· accepted, alternate representation; Polymesoda (Neocyrena) Crosse & P. Fischer, 1894· accepted, alternate representation; Polymesoda (Polymesoda) Rafinesque, 1820· accepted, alternate representation; Polymesoda (Pseudocyrena) Bourguignat, 1854; Pseudocyrena Bourguignat, 1854

= Polymesoda =

Genus of bivalves

Polymesoda is a genus of clams in the family Cyrenidae. The genus was previously classified in the family Corbiculidae, before it was subsumed into Cyrenidae.

== Species ==
The following species are recognised in the genus Polymesoda:

- Polymesoda aequilatera (Deshayes, 1855)
- Polymesoda anomala (Deshayes, 1855)
- Polymesoda arctata (Deshayes, 1855)
- †Polymesoda borealis Kadolsky, 1995
- †Polymesoda bravoensis (Olsson, 1931)
- Polymesoda caroliniana (Bosc, 1801) – Carolina marsh clam
- †Polymesoda convexa (Brongniart, 1822)
- †Polymesoda cordata (J. Morris, 1854)
- †Polymesoda dejaeri Glibert & van de Poel, 1966
- †Polymesoda deperdita (Lamarck, 1806)
- †Polymesoda distorta (Ludwig, 1865)
- †Polymesoda donacina (F. Sandberger, 1861)
- †Polymesoda dulwichiensis (Rickman, 1860)
- Polymesoda exquisita (Prime, 1867)
- Polymesoda floridana (Conrad, 1846)
- Polymesoda fontainei (d'Orbigny, 1842)
- Polymesoda fortis (Prime, 1861)
- Polymesoda inflata (Philippi, 1851)
- †Polymesoda laevis (Lamarck, 1805)
- †Polymesoda langauensis Hölzl, 1957
- Polymesoda meridionalis (Prime, 1865)
- †Polymesoda mermieri (Depéret, 1896)
- Polymesoda mexicana (Broderip & G. B. Sowerby I, 1829)
- †Polymesoda muravchiki Pérez, Genta Iturrería & Griffin, 2010
- Polymesoda neubaueri Coan & Valentich-Scott, 2022
- Polymesoda notabilis (Deshayes, 1855)
- †Polymesoda obovata (J. Sowerby, 1817)
- Polymesoda obscura (Prime, 1860)
- Polymesoda ordinaria (Prime, 1865)
- †Polymesoda pireti (Cossmann, 1908)
- Polymesoda placens (Hanley, 1845)
- Polymesoda radiata (Hanley, 1845)
- †Polymesoda salobris (Ihering, 1907)
- †Polymesoda subarata (Schlotheim, 1820)
- †Polymesoda tegalensis Oostingh, 1935
- †Polymesoda transcaucasica (Kvaliashvili, 1962)
- Polymesoda triangula (Busch in Philippi, 1849)
- Polymesoda tribunalis (Prime, 1870)
- †Polymesoda trigalensis (Olsson, 1931)
- †Polymesoda ulmensis (F. Sandberger, 1872)
- †Polymesoda visenoviensis Kadolsky, 1989

Former species

Many former species of the genus Polymesoda were transferred to the genus Geloina, while others were synonymized or transferred to different genera. For a list of former species see List of former species in the genus Polymesoda.
