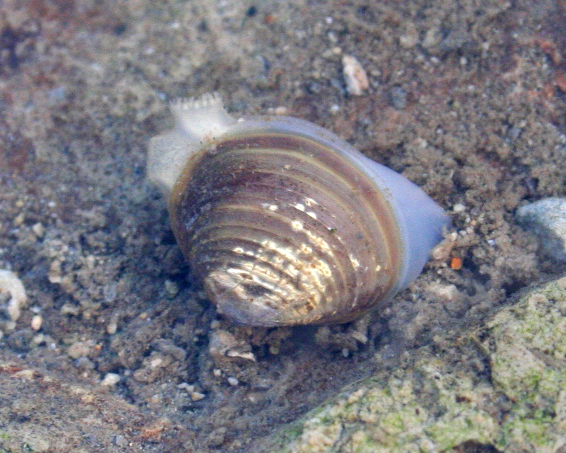
- Corbicula leana
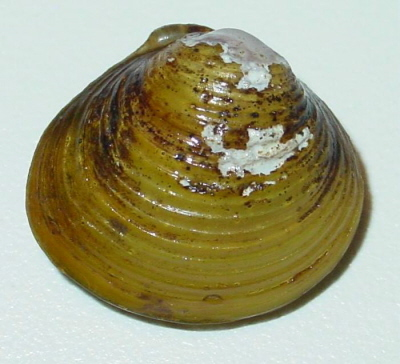
- Shell of Corbicula fluminea

Scientific classification
- Kingdom: Animalia
- Phylum: Mollusca
- Class: Bivalvia
- Order: Venerida
- Superfamily: Cyrenoidea
- Family: Cyrenidae
- Genus: Corbicula; Megerle von Mühlfeld, 1811

Species
- See text.

= Corbicula =

Genus of bivalves

Corbicula is a genus of freshwater and brackish water clams, aquatic bivalve mollusks in the family Cyrenidae, the basket clams. The genus name is the Neo-Latin diminutive of Latin corbis, a basket, referring to the shape and ribs of the shell.

The genus Corbicula includes numerous extant and fossil species; the status of several of them is unclear (species inquirenda). The best known is Corbicula fluminea, originally native to freshwater systems in East Asia, now an invasive species in many areas of the world.

Unusually, some members reproduce via androgenesis, wherein all genes are inherited from the male, one of the very few animals to do so.

In many Asian countries, these clams are used as ingredients for soup. In South Korea, there is popular soup made of these species of clams (usually Corbicula japonica, Corbicula fluminea, Corbicula leana) known as 재첩국 (jaechup-guk).

== Androgenesis ==
Androgenesis occurs rarely in the tree of life, with only a few occurrences documented and multiple mechanisms through which it is achieved. In Corbicula, androgenesis occurs through the ejection of maternal chromosomes from the egg following fertilization by sperm. Fertilization in androgenetic and sexual lineages of Corbicula occurs while the developing egg is arrested at metaphase 1 of meiosis. In sexual species of Corbicula, the axis of the meiotic spindle orienting the duplicated maternal chromosomes is perpendicular to the plasma membrane of the zygote. However, androgenetic lineages of Corbicula have an axis parallel to the membrane. As a result of this unusual orientation, the two maternal polar bodies formed during anaphase 1 are extruded from the zygote, leading to the complete elimination of all maternal chromosomes. Androgenetic Corbicula lineages also have unreduced sperm; therefore, these lineages retain the same ploidy level after maternal chromosome extrusion. Since only maternal chromosomes are eliminated from the zygote, the zygote inherits only the paternal genome. Sperm of sexually reproducing Corbicula are uniflagellate, which is considered the ancestral trait, while androgenetic Corbicula lineages interestingly possess biflagellate sperm.

While androgenesis would likely lead to species extinction in dioecious species, all androgenetic lineages of Corbicula are hermaphroditic, meaning individuals can produce both sperm and egg, and these individuals can self-fertilize to create effectively clonal offspring. Androgenetic lineages of Corbicula are capable of cross-breeding with sexual and other androgenetic lineages in a phenomenon known as “egg parasitism”. This leads to several interesting consequences for determining androgenetic Corbicula phylogeny. The first is a “cytonuclear mismatch” whereby the mitochondrial DNA shows congruence with the parasitized lineage but the genomic DNA is congruent with the selfish androgenetic lineage whose sperm fertilized the egg. Further complicating phylogenetic studies is the rare occurrence of partial or complete nuclear capture, when the maternal DNA is not eliminated from the zygote. Nuclear capture can result in genome recombination or polyploidy. Partial genome capture has been documented when native and androgenetic or multiple androgenetic lineages are sympatric. Egg parasitism has been offered as one explanation for the persistence of androgenetic lineages through increasing allele heterozygosity.

== Taxonomy ==
Despite extensive phylogenetic study of the genus, appropriate categorization of invasive populations has remained a challenge. Lack of clarity in their phylogeny may be due to being hermaphroditic androgens, though no single species of Corbicula has been described as fully androgenetic. Rather, 4-5 specific androgenetic lineages are described in the scientific literature. Form A, B, and D are found within the North America; Form C is in South America; and another form(s) has described in Europe. Cross-breeding between androgenetic and native Corbicula lineages have made it difficult to create a clear taxonomy of the genus, and it is still unclear whether androgenesis arose independently multiple times or originated from a smaller number of lineages that then cross-bred with sexual Corbicula species. A comprehensive molecular phylogenetic study based on the largest DNA sequence dataset assembled for the genus revealed that Corbicula comprises two subgenus-level clades: Corbicula s.s. and Sphaerocorbicula Bolotov, Bespalaya & Aksenova, 2026. The analysis identified at least 27 well-supported species-level clusters. Two new species were described from Myanmar: C. bilini and C. lemroae. Additionally, Sphaerium avanum Theobald, 1874 was transferred to Cyrenidae as Corbicula (Sphaerocorbicula) avana comb. nov., and five nominal species were synonymised.

== Invasiveness ==
Corbicula clams are remarkably proficient invasive species, with native ranges spanning from Australia to Africa, but can now be found in most other continents. In North America, Corbicula may have initially invaded as a human food source, though the origin of invasion in other continents has not been determined. However, genotyping may aid in tracking the number of introductions occurring in non-native habitats.

Part of what contributes to its invasive success is its androgenetic reproductive strategy, wherein a single individual may be capable of creating an entire population, but beyond androgenesis, Corbicula owe their invasive potential to anthropogenic factors and their life history strategies. Corbicula have high reproductive capacities, which may be in part due to their ability to self-fertilize, and the high dispersal potential of their larvae. Corbicula are also phenotypically plastic, which may allow them to outcompete native mussels, and their occurrence at high densities may drive native mussel glochidia mortality. Their high competitive ability is of concern, in part due to the already endangered status of many of the world's mussel species.

Though Corbicula are proficient competitors, they have a small number of lineages, and have worldwide low genetic diversity, which is attributed to their reproductive capabilities. While this generally does not contribute to their success, phenotypic plasticity may buffer them from the effects of low genetic diversity, though it is suggested that population bottlenecks may have occurred during their invasions. Despite the potential for population bottlenecks, there is a need for better control methods, as active spread has occurred. While some eradication methods work, such as deposition of dry ice pellets, the use of a heat torch, and temperature shock, preventative measures are of utmost importance as invasives are often difficult to detect prior to establishment.

== Species ==
Extant species within the genus Corbicula include:

- Corbicula africana (Krauss, 1848)
- Corbicula angulifera E. von Martens, 1897
- Corbicula anomioides (Bogan & Bouchet, 1998)
- Corbicula astartina (E. von Martens, 1860)
- Corbicula aurea Nesemann & G. Sharma, 2007
- Corbicula australis (Deshayes, 1830)
- Corbicula baudoni Morlet, 1886
- Corbicula bitruncata E. von Martens, 1908
- Corbicula blandiana Prime, 1864
- Corbicula bocourti (Morelet, 1865)
- Corbicula cashmiriensis Deshayes, 1855
- Corbicula castanea (Morelet, 1865)
- Corbicula consularis Prime, 1870
- Corbicula cyreniformis Prime, 1860
- Corbicula dautzenbergi Prashad, 1928
- Corbicula elatior E. von Martens, 1905
- Corbicula elongata Clessin, 1878
- Corbicula erosa Prime, 1861
- Corbicula ferghanensis Kursalova & Starobogatov, 1971
- Corbicula fluminalis (O. F. Müller, 1774)
- Corbicula fluminea (O. F. Müller, 1774) – Asian clam
- Corbicula formosana Dall, 1903
- Corbicula gabonensis Preston, 1909
- Corbicula gustaviana E. von Martens, 1900
- Corbicula iravadica Blanford, 1880
- Corbicula japonica Prime, 1864
- Corbicula javanica (Mousson, 1849)
- Corbicula lamarckiana Prime, 1864
- Corbicula largillierti (Philippi, 1844)
- Corbicula larnaudieri Prime, 1862
- Corbicula leana (Prime, 1864)
- Corbicula leviuscula Prime, 1864
- Corbicula loehensis Kruimel, 1913
- Corbicula lutea Morelet, 1862
- Corbicula lydigiana Prime, 1861
- Corbicula madagascariensis Smith, 1882
- Corbicula mahalonensis Kruimel, 1913
- Corbicula malaccensis Deshayes, 1855
- Corbicula manilensis (Philippi, 1844)
- Corbicula maroubra (Iredale, 1943)
- Corbicula masapensis Kruimel, 1913
- Corbicula matannensis Sarasin & Sarasin, 1898
- Corbicula messageri Bavay & Dautzenberg, 1901
- Corbicula moltkiana Prime, 1878
- Corbicula moreletiana Prime, 1867
- Corbicula mortoni M. Huber, 2015
- Corbicula nitens (Philippi, 1844)
- Corbicula noetlingi E. von Martens, 1899
- Corbicula ovalina Deshayes, 1855
- Corbicula poppei Thach & F. Huber, 2021
- Corbicula possoensis Sarasin & Sarasin, 1898
- Corbicula pulchella (Mousson, 1849)
- Corbicula pullata (Philippi, 1850)
- Corbicula rectipatula B.-Y. Huang, 1981
- Corbicula regia Clessin, 1879
- Corbicula rivalis (Philippi, 1850)
- Corbicula sandai Reinchardt, 1878
- Corbicula senegalensis Clessin, 1877
- Corbicula siamensis Prashad, 1928
- Corbicula similis (W. Wood, 1828)
- Corbicula solida Clessin, 1887
- Corbicula solidula Prime, 1861
- Corbicula straminea Reinhardt, 1877
- Corbicula striatella Deshayes, 1855
- Corbicula subnitens Clessin, 1887
- Corbicula subplanata E. von Martens, 1897
- Corbicula tenuis Clessin, 1887
- Corbicula tibetensis Prashad, 1929
- Corbicula tobae E. von Martens, 1900
- Corbicula towutensis Kruimel, 1913
- Corbicula tsadiana E. von Martens, 1903
- Corbicula virescens Brandt, 1974
