= Sujebi =

Korean pasta soup

Sujebi / ttŭdŏguk
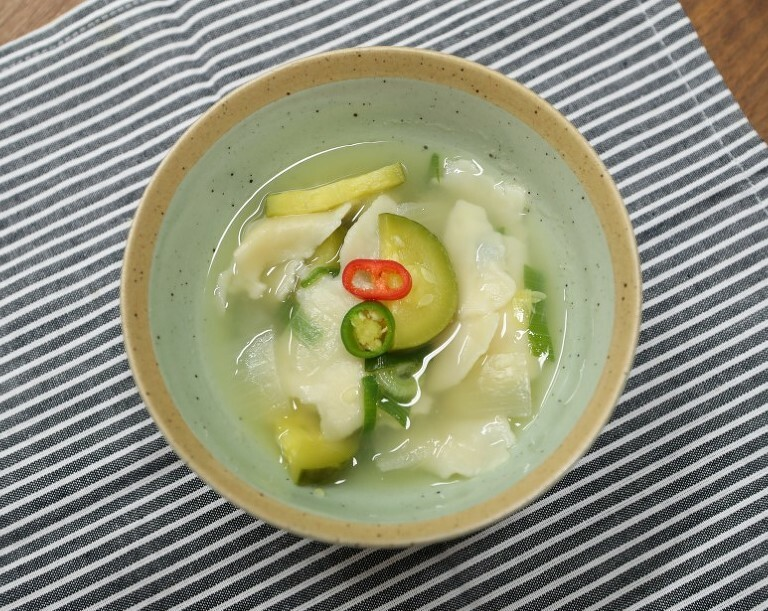
- Alternative names: Hand-pulled dough soup
- Place of origin: Korea

South Korean name
- Hangul: 수제비
- RR: sujebi
- MR: sujebi
- IPA: [su.dʑe.bi]

North Korean name
- Hangul: 뜨더국
- RR: tteudeoguk
- MR: ttŭdŏguk
- IPA: [t͈ɯ.dʌ.ɡuk̚]

Sujebi (수제비; South Korean name), ttŭdŏguk (뜨더국; North Korean name), or hand-pulled dough soup, or Korean-style pasta soup, is a Korean traditional soup consisting of dough flakes roughly torn by hand, with various vegetables. The flavor and recipe resemble kalguksu, except that the latter is made with noodles rather than wheat flakes. It is commonly considered a dish to consume on rainy days, along with bindaetteok.

The broth for sujebi is usually made with dried anchovies, shellfish, and kelp. In order to obtain a rich, umami flavor, the ingredients should be simmered for many hours. Added to this broth are soft noodles and various vegetables or kimchi, most often zucchini and potatoes.

== Origin ==
Korean people began to eat sujebi and guksu (국수 noodles), both dishes made of wheat flour, from the early Goryeo period (935~1392), but the name sujebi (earlier sujeop-eo) dates from the mid Joseon period. Sujeop-eo is a combined hanja word comprising the terms su (hanja: 手; hangul: 수; literally "hand") and jeop (hanja: 摺; hangul: 접어 or 접다; literally "folded" or "folding").

From the Joseon period, people started making various types of sujeobi according to various purposes. Sujebi is today considered a typical commoner's food, but in the past, it was relatively rare and used for special occasions especially janchi (잔치; feast, banquet) such as dol janchi (the celebration of a baby's first birthday).

In North Korea, sujebi is called milgaruttŭdŏguk (밀가루뜨더국), which is the words comprising three words: milgaru (밀가루; literally "wheat flour") + ttŭdŏ (뜯어; literally "tearing" or "torn") + guk (국; literally "soup").

The names of sujebi vary according to regions in Korea.

Region or cities	Name	Korean name
North Korea	milgaruttŭdŏguk	밀가루뜨더국
Gyeonggi Province and Gangwon Province	tteudegi; tteudeokguk	뜨데기 or 뜨덕국
South Jeolla Province	tteoneonjuk; ttiyeonjuk	떠넌죽 or 띠연죽
South Gyeongsang Province	sujibi; miljebi; milkkarijangguk	수지비, 밀제비, or 밀까리장국
Yeocheon and Bongwha	dabureongjuk; beongeuraegi	다부렁죽 or 벙으래기

== Gallery ==
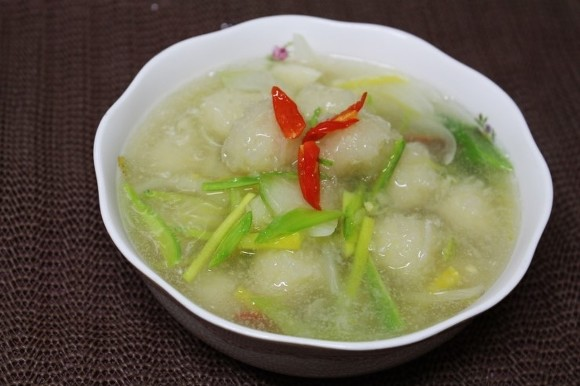
Gamja-ongsimi

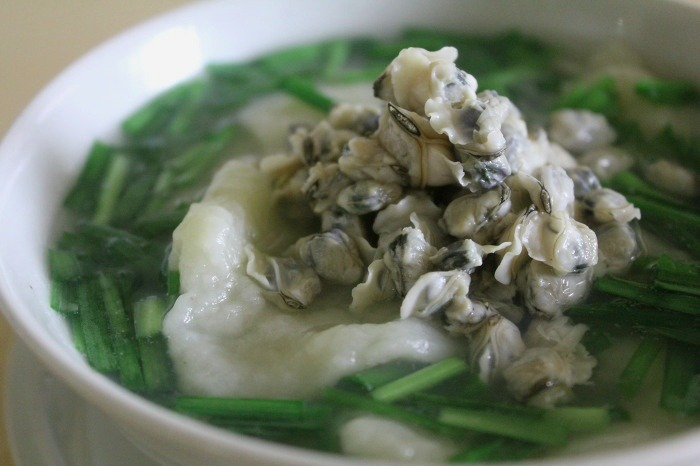
Jaecheop-sujebi

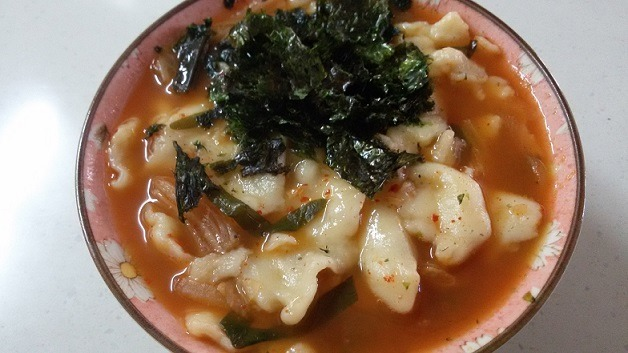
Kimchi-sujebi

== See also ==
- Maltagliati
- Korean noodles
