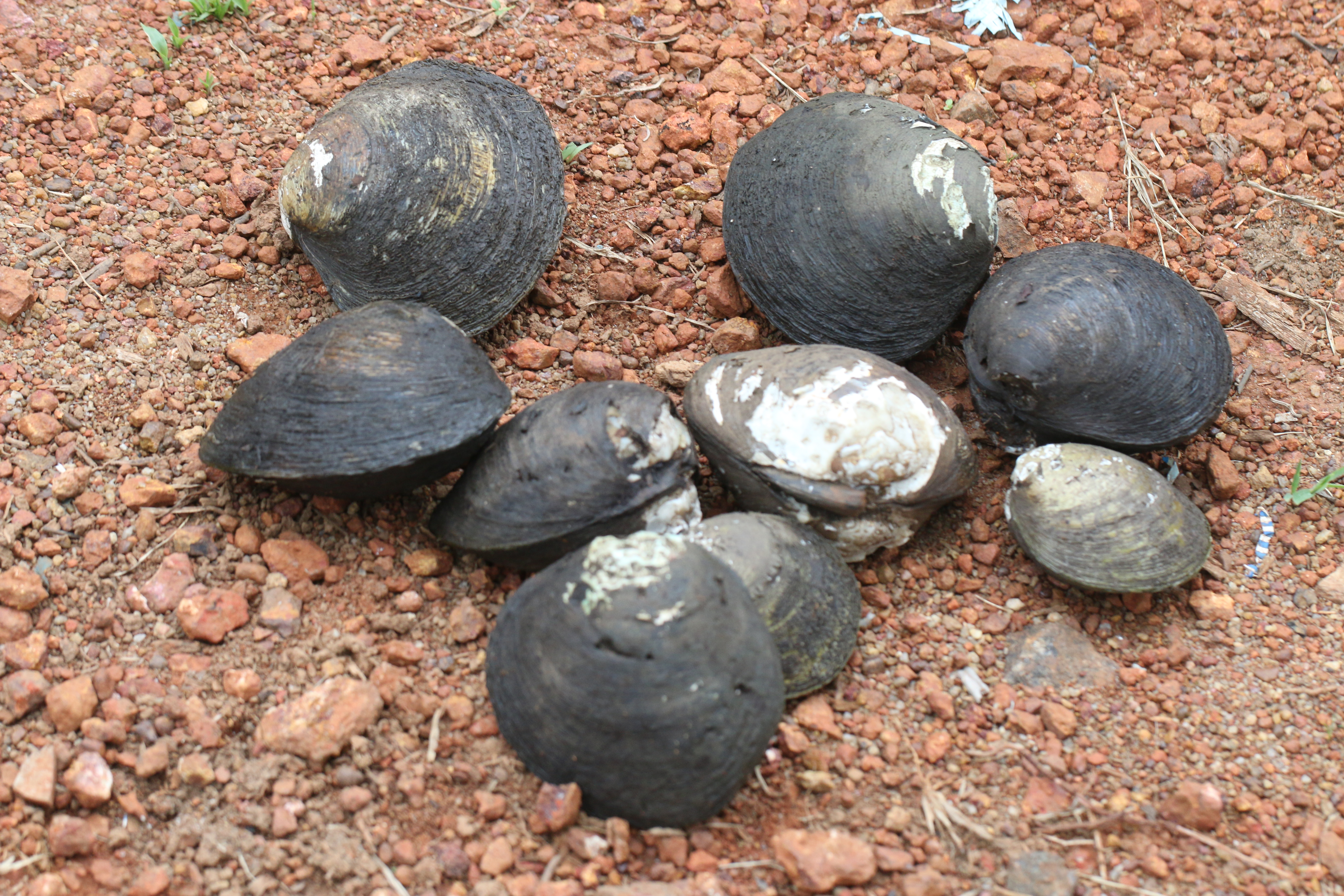
- Geloina sp.

Scientific classification
- Kingdom: Animalia
- Phylum: Mollusca
- Class: Bivalvia
- Order: Venerida
- Superfamily: Cyrenoidea
- Family: Cyrenoididae; H. and A. Adams, 1857

Genera
- See text.

Synonyms
- Cyrenellidae Gray, 1853; Geloinidae Prashad, 1932

= Cyrenoididae =

Family of bivalves

Cyrenoididae is a taxonomic family of saltwater clams, marine bivalve mollusks in the superfamily Cyrenoidea.

== Genera ==
The following genera are recognised in the family Cyrenoididae:

- Cyanocyclas Blainville, 1818
- Cyrenoida de Joannis, 1835 (syn. Cyrenella Deshayes, 1836)
- Geloina J. E. Gray, 1842
- Polymesoda Rafinesque, 1820
