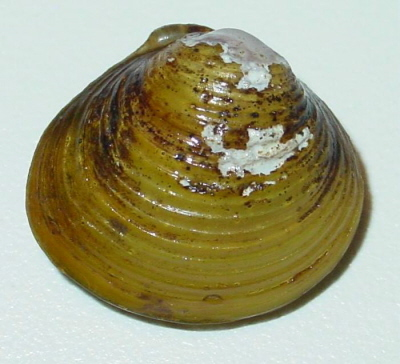
- Shell of Corbicula fluminea

Scientific classification
- Kingdom: Animalia
- Phylum: Mollusca
- Class: Bivalvia
- Order: Venerida
- Superfamily: Cyrenoidea
- Family: Cyrenidae; Gray, 1847

Genera
- See text.

Synonyms
- Corbiculidae Gray, 1847; Geloinidae Iredale, 1943; Polymesodinae Habe, 1977

= Cyrenidae =

Family of bivalves

Cyrenidae is a family of clams in the order Venerida.

== Genera ==
Genera within this family include:

- Batissa Gray, 1853
- Corbicula Megerle von Mühlfeld, 1811
- Cyanocyclas Blainville, 1818
- Geloina Gray, 1842
- Polymesoda Rafinesque, 1820
- Villorita Gray, 1833

Taxa brought into synonymy

- †Cyrenida: synonym of Corbicula Megerle von Mühlfeld, 1811
- Subfamily Polymesodinae Habe, 1977: synonym of Cyrenidae Gray, 1847

Note
The species formerly known as Sphaerium avanum Theobald, 1874 has been transferred to the genus Corbicula as Corbicula (Sphaerocorbicula) avana comb. nov., confirming its placement in Cyrenidae rather than Sphaeriidae.
