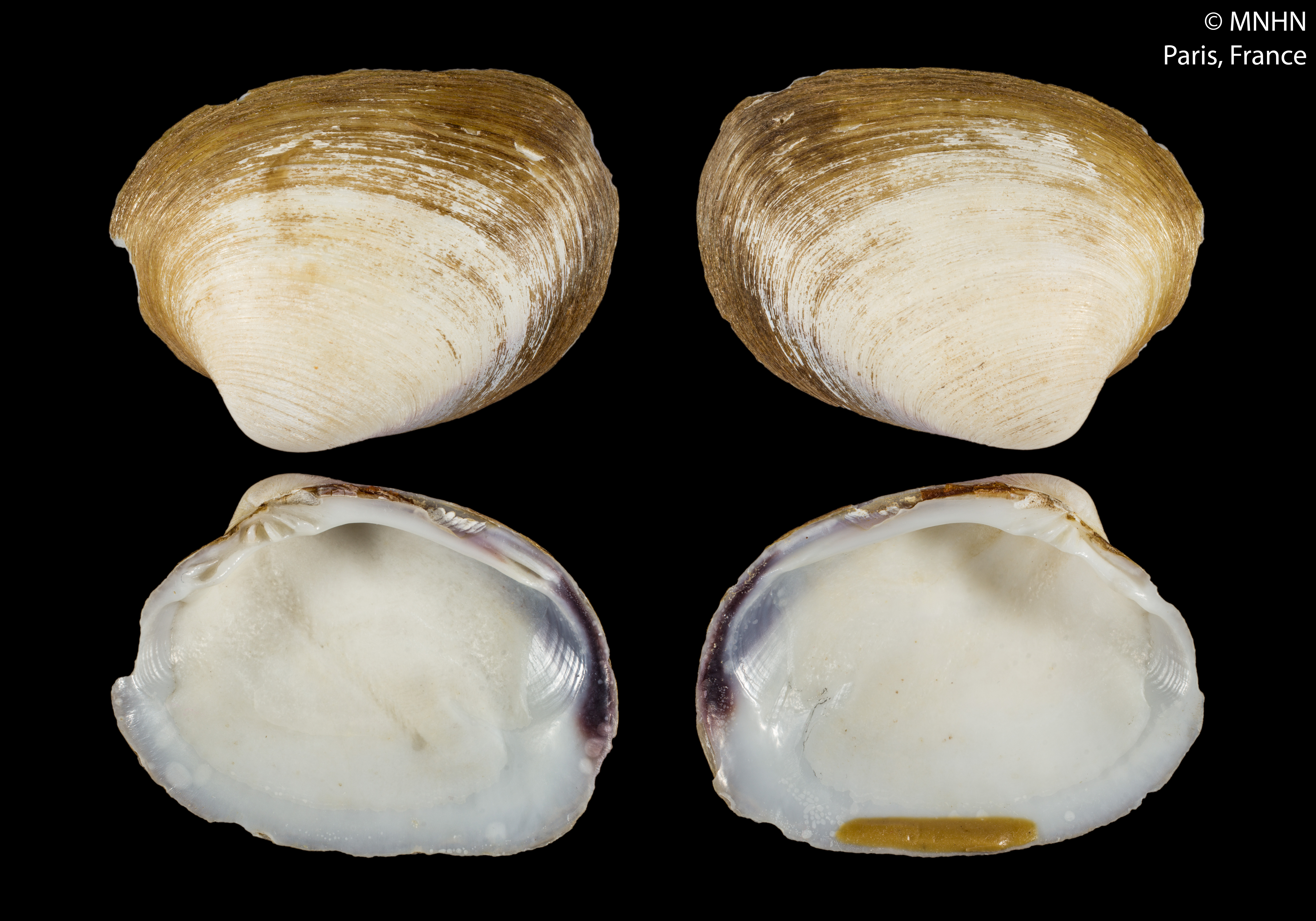
- Polymesoda notabilis

Scientific classification
- Kingdom: Animalia
- Phylum: Mollusca
- Class: Bivalvia
- Order: Venerida
- Superfamily: Cyrenoidea; J. E. Gray, 1840

Families
- See text

Synonyms
- Corbiculoidea J. E. Gray, 1847; Cyrenoidoidea H. Adams & A. Adams, 1857 (1853)

= Cyrenoidea =

Superfamily of freshwater bivalves

Cyrenoidea is a superfamily of freshwater bivalves in the order Venerida.

== Description ==
There are approximately 60 or more living species of the superfamily, which can be found in marine, brackish, and freshwater environments.

== Taxonomy ==
The following families are recognised in the superfamily Cyrenoidea:

- Cyrenidae J. E. Gray, 1840
- Cyrenoididae H. Adams & A. Adams, 1857 (1853)
- Glauconomidae J. E. Gray, 1853
