= Duck soup =

Duck Soup is a 1933 film starring the Marx Brothers.

Duck soup or Duck Soup may also refer to:

- Duck Soup (1927 film), featuring Laurel and Hardy
- Oritang, Korean duck soup
- "Duck Soup", episode of Even Stevens
- "Duck Soup", song by Baba Brooks

== See also ==
- Czernina, Polish duck blood soup
- Duck soup noodles, Malaysian
- Duck Soup to Nuts, 1944 Warner Bros. animated short
- "Duct Soup", 1997 episode of the television series Red Dwarf
- Noble (company), production studio whose previous names include "Duck Soup Producktions" and "Duck Soup Studios"
