= List of Korean dishes =

Below is a list of dishes found in Korean cuisine.

== Staples ==
=== Rice dishes ===
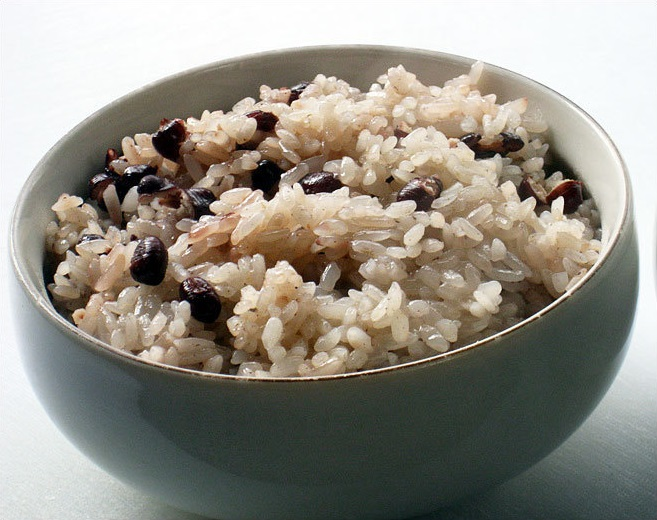
Patbap

- Bibimbap (비빔밥, "mixed rice"): rice topped with seasoned vegetables such as spinach, mushrooms, sea tangle, carrots, bean sprouts, and served with gochujang (red pepper paste). Some variations include beef or egg. All of the toppings are stirred together in one large bowl and eaten with a spoon.
- Bokkeum-bap (볶음밥): stir-fried bap.
- Boribap (보리밥): Barley cooked rice.
- Deopbap (덮밥: 'topped rice'): cooked rice topped with something that can be served as a side dish (e.g. hoedeopbap is topped with hoe.)
- Dolsot bibimbap (돌솥 비빔밥): served in a heated stone bowl, allowing the dish to continue cooking after it is served. Raw egg is added to cook against the sides of the bowl.
- Gimbap (seaweed rice, 김밥)
- Gukbap (국밥): a dish with cooked rice added to hot soup or boiling rice in soup.
- Hoedeopbap (회덮밥): uses a variety of cubed raw fish.
- Jumeok-bap (주먹밥): lump of cooked rice with add-ins, common street food or snack.
- Kimchi bokkeumbap (김치볶음밥): kimchi fried rice with typically chopped vegetables and meats.
- Kongbap (콩밥): rice with soy beans.
- Kongnamulbap (콩나물밥): rice with bean sprouts, kongnamul, and sometimes pork.
- Nurungji (누룽지): The crisp thin layer of rice left on the bottom of the pot when cooking rice, which is eaten as a snack or can be made as a porridge.
- Ogokbap (오곡밥: five-grain rice): A mixture of rice, red beans, black beans, millet, and sorghum, but can vary with glutinous rice and other grains.
- Patbap (팥밥): rice with red beans.
- Ssambap (쌈밥): a dish where one food is wrapped in another (Ssam), including rice.
- Yakbap (약밥): steamed glutinous rice mixed with chestnuts, jujubes, and pine nuts.
- Yukhoe bibimbap (육회비빔밥): raw beef strips with raw egg and a mixture of soy sauce with Asian pear and gochujang.
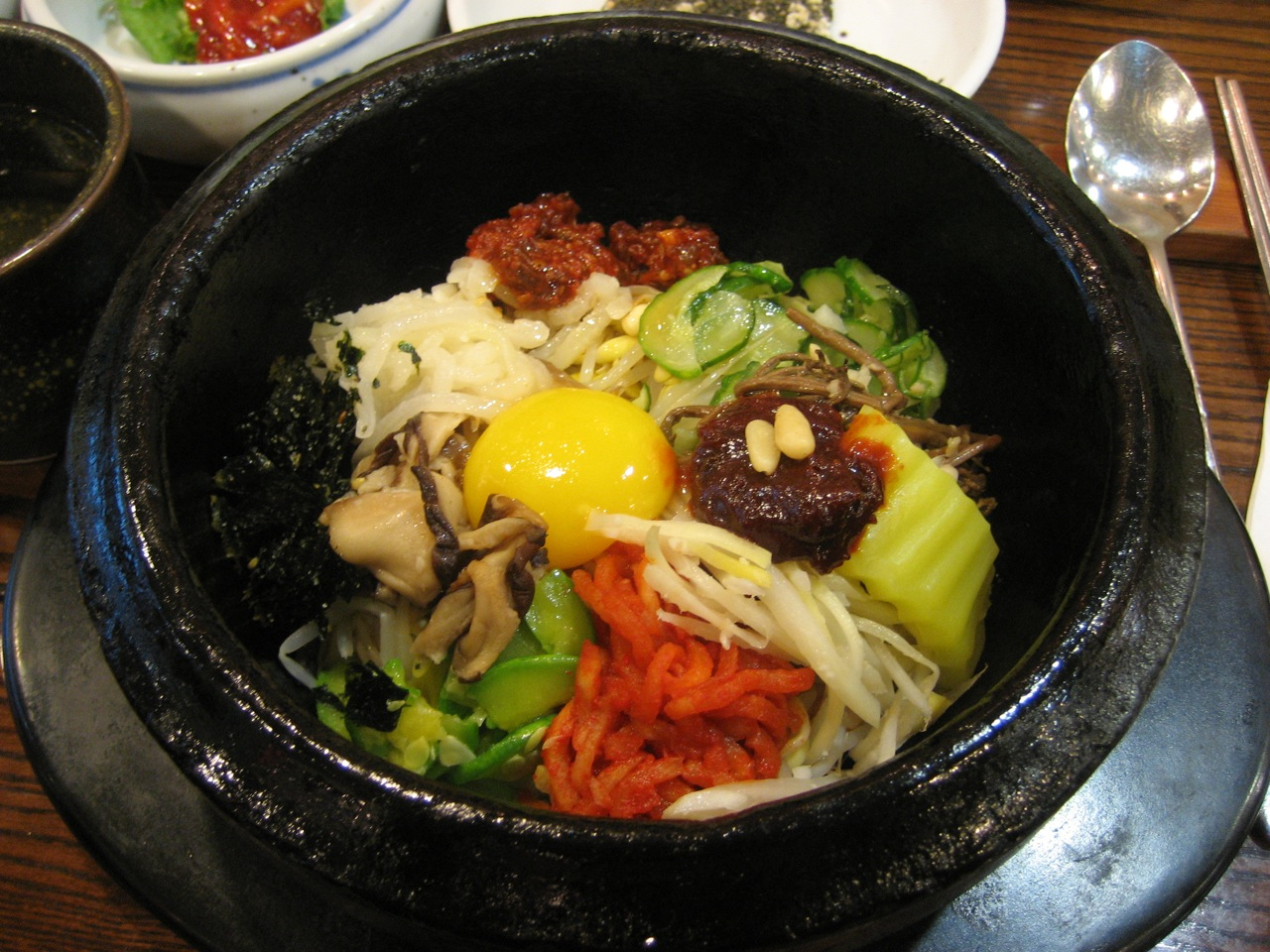
Dolsot bibimbap

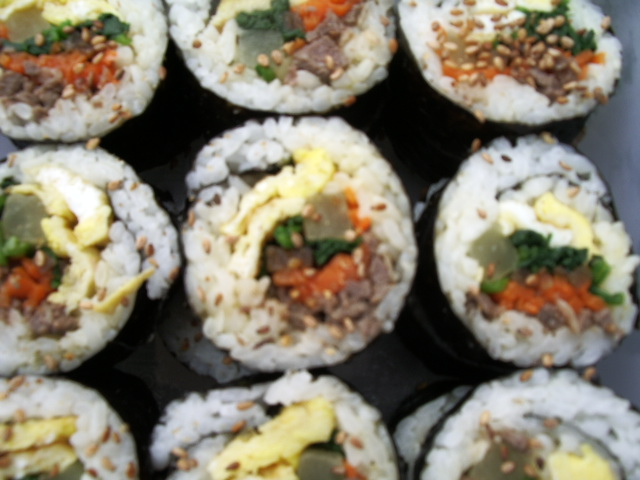
Gimbap

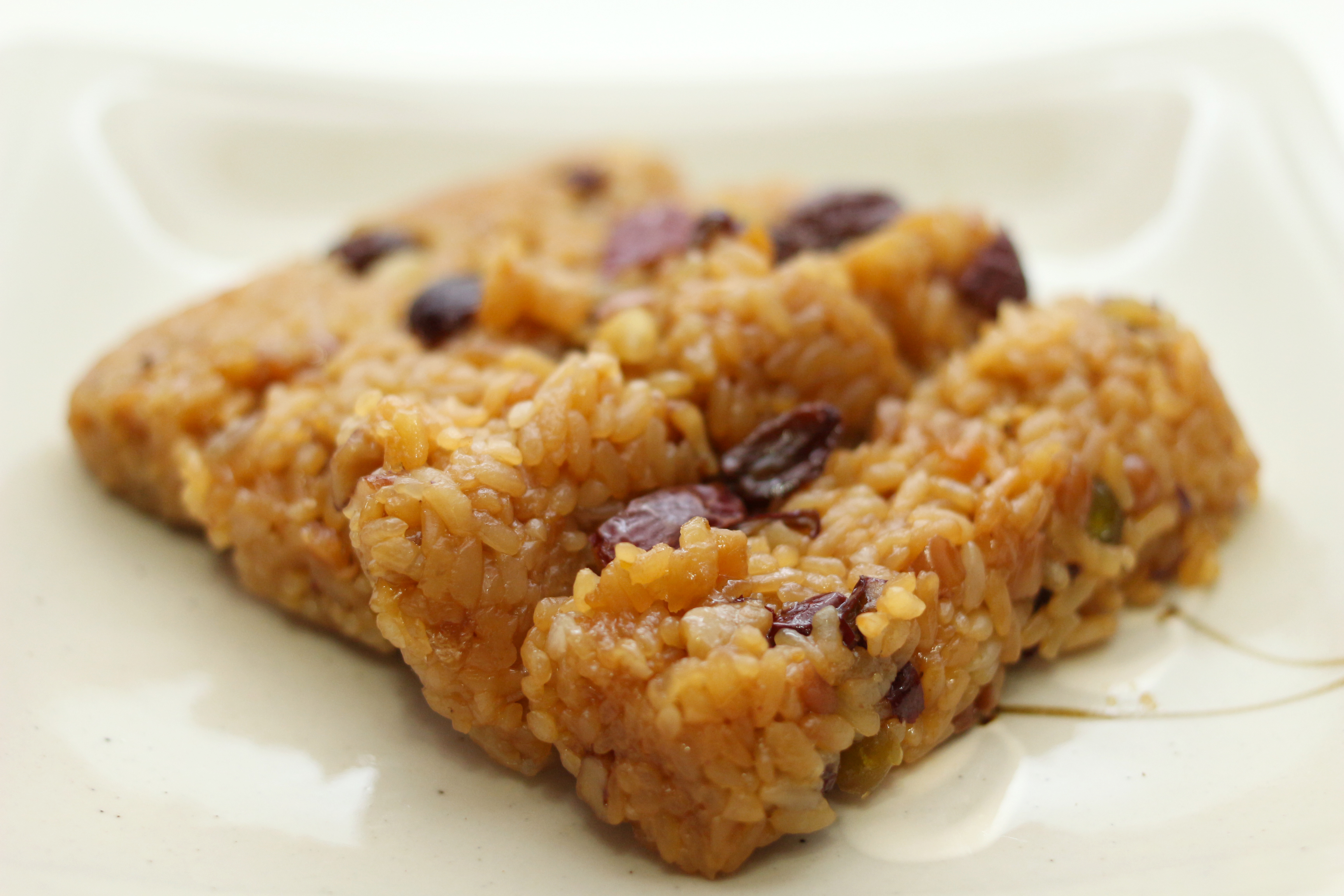
Yakbap

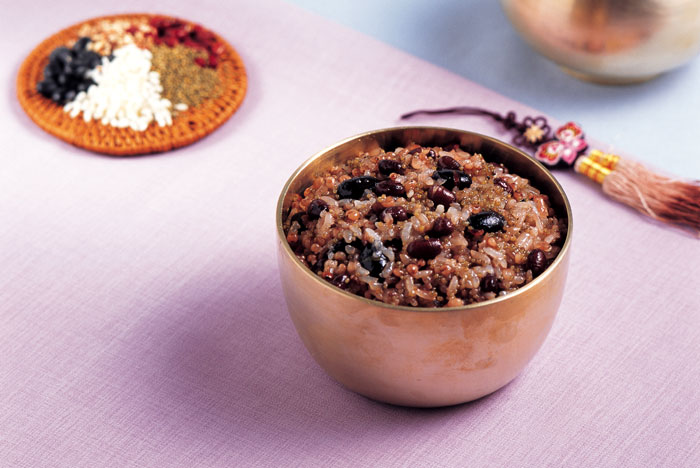
Ogokbap

=== Noodles ===
- Bibim guksu (비빔국수): stirred noodles in a hot and spicy sauce.
- Geonjin guksu (건진국수)
- Jaengban guksu (쟁반국수)
- Janchi guksu (잔치국수): a light seaweed broth based noodle soup served with fresh condiments, usually kimchi, thinly sliced egg, green onions, and cucumbers.
- Japchae (잡채): Boiled dangmyeon or sweet potato noodles, steamed spinach, roasted julienned beef, roasted sliced onion, roasted julienned carrots are mixed with seasoning made of soy sauce, sesame oil and half-refined sugar.
- Jjajangmyeon (짜장면): A variation on a Chinese noodle dish that is extremely popular in Korea. It is made with a black bean sauce, usually with some sort of meat and a variety of vegetables including zucchini and potatoes. Usually ordered and delivered, like pizza.
- Jjapaguri (ram-don)
- Kalguksu (칼국수): boiled flat noodles, usually in a broth made of anchovies and sliced zucchini.
- Makguksu (막국수): buckwheat noodles served in a chilled broth.
- Naengmyeon (In South Korean dialect: 냉면; in North Korean dialect: 랭면; raengmyŏn; 'cold noodles')): Consists of several varieties of thin, hand-made buckwheat noodles, and is served in a large bowl with a tangy iced broth, raw julienned vegetables and fruit, and often a boiled egg and cold cooked beef. This is also called mul ("water") naengmyeon, to distinguish from bibim naengmyeon, which has no broth and is mixed with gochujang.
- Ramyeon (라면): spicy variation of noodle, usually eaten in the form of instant noodles or cup ramyeon.
- Sujebi (수제비)
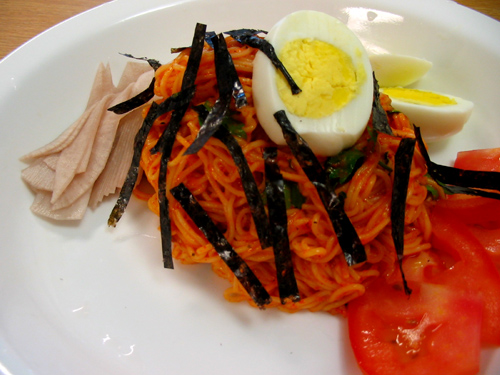
Bibim guksu

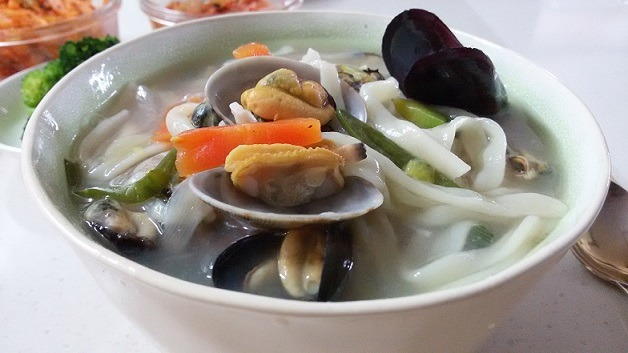
Kalguksu

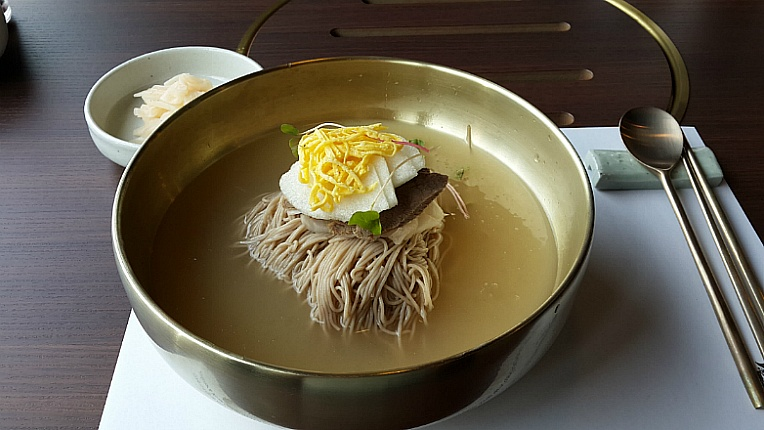
Naengmyeon

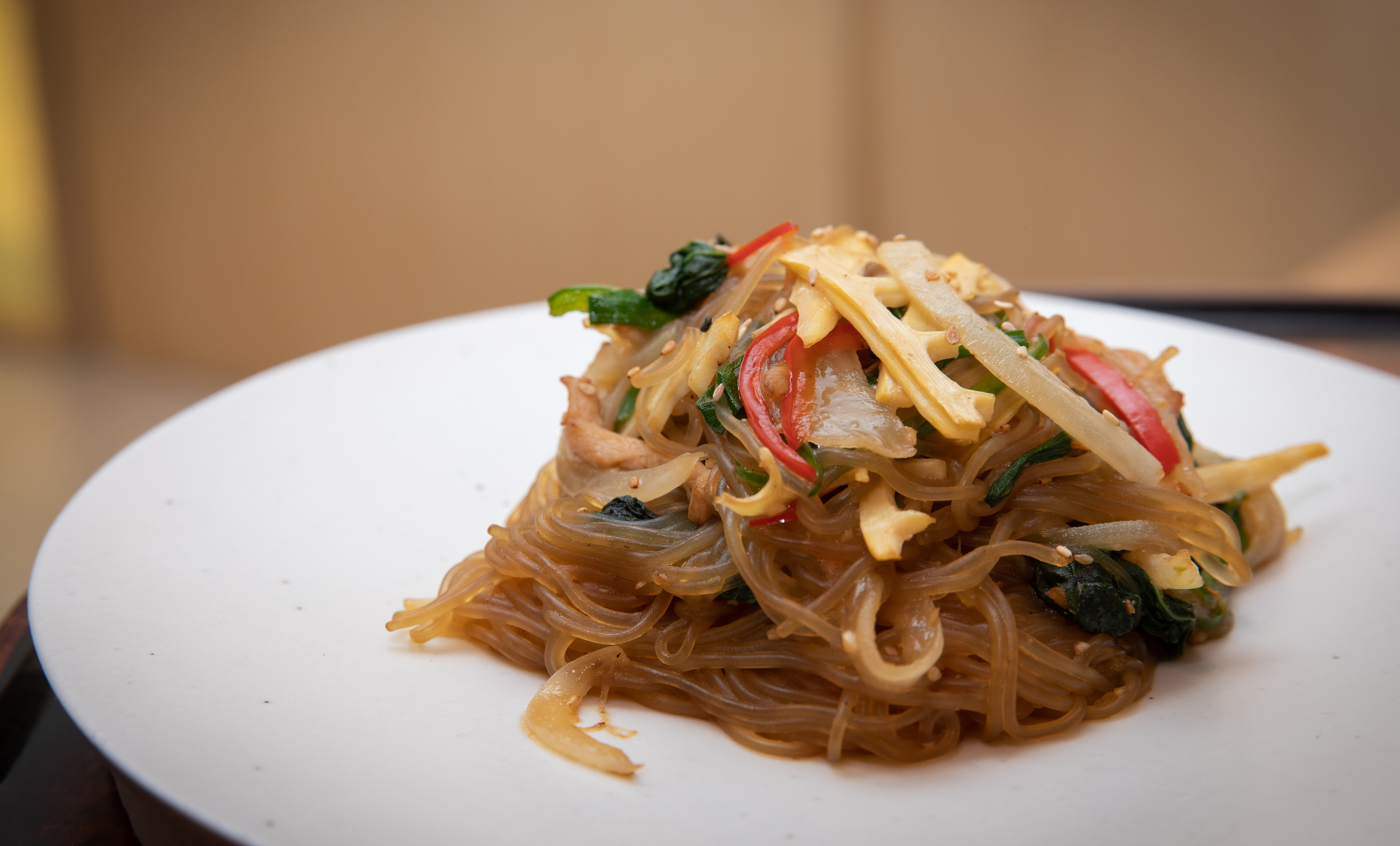
Japchae

=== Bread ===
- Bungeoppang (붕어빵 "carp-bread"): The Korean name for the Japanese fish-shaped pastry Taiyaki that is usually filled with sweet red bean paste and then baked in a fish-shaped mold. It is very chewy on the inside and crispy on the outside.
- Gukhwa-ppang (국화빵): Bread shaped like a flower.
- Gyeranppang (계란빵): a snack food prepared with egg and rice flour.
- Hoppang (호빵)
- Soboro-ppang (소보로빵)

== Kimchi ==
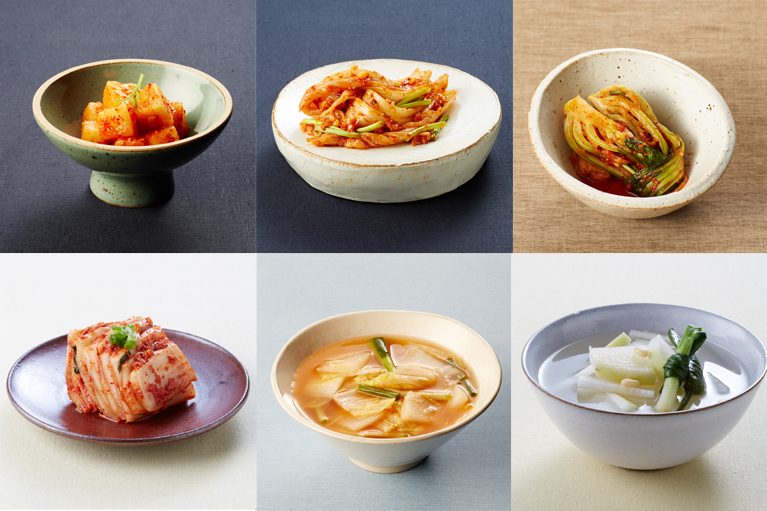
Kimchi

Kimchi vegetables (usually cabbage, Korean radish, or cucumber) are commonly fermented in a brine of ginger, garlic, green onion, and chili pepper. There are endless varieties, and it is served as a side dish or cooked into soups and rice dishes. Koreans traditionally make enough kimchi to last for the entire winter season, although with refrigerators and commercially bottled kimchi, this practice has become less common. Kimchi that is readily made is called geotjeori (겉절이). Sin-kimchi (신김치) is a version that is fermented for longer and is more sour. Moreover, different regions of Korea make kimchi in different ways with different kinds of ingredients. For instance, the lower southern part tends to make it taste more salty to preserve it longer. Some of the extra ingredients they use include squids, oysters, and various other raw seafoods. Kimchi is often cited for its health benefits and has been included in Health magazine's "World's Healthiest Foods." Nonetheless, some research has found nitrate and salt levels in kimchi to be possible risk factors for gastric cancer, although shellfish and fruit consumption were found to be protective factors against gastric cancer. Research has also found kimchi to be a preventive factor for stomach cancer.

- Baek kimchi: kimchi made without chili pepper.
- Buchukimchi: Korean chive kimchi.
- Chonggak kimchi: kimchi made with pony tail Korean radish.
- Ggakdugi: Korean radish kimchi.
- Kkaetnip kimchi: Korean perilla leaf kimchi.
- Mulkimchi: water kimchi.
  - Dongchimi
  - Nabak kimchi
- Oisobakki: cucumber kimchi.
- Pakimchi: scallion kimchi.

== Banchan ==
=== Gui ===
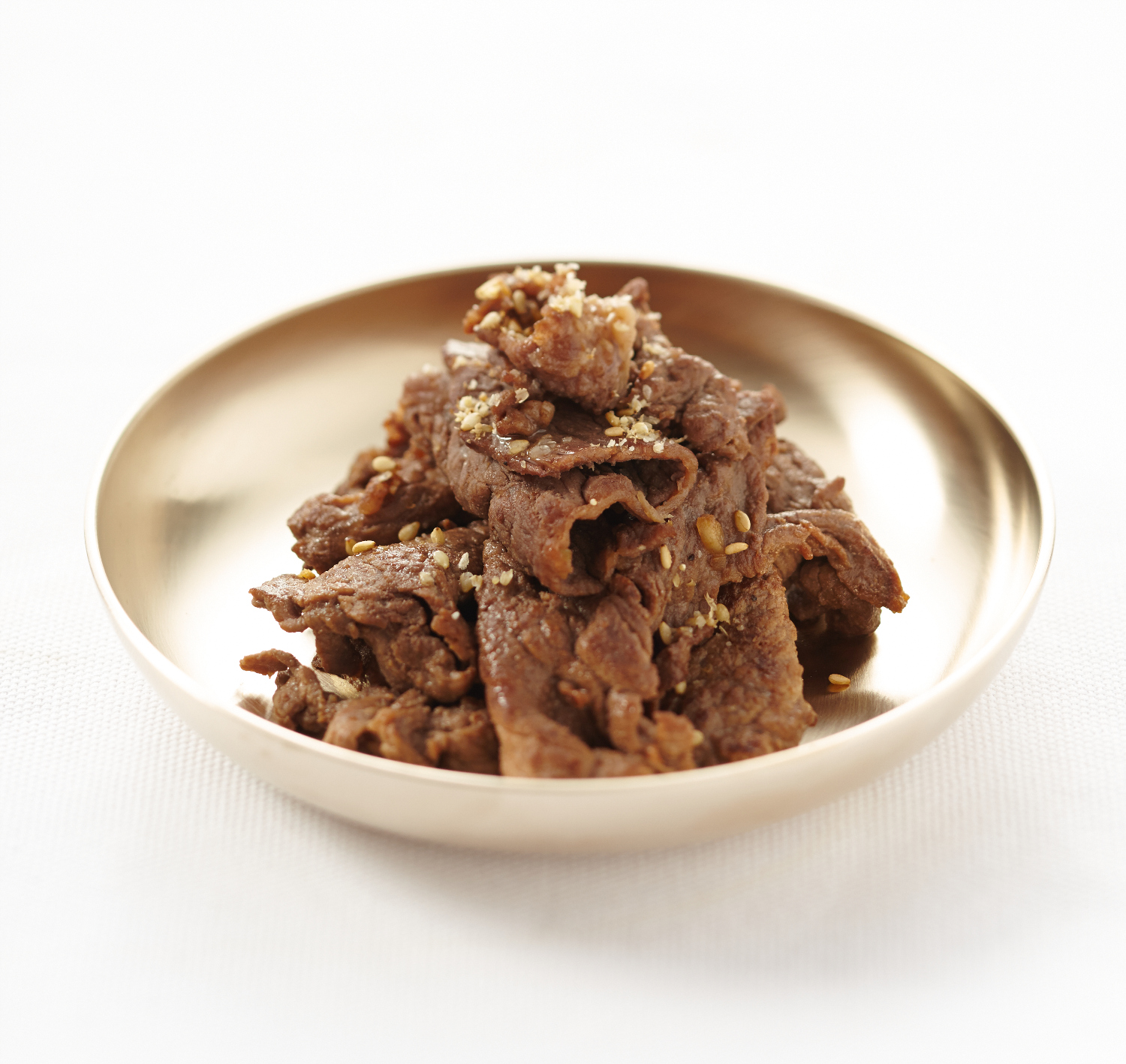
Bulgogi

- Beoseot gui (버섯구이): any kind of grilled mushroom.
- Bulgogi (불고기 "fire meat"): thinly sliced or shredded beef marinated in soy sauce, sesame oil, garlic, sugar, scallions, and black pepper, cooked on a grill (sometimes at the table). Variations include pork (dwaeji bulgogi, 돼지불고기), chicken (dak bulgogi 닭불고기), or squid (ojingeo bulgogi, 오징어불고기).
- Dak galbi (닭갈비): stir-fry marinated diced chicken in a gochujang-based sauce, and sliced cabbage, sweet potato, scallions, onions and tteok.
- Deodeok gui (더덕구이): grilled deodeok (더덕) roots.
- Galbi (갈비): pork or beef ribs, cooked on a metal plate over charcoal in the centre of the table. The meat is sliced thicker than bulgogi. It is often called "Korean barbecue" along with bulgogi, and can be seasoned or unseasoned.
- Gim gui or guun gim (김구이 or 구운 김): grilled dry seaweed sheets (gim).
- Gobchang gui (곱창구이): similar to makchang except prepared from the small intestines of a pig or ox.
- Makchang gui (막창구이): grilled pork large intestines prepared like samgyeopsal and galbi, and often served with a light doenjang sauce and chopped scallions. It is very popular in Daegu and the surrounding Gyeongsang Province region.
- Saengseon gui (생선구이): grilled fish.
- Samgyeopsal (삼겹살): unseasoned pork belly, served in the same fashion as galbi. Sometimes cooked on a grill with kimchi together at either side. Commonly grilled with garlic and onions, dipped in sesame oil and salt mixture and wrapped with ssamjang in lettuce.
- Seokhwa gui or jogae gui (석화구이 or 조개구이): grilled shellfish.

=== Jjim ===
- Agujjim (아귀찜): made by braising blackmouth angler (agui) and mideodeok (미더덕, Styela clava), and kongnamul (soybean sprouts).
- Andong jjimdak (찜닭): made by steaming chicken with vegetables and cellophane noodles in ganjang sauce.
- Galbijjim (갈비찜): made by braising marinated galbi (beef short rib) with diced potato and carrots in ganjang sauce.
- Gyeran jjim (계란찜): steamed egg custard, sometimes with pa (green onions).
- Jeonbokjjim (전복찜): made with abalone marinated in a mixture of ganjang and cheongju (rice wine).
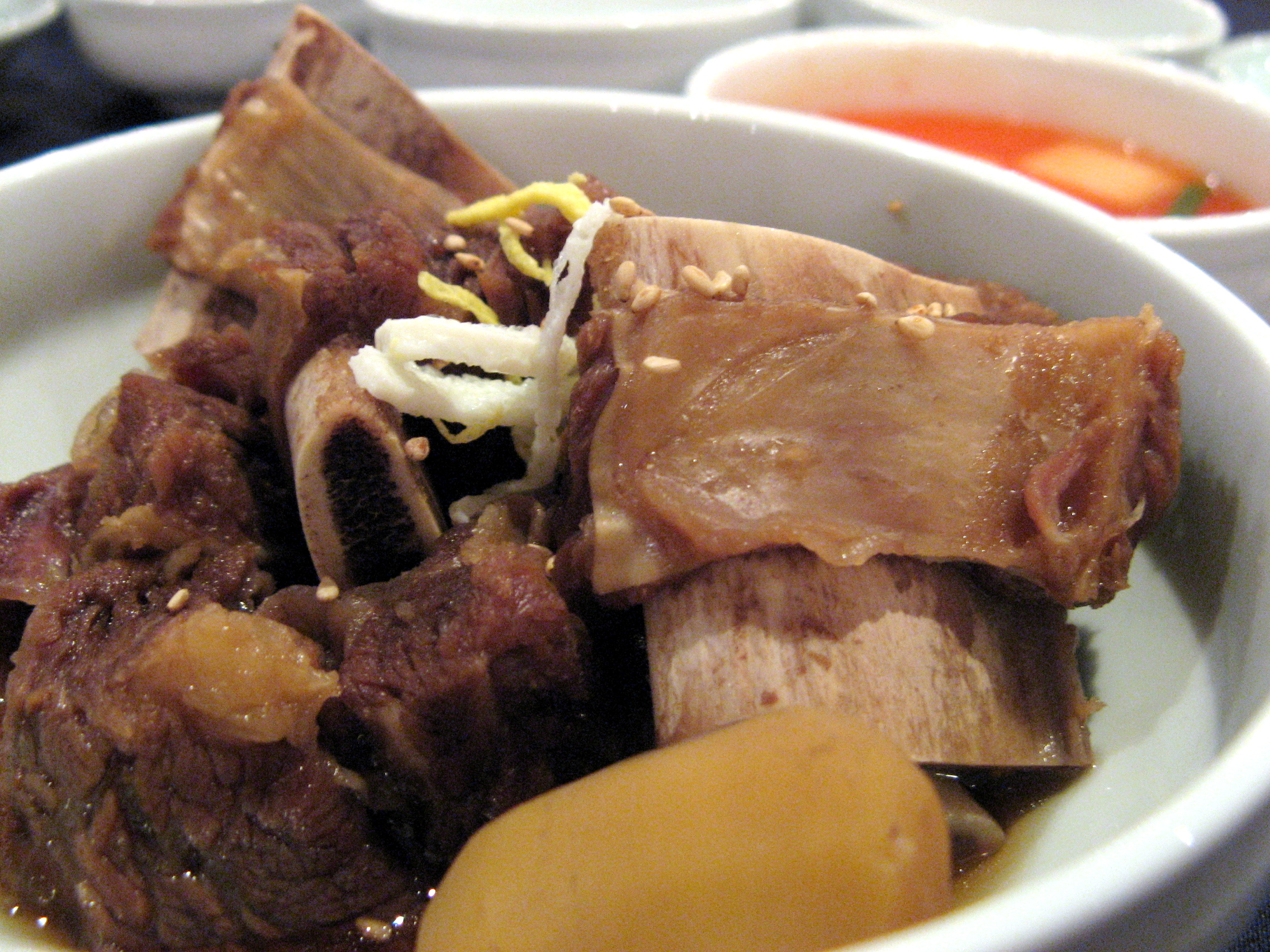
Galbijjim

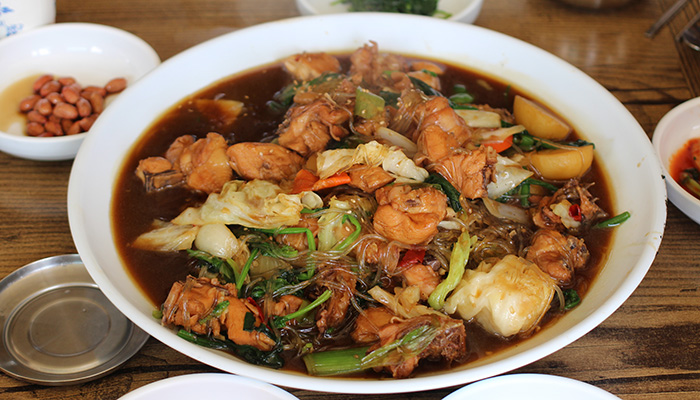
Jjimdak

=== Seon ===
- Oiseon (오이선): traditional Korean dish made from steamed cucumber with beef and mushrooms.

=== Hoe ===
- Ganghoe (강회): a small roll of scallions, carrots and eggs made with scallions or garlic chives.
- Sannakji (산낙지): live octopus served still moving on the plate.
- Sukhoe (숙회): parboiled fish, usually made with squid or octopus.
- Yukhoe (육회): similar to beef tartare.

=== Namul ===
- Chwinamul (취나물)
- Dureubnamul (두릅나물): angelica tree shoots that have been steamed and seasoned with soy sauce and sesame oil.
- Ggaennip (깻잎): perilla leaf that has been marinated with soy sauce and sesame oil.
- Hobaknamul (호박나물): Korean zucchini with tiny shrimp called saeujeot (새우젓).
- Kohsarii (고사리): loyal fern that is usually seasoned with soy sauce.
- Kongnamul (콩나물): Soybean sprouts, usually eaten in boiled and seasoned banchan. Soybean sprouts are also the main ingredient in kongnamul-bap (sprouts over rice), kongnamul-guk (sprout soup), and kongnamul-gukbap (rice in sprout soup).
- Kongjaban (콩자반): black beans cooked in soy sauce and sugar.
- Sanmaneul (산마늘): Alpine leek cooked with vinegar and sugar.
- Shigeunchi (시금치): lightly boiled spinach with a little bit of salt and ground garlic seasoning.

=== Saengchae ===
- Doraji saengchae (도라지생채): made with the roots of Chinese bellflower.
- Oisaengchae (오이생채): cucumber dressed in pepper powder, ground garlic, ground ginger root, sugar, vinegar, sesame oil, or perillar oil.

=== Sukchae ===
- Japchae (잡채): vermicelli noodles cooked with stir-fried vegetables and small pieces of beef, which are cooked in a soy sauce mixture.
- Kongnamul (콩나물): soybean sprouts, usually eaten in boiled and seasoned banchan. Soybean sprouts are also the main ingredient in kongnamul-bap (sprouts over rice), kongnamul-guk (sprout soup), and kongnamul-gukbap (rice in sprout soup).

=== Buchimgae ===
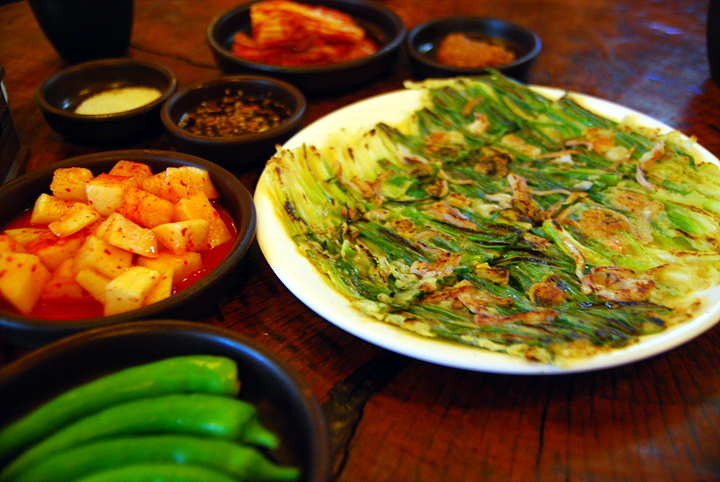
Pajeon

Buchimgae, also known as Korean pancake, is a dish made by pan-frying in oil a thick batter with various ingredients into a thin, flat pancake. It also refers to food made by pan-frying an ingredient soaked in egg or batter mixed with various ingredients. Jeon, a dish made by seasoning whole, sliced, or minced fish, meat, vegetables, etc., and coating them with wheat flour and egg wash before frying them in oil. An aehobak can also be used to make both buchimgae and jeon.

- Aehobakbuchimgae (애호박부침개): a type of buchimgae, made by seasoning julienned aehobak and mixing them with wheat flour and beaten egg, then pan-frying them in oil.
- Bindaetteok (빈대떡): made by grinding soaked mung beans, adding vegetables and meat and pan-frying it round and flat.
- Daegujeon (대구전; 大口煎): made with Pacific cod.
- Dubujeon (두부전): made with tofu.
- Gochujeon (고추전): made with chili peppers.
- Guljeon (굴전): made with oyster.
- Hobakjeon (호박전): a type of jeon, made by slicing aehobak thinly, egg-washing the slices, and pan-frying them in oil.
- Kimchibuchimgae (김치부침개): made by frying a mixture of flour, water, and chopped kimchi.
- Mineojeon (민어전; 民魚煎): made with croaker.
- Pajeon (파전): made by adding spring onions cut long, seafood, etc., into a flour dough, and pan-frying it.
- Pyogojeon (표고전): made with shiitake mushrooms and beef.
- Yeongeunjeon (연근전): made with lotus root.

== Soups and stews ==
=== Guk ===
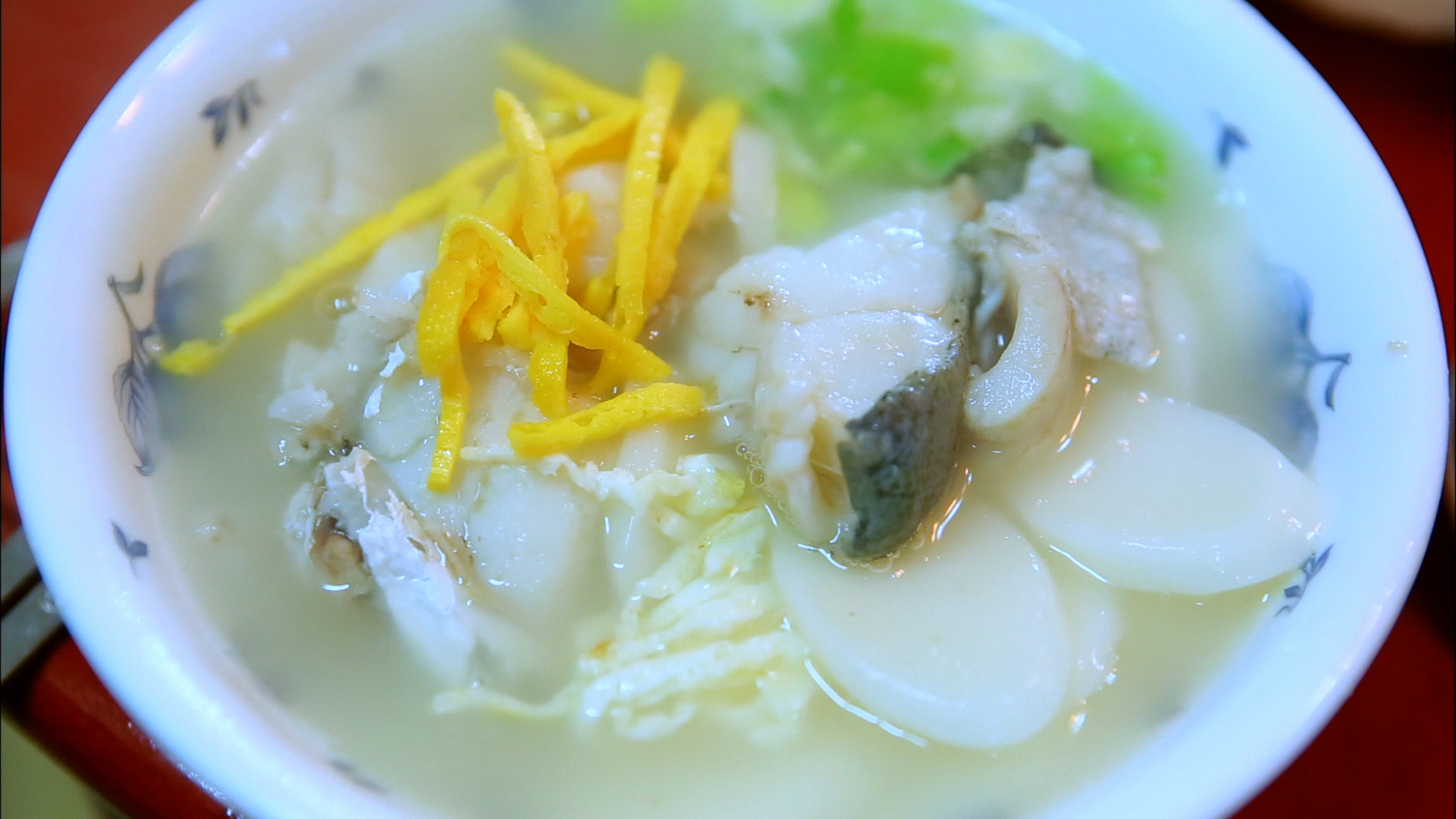
Tteokguk

- Dak-hanmari (닭한마리)
- Gukbap (국밥)
  - Gul-gukbap (굴국밥)
  - Dwaeji-gukbap (돼지국밥)
- Haejang-guk (해장국): a traditional hangover cure consisting of meaty pork spine, dried ugeoji (우거지, dried outer leaves of Napa cabbage or other vegetables), coagulated ox blood (similar to black pudding), and vegetables in a hearty beef broth.
- Mandu-guk (만둣국): dumpling soup.
- Miyeok-guk (미역국): a seaweed soup typically eaten by mothers after giving birth.
- Tteokguk (떡국): tteok (rice cake) soup.
- Yukgaejang (육개장): spicy beef soup.

=== Stews (tang, jjigae, jeongol) ===
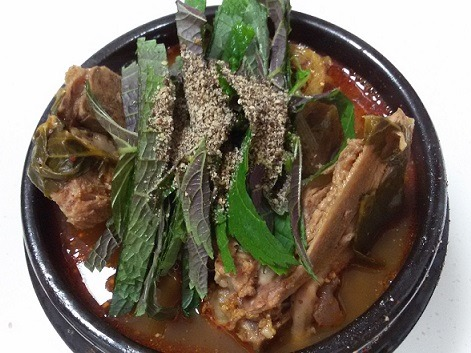
Gamjatang

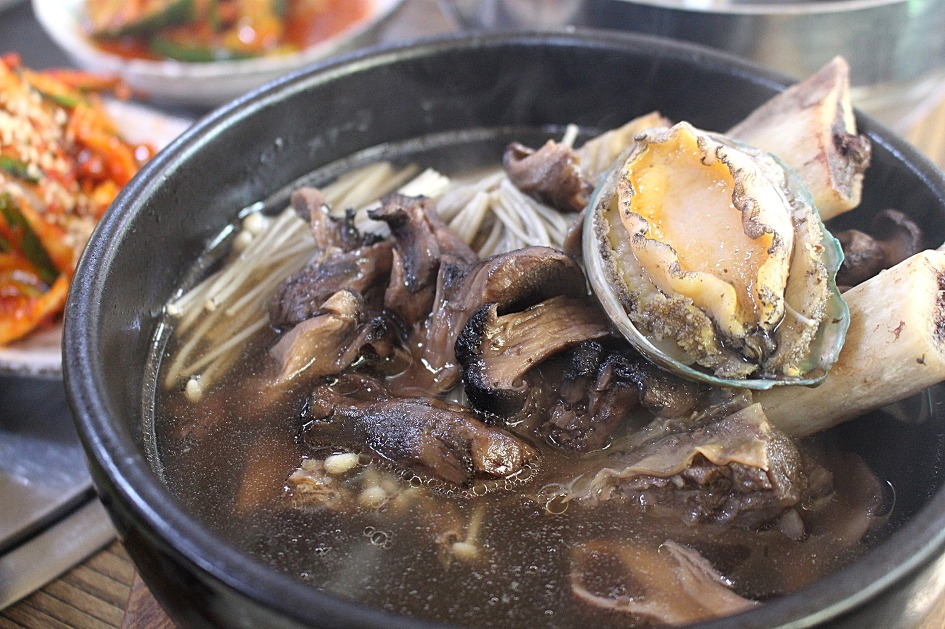
Galbitang

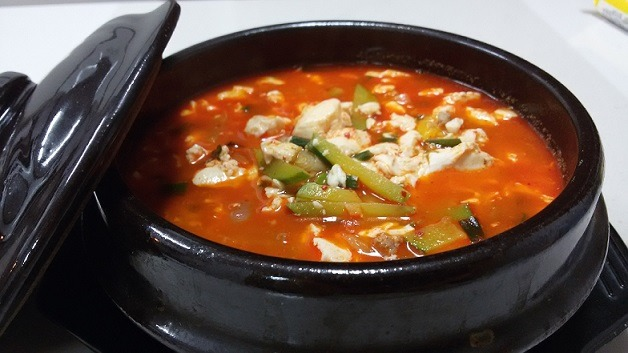
Sundubu-jjigae

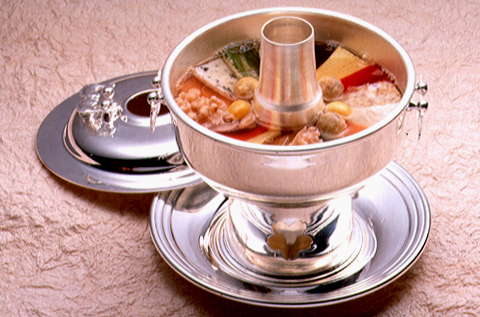
Sinseollo

- Bosintang (보신탕): a soup made primarily with dog meat, boiled with vegetables and spices such as doenjang and gochujang.
- Budae-jjigae (부대찌개 "army base stew"): Soon after the Korean War, when meat was scarce, some people made use of surplus foods from US Army bases such as hot dogs and canned ham (such as Spam) incorporated into a traditional spicy soup. Budae jjigae is still popular in South Korea, and the dish often incorporates more modern ingredients such as instant ramen noodles.
- Cheonggukjang jjigae (청국장찌개): a soup made from thick soybean paste containing whole beans.
- Chueotang (추어탕): ground loach soup, where the loach is boiled and ground to make smooth. The ground loach is mixed with several seasoning and vegetables, and then boiled once more.
- Daktoritang (닭도리탕): A spicy chicken and potato stew. Also known as dakbokkeumtang (닭볶음탕).
- Doenjang jjigae (된장찌개): soybean paste soup, served as the main course or served alongside a meat course. It contains a variety of vegetables, shellfish, tofu, and occasionally small mussels, shrimp, or large anchovies. Typically, anchovies are used for preparing the base stock and are taken out before adding the main ingredients.
- Galbitang (갈비탕): a hearty soup made from short rib.
- Gamja-ongsimi (감자옹심이): variety of hand-pulled dough soup (sujebi) in South Korea's Gangwon cuisine.
- Gamjatang (감자탕, "pork spine stew"): a spicy soup made with pork spine, vegetables (especially potatoes), and hot peppers. The vertebrae are usually separated. This is often served as a late night snack but may also be served for other meals.
- Gochujang jjigae (고추장찌개): chili pepper paste soup.
- Gopchang jeongol (곱창전골): beef entrails and vegetable stew.
- Kimchi jjigae (김치찌개): A soup made with kimchi, pork, and tofu. It is commonly eaten for lunch or with a meat course. It is normally served in a stone pot, still boiling when it arrives at the table.
- Kongbiji jjigae (콩비지찌개): a stew made with ground soybeans.
- Maeuntang (매운탕): a refreshing, hot, and spicy fish soup.
- Oritang (오리탕): a soup or stew made by slowly simmering duck and various vegetables.
- Saengseon jjigae (생선찌개): fish stew.
- Saeujeot jjigae (새우젓찌개): jjigae made with saeujeot (fermented shrimp sauce).
- Samgyetang (삼계탕): a soup made with Cornish game hens that are stuffed with ginseng, mongolian milkvetch (hwanggi 황기), glutinous rice, jujubes, garlic, and chestnuts. The soup is traditionally eaten in the summer.
- Seolleongtang (설렁탕): A beef bone stock that is simmered overnight then served with thinly sliced pieces of beef. Usually served in a bowl containing dangmyeon (당면, cellophane noodles) and pieces of beef. Sliced scallions and black pepper are used as condiments.
- Sinseollo (신선로): elaborate variety of jeongol once served in Korean royal court cuisine.
- Sundubu jjigae (순두부찌개): a spicy stew made with soft tofu and shellfish. Traditionally, the diner puts a raw egg in it while it is still boiling.

== Sweets and snacks ==
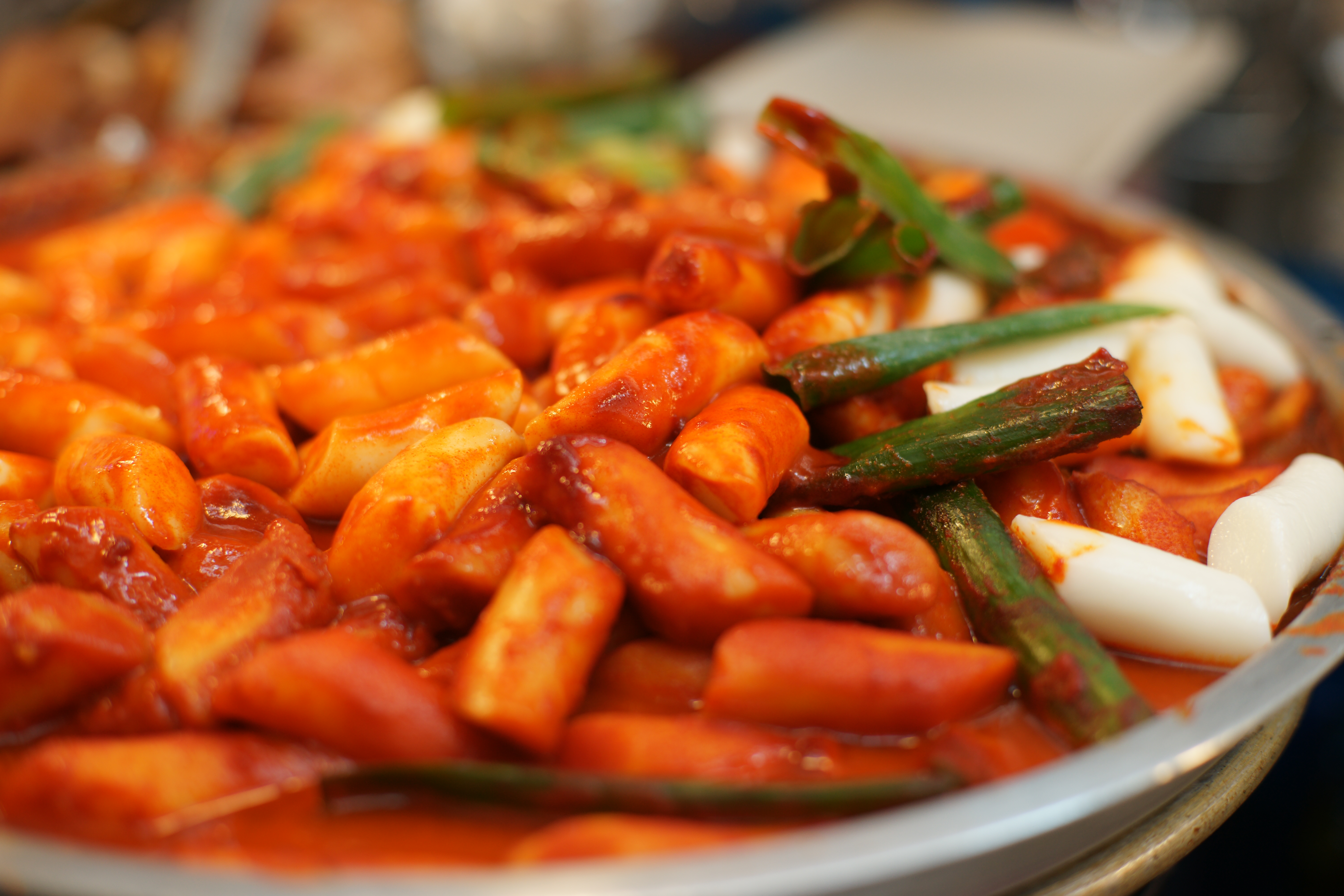
Tteokbokki

- Beondegi (번데기): is steamed or boiled silkworm pupae which are seasoned and eaten as a snack.
- Bungeoppang (붕어빵 "carp-bread"): a Japanese fish-shaped pastry, Taiyaki, that is usually filled with sweet red bean paste and then baked in a fish-shaped mold. It is chewy on the inside and crispy on the outside. Gukwa-ppang (국화빵): similar to bungeoppang, but it is shaped like a flower. Gyeran-ppang (계란빵, egg bread) is a rounded rectangle and contains whole egg inside. They are often sold by street vendors.
- Gyeranppang (계란빵): a snack food prepared with egg and rice flour.
- Hoppang (호빵)
- Hotteok (호떡): similar to pancakes, but the syrup is in the filling rather than a condiment. Melted brown sugar, honey, chopped peanuts, and chinese cinnamon are common fillings. Vegetables are sometimes added to the batter. Hotteok is usually eaten during cold winter months to "warm up" the body with the sweet and warm syrup in the pancake.

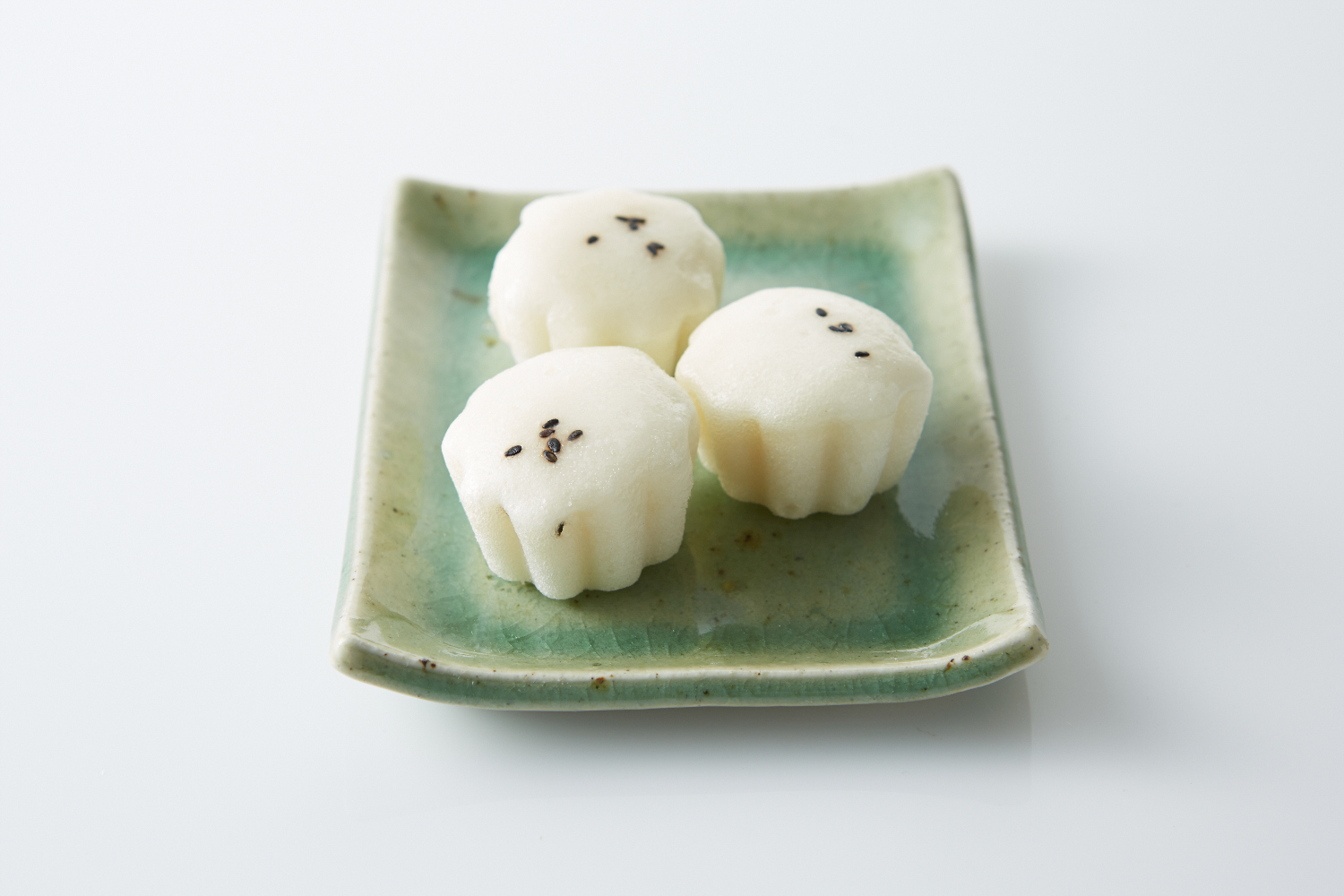
Jeungpyeon

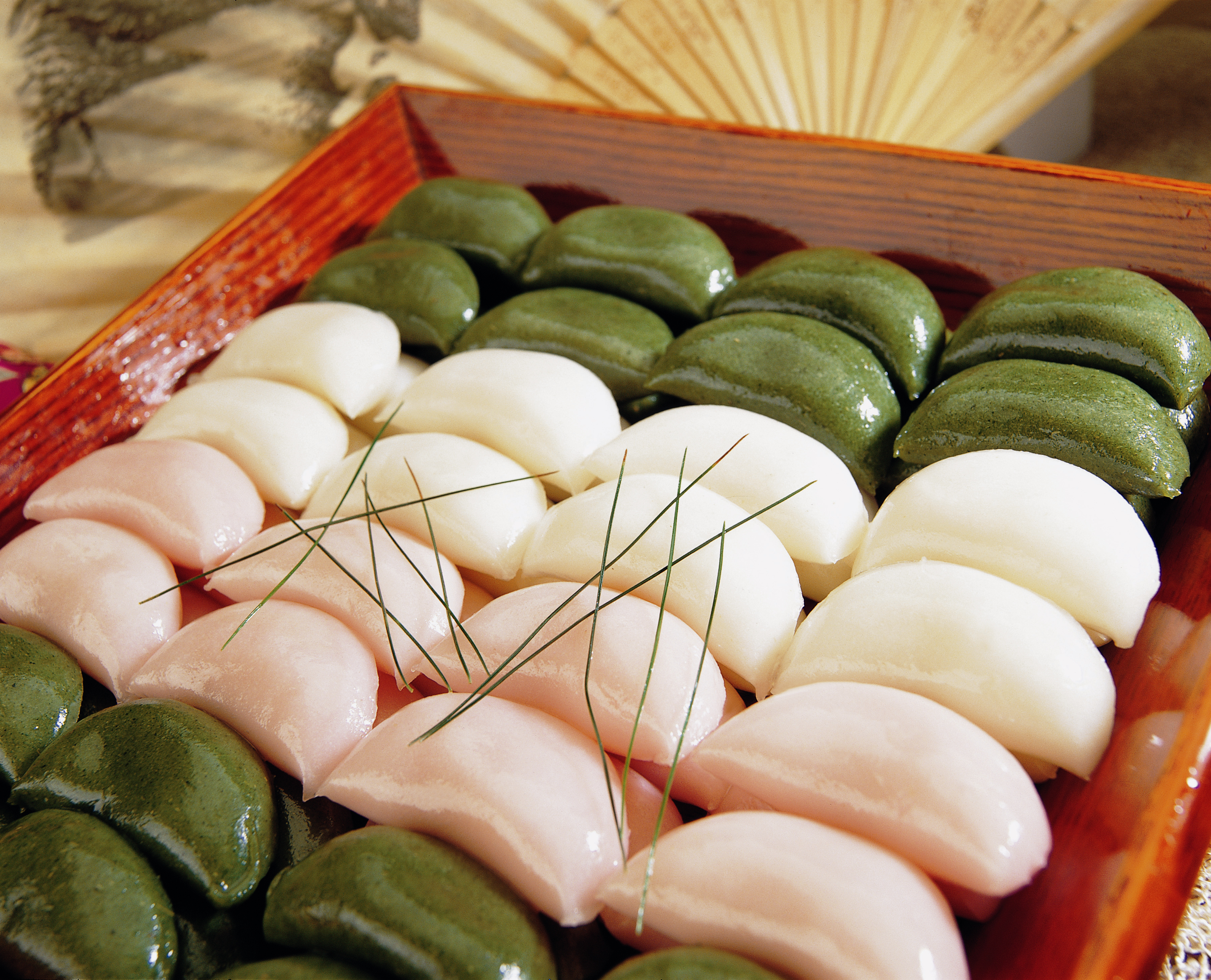
Songpyeon

- Mandu (만두)
  - Eo-mandu (어만두)
- Sundae (순대): Korean sausage made with a mixture of boiled sweet rice, oxen or pig's blood, potato noodle, mung bean sprouts, green onion and garlic stuffed in a natural casing.
- Tteok (떡): a chewy cake made from either pounded short-grain rice (메떡, metteok), pounded glutinous rice (찰떡, chaltteok), or glutinous rice left whole, without pounding (약식, yaksik). It is served either cold, (Note: filled or covered with sweetened mung bean paste, red-bean paste, raisins, a sweetened filling made with sesame seeds, mashed red beans, sweet pumpkin, beans, dates, pine nuts, or honey) usually as a dessert or snack. Sometimes cooked with thinly sliced beef, onions, oyster mushrooms, etc. to be served as a light meal.
  - Songpyeon (송편): chewy stuffed tteok (rice cake) served at Chuseok (Mid-Autumn Festival) decorated with pine needle. Honey or red bean paste is used as filling.
  - Yaksik (약식): is a dessert made with glutinous rice, chestnuts, pine nuts, jujubes, and raw sugar and soy sauce and then steamed for seven to eight hours or until the mixture turns a blackish color. Some recipes call for topping the cooked mixture with persimmons.
  - Chapssaltteok (찹쌀떡): a variety of tteok filled with sweet bean paste. Similar to Japanese mochi.
- Tteokbokki (떡볶이): a dish which is usually made with sliced rice cake, fish cakes, and is flavored with gochujang.

== Drinks ==
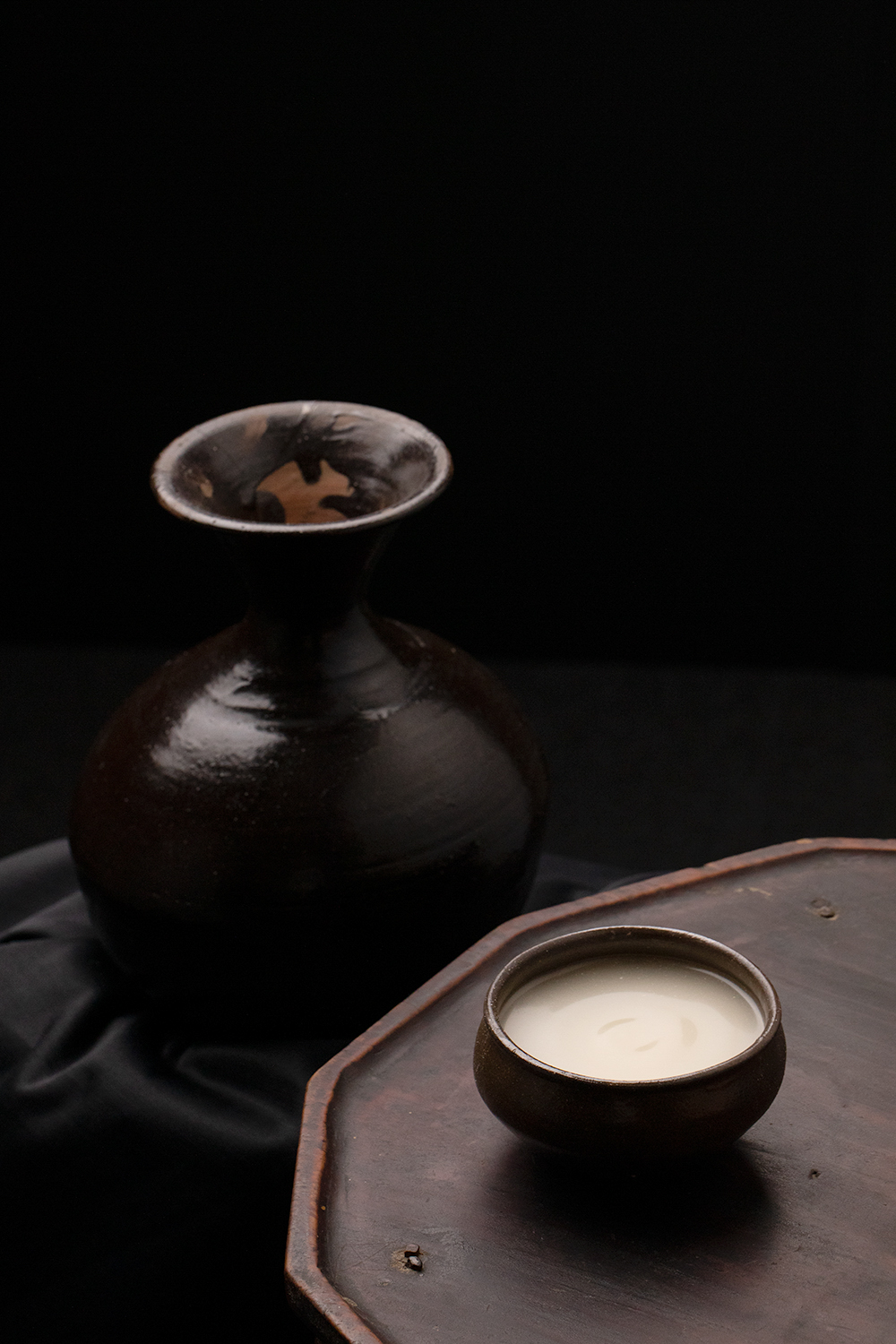
Makgeolli

- Bori-cha (보리차): roasted barley tea.
- Gyeolmyeongja-cha (결명자차; 決明子茶): made from roasted sicklepod seeds.
- Hyeonmi-cha (현미차): roasted brown rice tea.
- Insam-cha (인삼차): Korean ginseng tea.
- Misutgaru (미숫가루): several grains such as rice, barley, beans, glutinous rice, brown rice, Coix lacryma-jobi var. ma-yuen, etc. are roasted and then ground to be added to water.
- Oksusu-cha (옥수수차): roasted corn tea.
- Saenggang-cha (생강차): tea made from ginger root.
- Sikhye (식혜): sweet rice beverage.
- Sungnyung (숭늉): beverage made from the remainder of cooked, boiled, scorched rice removed from the cooking pot, mixed with water and boiled into a soup.
- Sujeonggwa (수정과): dried persimmon punch.
- Yuja-cha (유자차): Yuzu tea.
- Yulmu-cha (율무차): Coix lacryma-jobi var. ma-yuen tea.

=== Alcoholic beverages ===
- Baekse-ju (백세주)
- Cheongju (청주)
- Makgeolli (막걸리): Korean rice wine.
- Soju (소주)
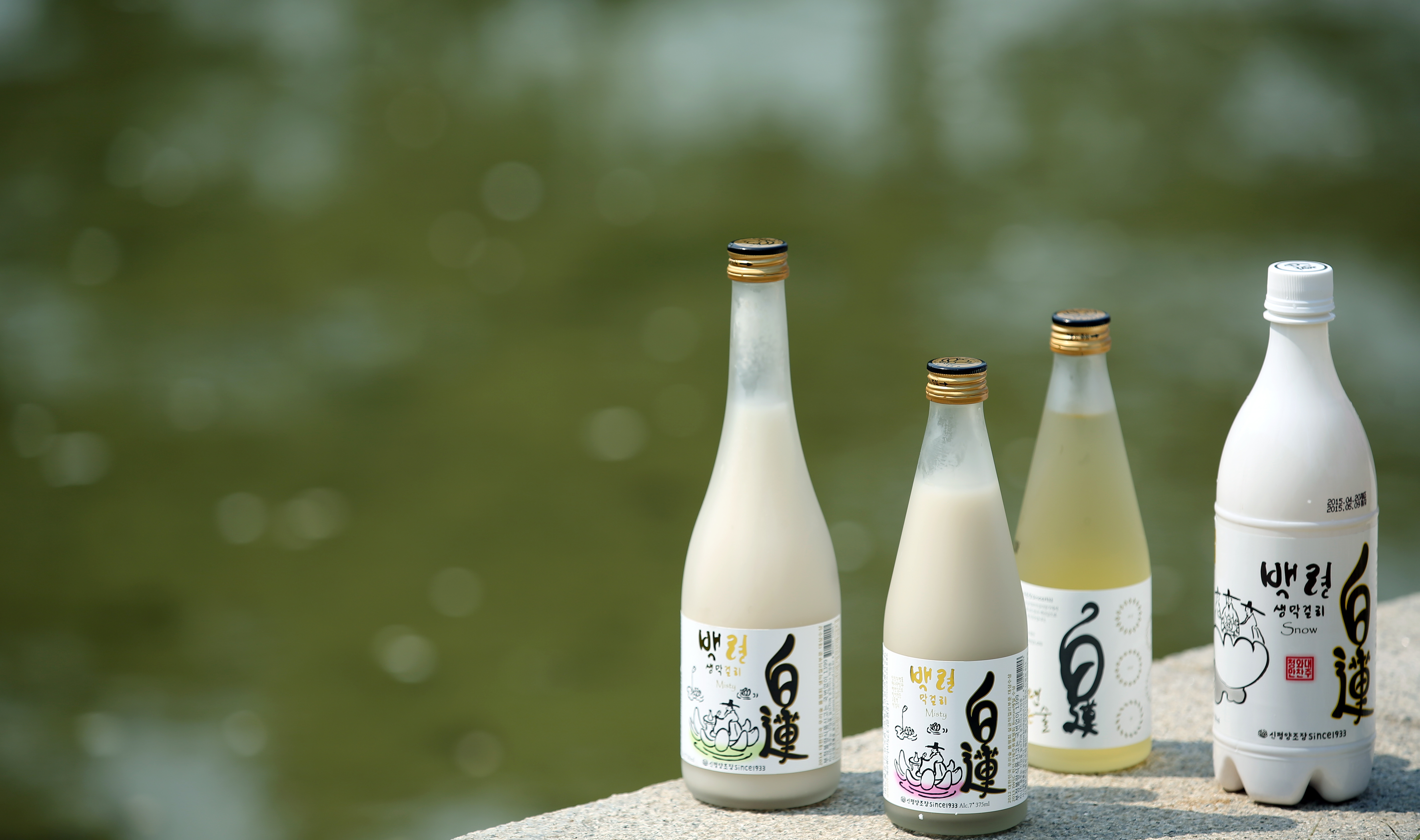
Makgeolli

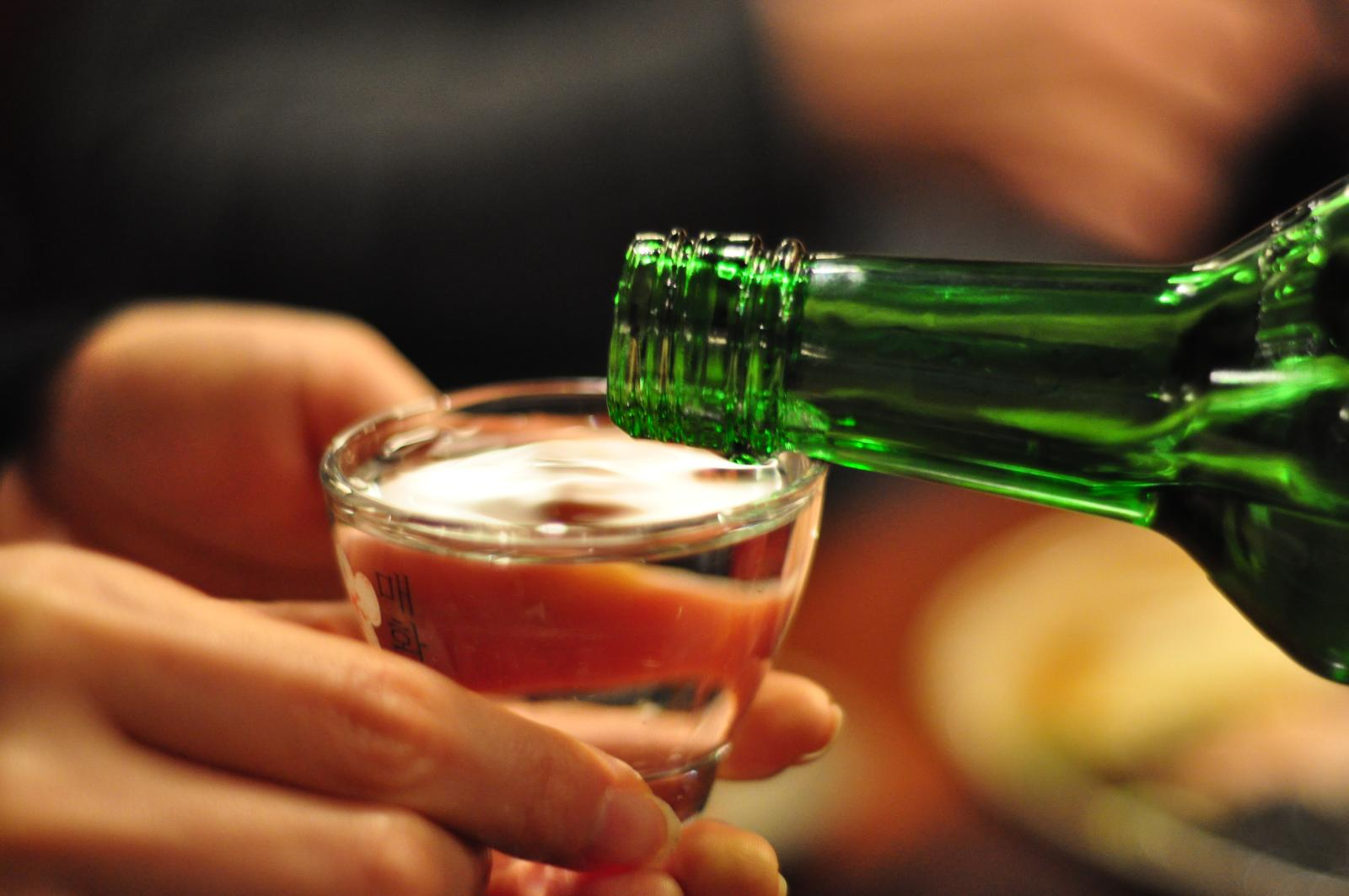
Soju

== Anju ==
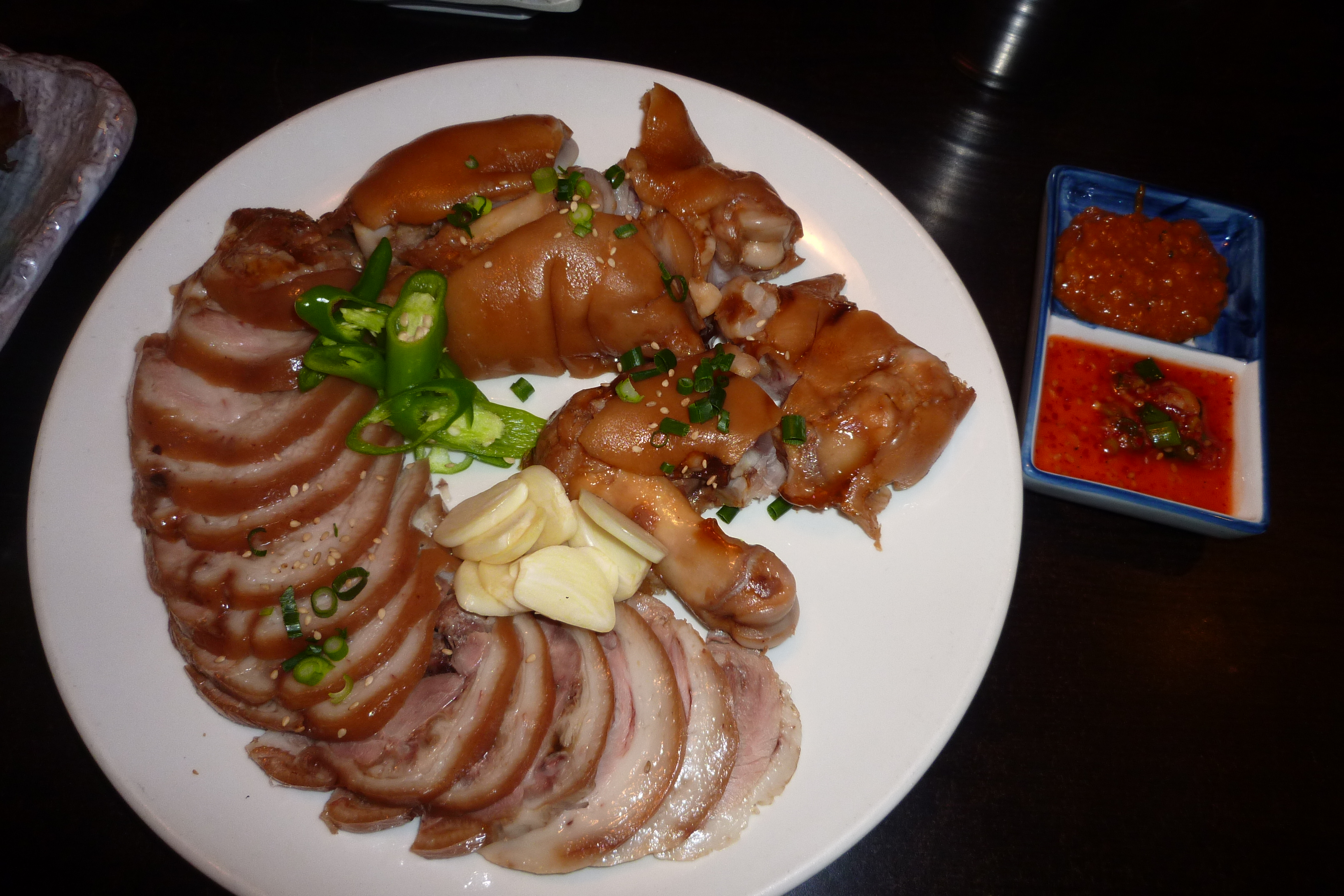
Jokbal dish

Anju (안주) is a general term for a Korean side dish consumed with alcohol (often with soju). It is commonly served at bars, karaoke bars (noraebang), and restaurants that serve alcohol. These side dishes can also be ordered as appetizers or even a main dish. Some examples of anju include steamed squid with gochujang, assorted fruit, dubu kimchi (tofu with kimchi), peanuts, odeng/ohmuk, gimbap (small or large), samgagimbap (triangle-shaped gimbap like the Japanese onigiri), sora (소라, a kind of shellfish popular in street food tents), and nakji (small octopus). Sundae is also a kind of anju, as is samgyeopsal, or dwejigalbi. Most Korean foods may be served as anju, depending on availability and the diner's taste. However, anju are considered different from the banchan side dishes served with a regular Korean meal.

- Jokbal (족발): pig's feet served with a red salted shrimp sauce called saeujeot.

== Royal court dishes ==
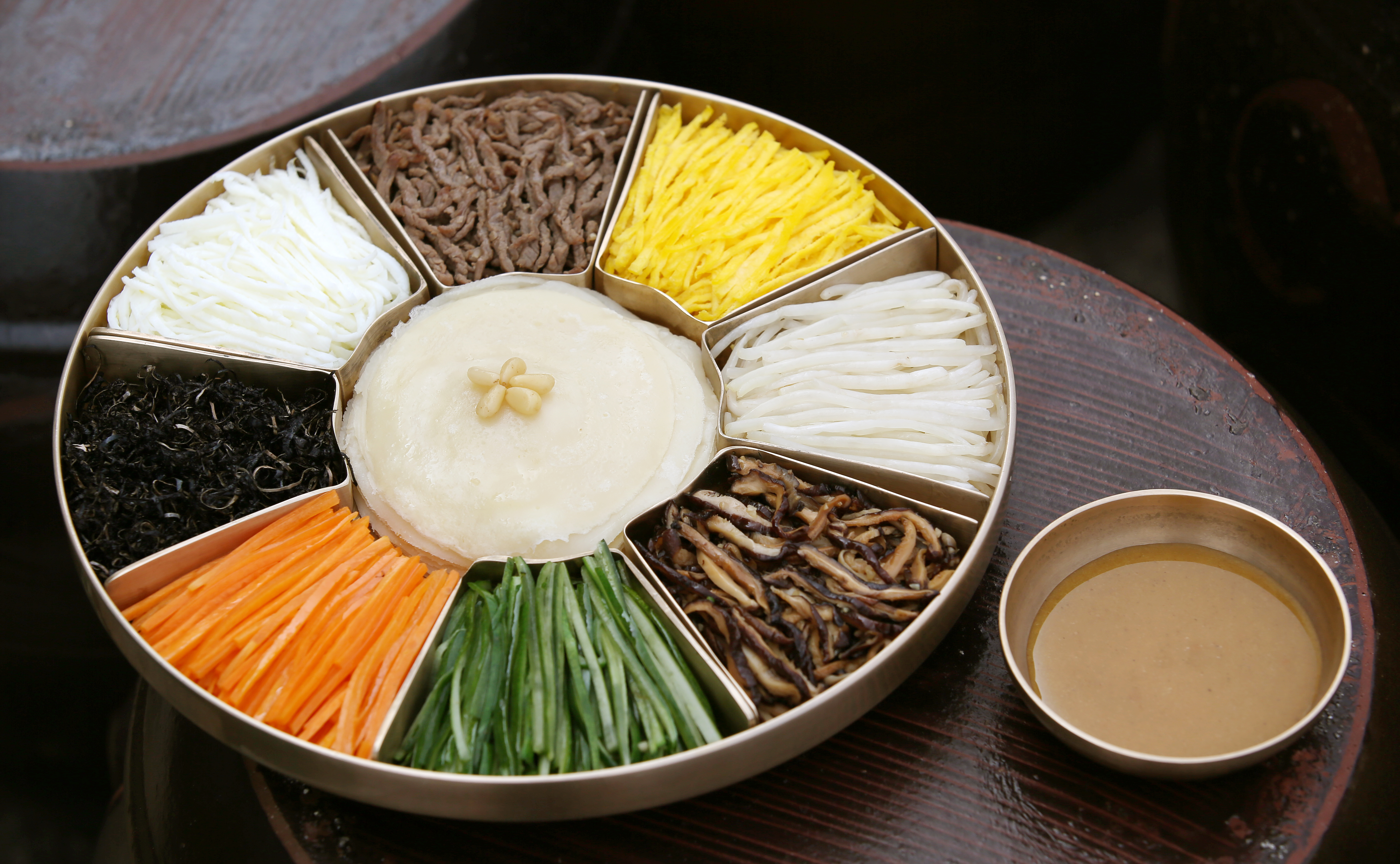
Gujeolpan

- Gujeolpan (구절판): "nine-sectioned plate", an elaborate dish consisting of a number of different vegetables and meats served with thin pancakes. It is usually served at special occasions such as weddings, and is associated with royalty.
- Sinseollo (신선로): An elaborate dish of meat and vegetables cooked in a rich broth. It is served in a large silver vessel with a hole in the center, where hot embers are placed to keep the dish hot throughout the meal.

== Imported and adapted foods ==
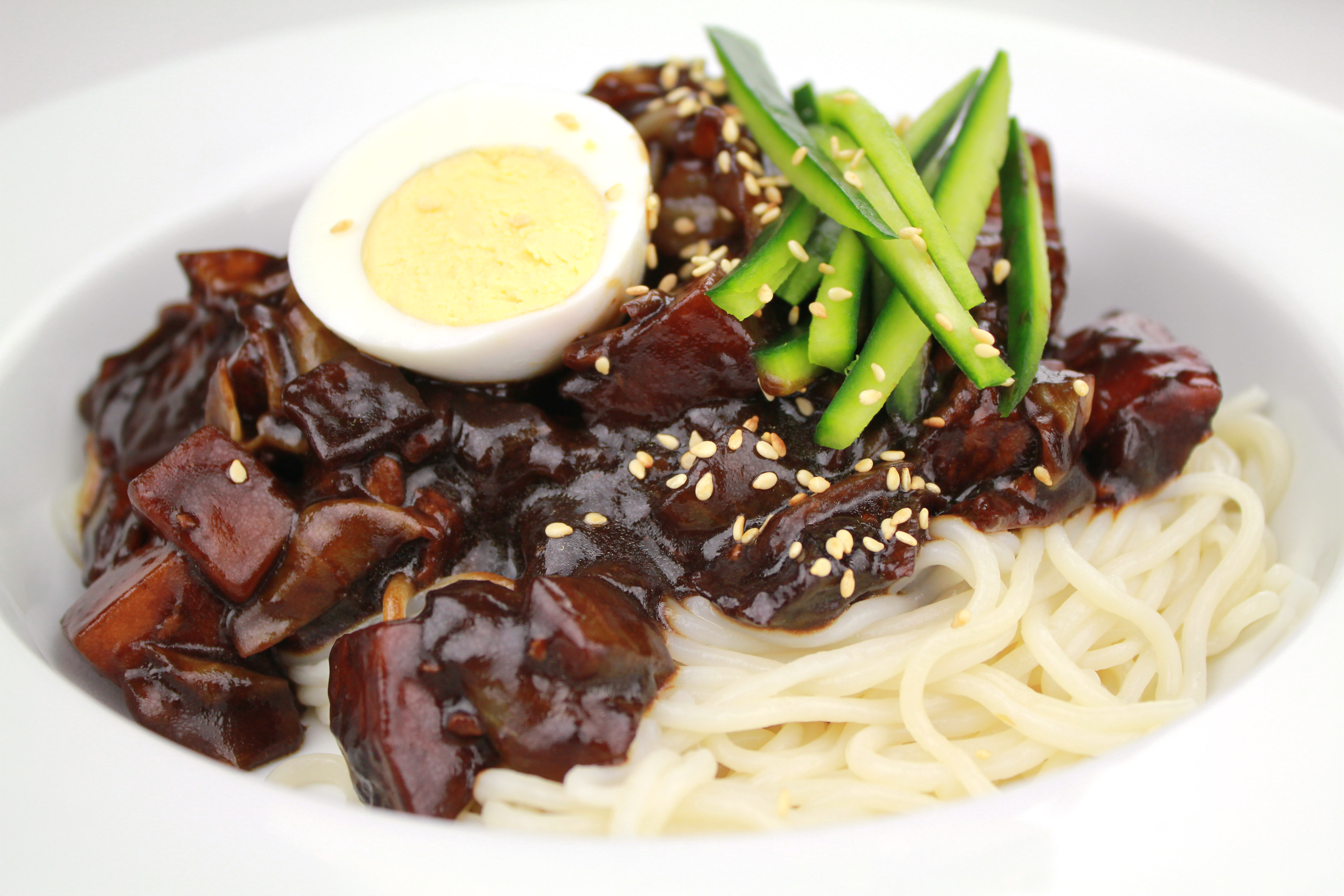
Jajangmyeon

- Korean Chinese cuisine
  - Jajangmyeon (짜장면)
  - Jjamppong (짬뽕)
  - Jungguk-naengmyeon (중국냉면)
  - Kkanpunggi (깐풍기)
  - Kkanpung saeu (깐풍새우)
  - Rajogi (라조기)
  - Tangsuyuk (탕수육)
  - Udong (우동)
  - Ulmyeon (울면)
- Westernized Korean cuisine
  - Budae-jjigae
  - Korean Fried Chicken
    - Yangnyeom chicken

== Seasonings ==
- Gochujang (고추장)
- Doenjang (된장)
- Ssamjang (쌈장)

== See also ==
- Korean cuisine
- Korean baked goods
