= Ji Jong Hwo =

Coordinates: 13.7456868°N 100.5019742°E

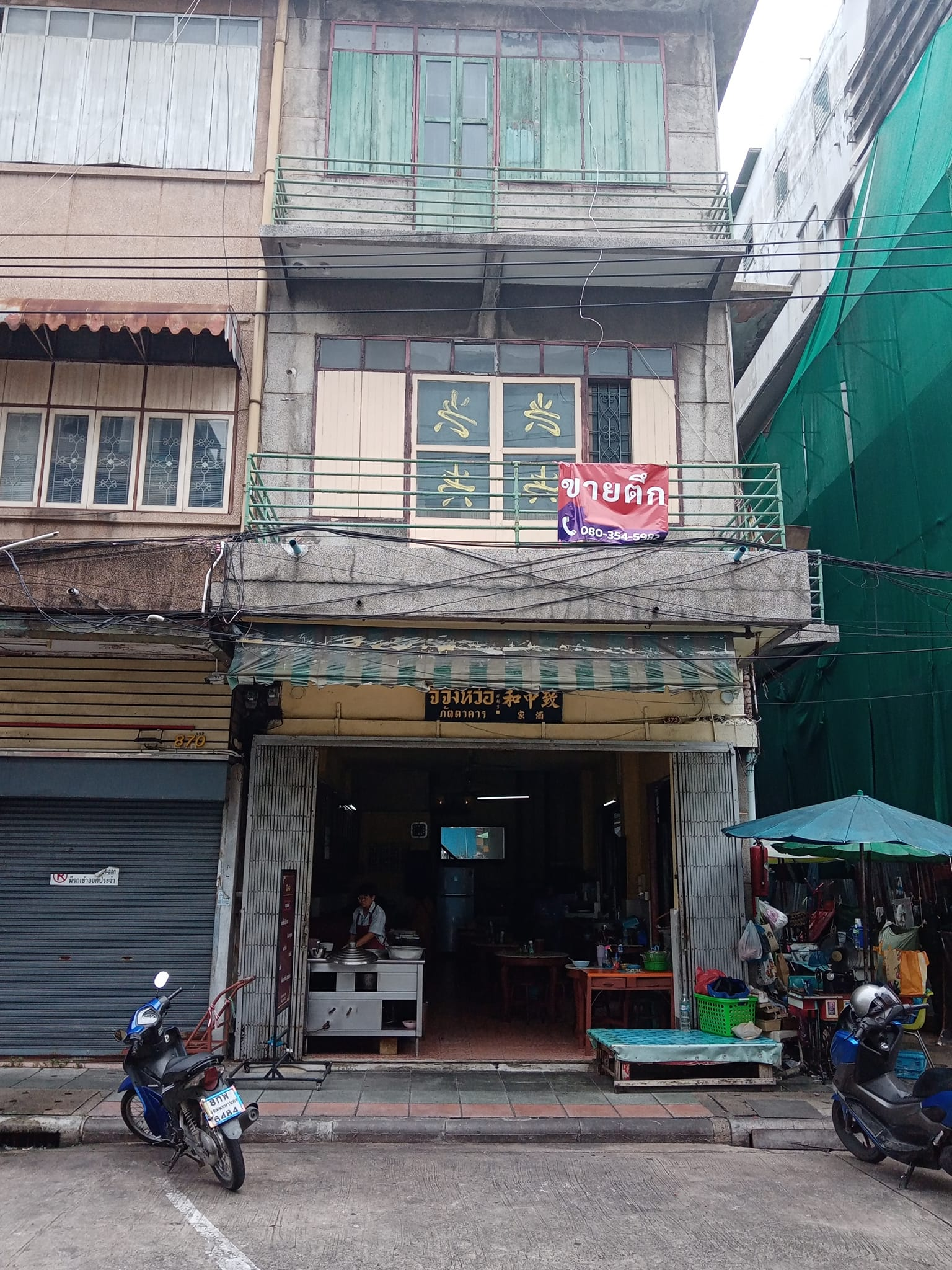
- Front façade of Ji Jong Hwo
- Interactive map of Ji Jong Hwo

Restaurant information
- Established: 1950
- Owner: Wanna Horattanaruang
- Previous owner: Chaiyot Horattanaruang
- Food type: Cantonese cuisine; Phat kaphrao
- Dress code: Casual
- Location: 872 Phiraphong rd, Wang Burapha Phirom, Phra Nakhon, Bangkok, 10200, Thailand

Ji Jong Hwo (Thai: จีจ้งหว่อ ภัตตาคาร; Chinese: 致中和; Jyutping: Zi3 Zung1 Wo4) is a Chinese restaurant in Bangkok.

This old and humble restaurant has a long history, thanks to its location in the former shopping and entertainment district of Bangkok, Wang Burapha. A place that was extremely popular and flourished in the 1960s and 1970s. Its history is that it has been open since 1950. It was originally located in Chinatown quarter. Later, following a fire, it was moved to Wang Burapha. The founder and first owner heard that there was a project to make Wang Burapha area an entertainment centre with three cinemas, so he decided to settle here, located facing one of them, Queens, was known for showing Bollywood and Columbia Pictures movies.

Ji Jong Hwo serves Cantonese cuisine. Popular dishes include stewed duck soup noodles and dumplings, beef rad na, roasted red pork fried rice, and steamed dumplings.

According to Chaiyot Horattanaruang, the second-generation business owner, in the early days, a bowl of noodles cost 2 baht. At that time, Wang Burapha was very lively and his shop was doing very well. He spent five hrs stewing the duck to let the seasonings seep into the meat, so that even chewing the bones was flavourful.

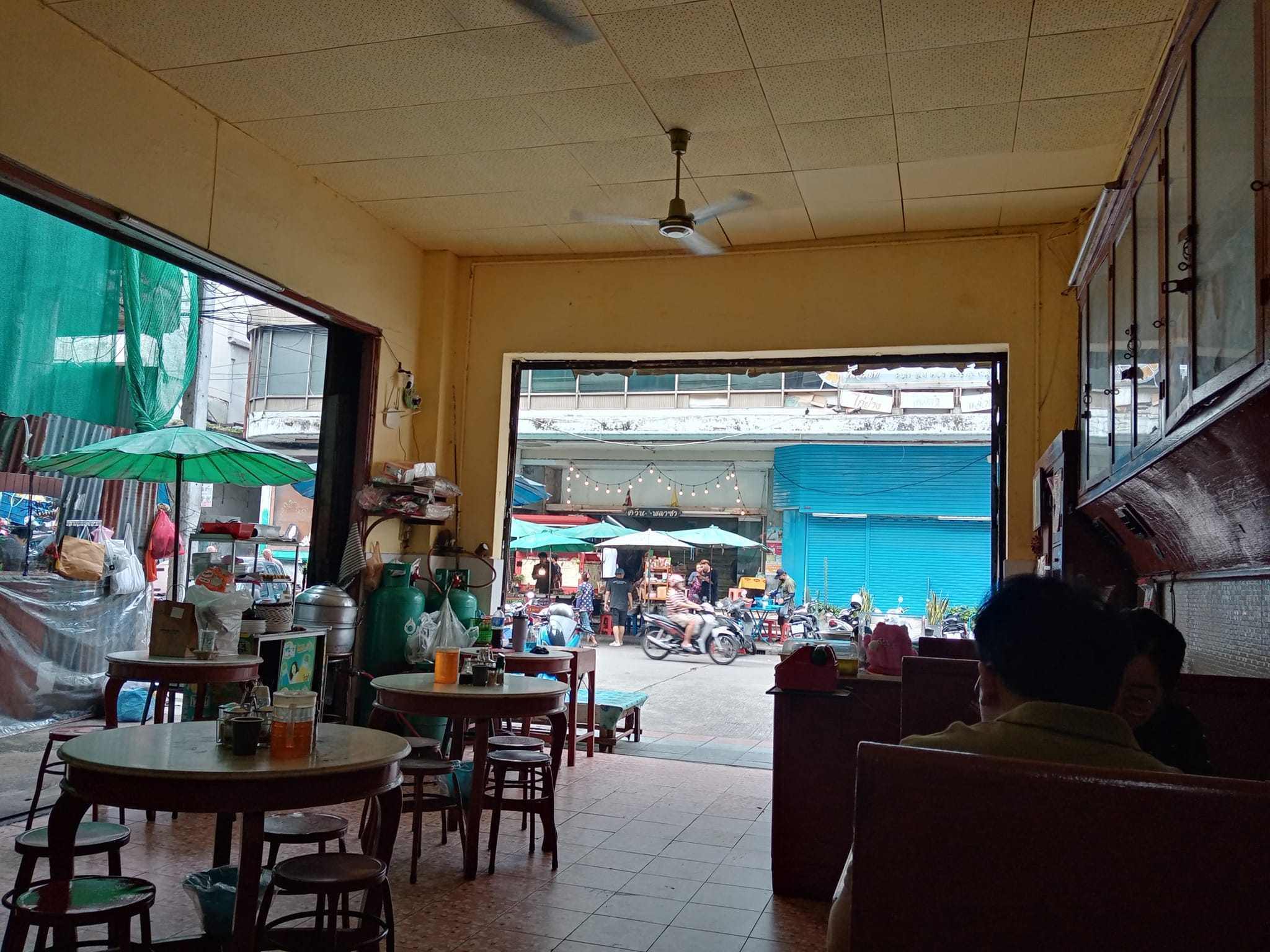
Within the restaurant

Before the restaurant was renovated, the cooking area was on the fourth floor, delivered via a hand-pulled dumbwaiter. The atmosphere inside was filled with charm and a feeling of the olden days, with it decorated in the original style from its heyday. As it is a meeting point or hangout spot for celebrities and popular actors, just like On Lok Yun, those in the same area. One of the regular customers was Dang Bireley, a famous teen gangster in the 1960s, whose story was made into a 1997 movie Dang Bireley's and Young Gangsters. Therefore, Ji Jong Hwo was also used as the filming location for the movie, in the coffee shop scene where Dang and his gang are introduced. The wooden benches that appear in the scene are actually from the restaurant, the second to last bench was his usual seat.

The restaurant is currently run by Chaiyot's daughter, Wanna, who is considered the third generation business heir.
