= On Lok Yun =

Eatery and coffee shop in Bangkok, Thailand

Coordinates: 13.746953°N 100.500593°E

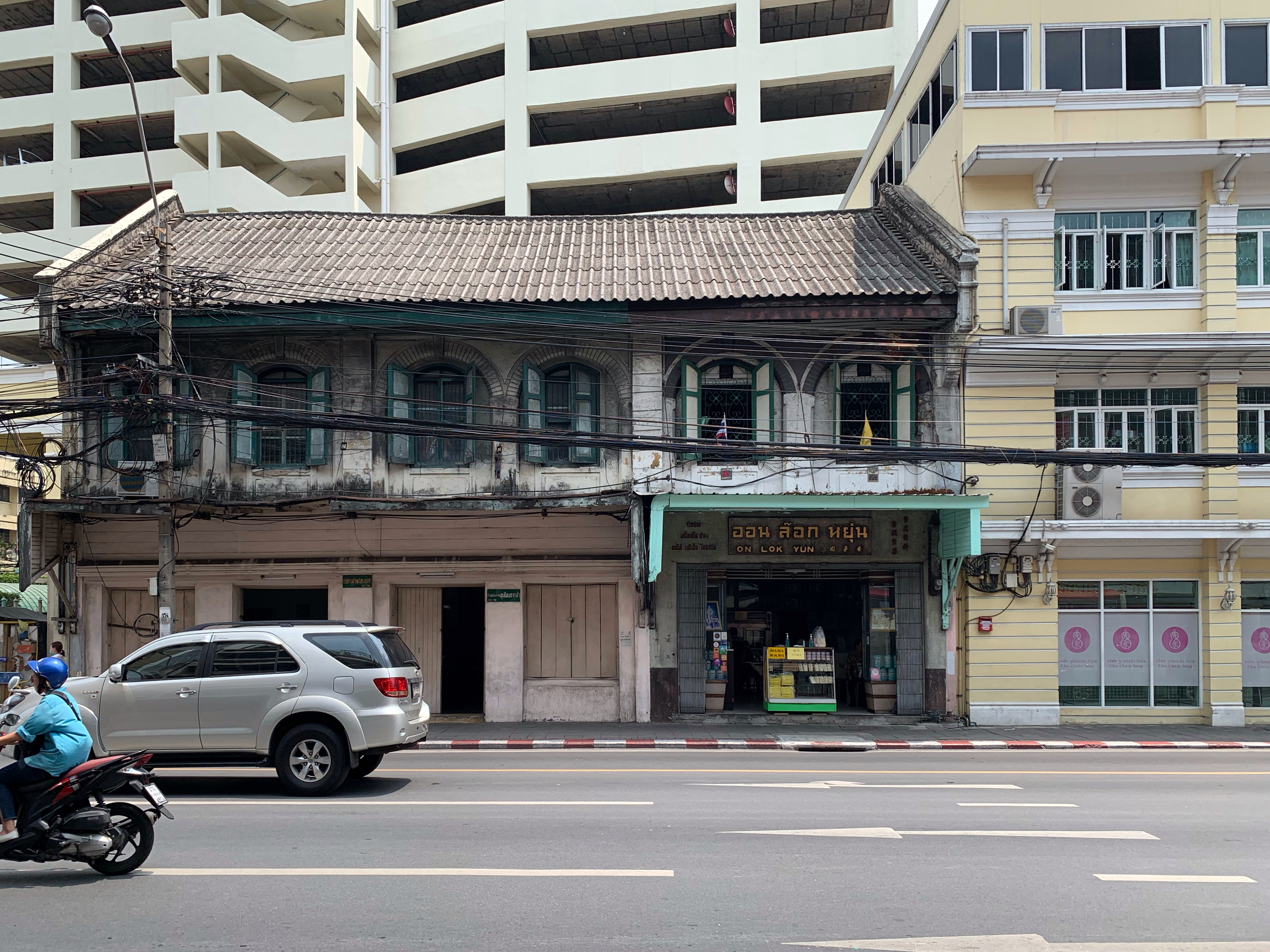
- Façade of On Lok Yun
- Interactive map of On Lok Yun

Restaurant information
- Established: 1933
- Owner: Sombat "Chang" Thayanukul
- Previous owners: Lei Teng-chang; Kanchana Thayanukul
- Food type: Thai-style American breakfast; Traditional coffee
- Dress code: Casual
- Location: 72 Charoen Krung rd, Wang Burapha Phirom, Phra Nakhon, Bangkok, 10200, Thailand

On Lok Yun (Thai: ออน ล๊อก หยุ่น; Chinese: 安樂園; Jyutping: On1 Lok6 Jyun4; pinyin: 'Ān lèyuán) is an eatery and coffee shop in Bangkok. It is an old coffee shop that serves Thai-style American breakfast and has been in business for over 90 years.

Founded in 1933 by overseas Chinese, the father of the current owner, along with two friends, jointly invested in opening a kopi tiam-style coffee shop that was popular in Singapore, a format that has never been seen before in Thailand.

On Lok Yun is located inside a humble two-story shophouse, and is adorned with vintage cabinets and old tin cans of Milo, the Nestlé choco-malt drink popular in Southeast Asia, which gives a retro atmosphere.

Its name is Cantonese and means "amusement park".

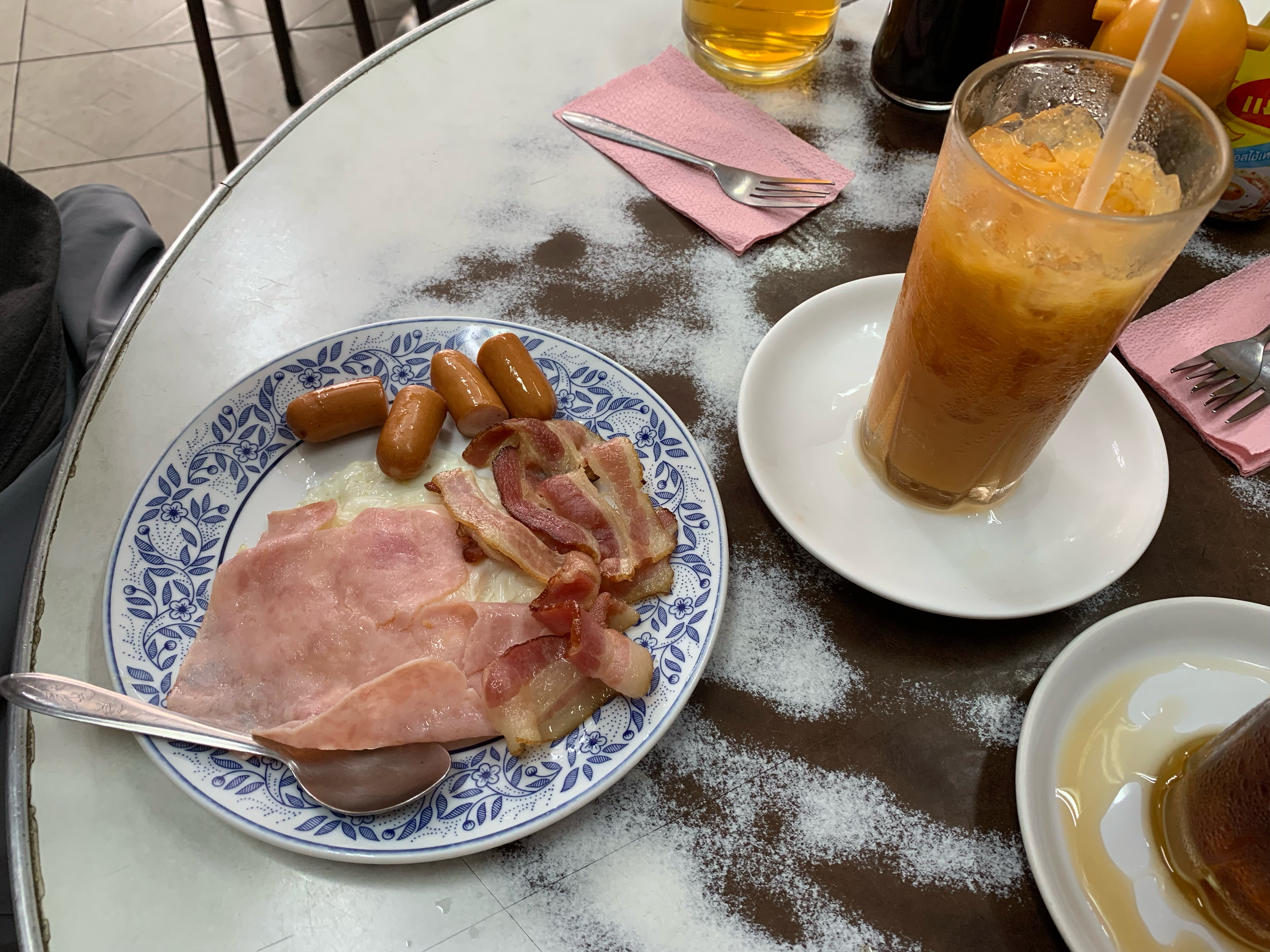
American breakfast with Chinese sausage and iced coffee served in the shop

Its location is on Charoen Krung road in the Wang Burapha, a commercial and entertainment district that was extremely prosperous in the late 1950s to the 1960s. At that time, Wang Burapha was considered a spot for youngsters, so it was full of movie theatres and various restaurants with cafés. On Lok Yun was one of them, it was like a hangout for celebrities and popular stars. Most people come here to eat before watching a movie.

From the beginning until now, the menu served in the shop has always been the same and has never changed.

Popular menu items include steamed bread with coconut jam or locally known as kaya, and French toast.

As 2024, it was passed down to the fourth generation. The shop is open every day from 6:00 am to 2:30 pm, except for Chinese New Year and Songkran festivals.

== See more ==
- Kopi tiam
- Ji Jong Hwo – another nearby old restaurant
