= Dak-hanmari =

South Korean chicken soup dish

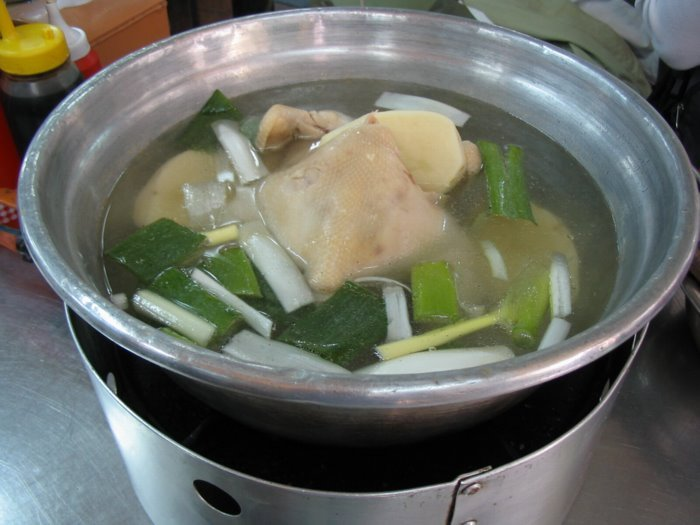
- Place of origin: South Korea
- Region or state: Downtown Seoul
- Associated cuisine: South Korean cuisine
- Main ingredients: Chicken

Korean name
- Hangul: 닭한마리
- RR: dakhanmari
- MR: takhanmari

Dak-hanmari (Korean: 닭한마리) is a South Korean chicken soup dish originated in areas around Dongdaemun in Downtown Seoul since 1960s. While the dak-hanmari dish has quite similar appearance with chicken based baeksuk, the recipe is clearly different from it, as most of restaurants serves this dish with kalguksu, which is certainly not a part of baeksuk.

The dish literally means "a whole chicken" in Korean because diners can have several types of food altogether from a chicken; chicken flesh, its rich soup, kalguksu, potatoes, and garaetteok (cylinder-shaped rice cake). It can be eaten with a clear broth just like baeksuk, or seasoned with gochujang (chili pepper paste) based sauce.

Origin of its name and recipe is not clearly established by records. Some of restaurant owners say the name of dish is originated from customers lack of patience, simply yelling 'Dak-hanmari!' to order something made of a whole chicken. Yet others say the name of dish is originated from intention of emphasizing the idea of consuming the entire chicken. For example, the dish literally serves "an entire chicken", as eating this dish usually requires two steps; eating an entire chicken pot as variant of baeksuk at the first phase, and eating a kalguksu after instantly cooking it from soup of the dak-hanmari.

Dongdaemun dak-hanmari Alley is an alley with many dak-hanmari restaurants located in areas near Dongdaemun in easternmost part of Jongno District, Seoul.
