= Samgye-tang =

Korean soup with whole stuffed chicken

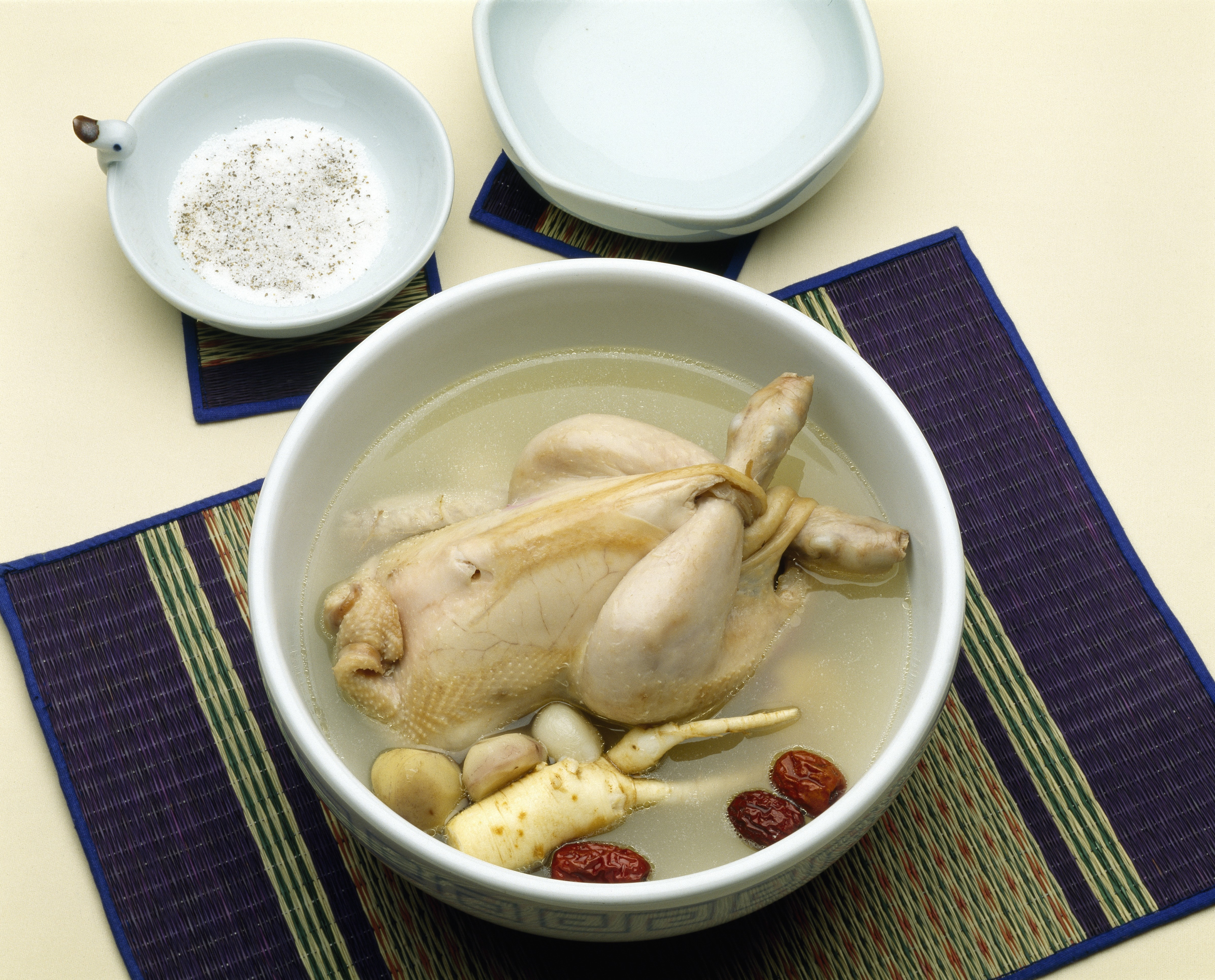
- Alternative names: Ginseng chicken soup
- Type: Tang
- Place of origin: Korea
- Serving temperature: Hot or warm
- Main ingredients: Chicken, quail, ginseng
- Ingredients generally used: Jujube, glutinous rice

Korean name
- Hangul: 삼계탕
- Hanja: 蔘鷄湯
- RR: samgyetang
- MR: samgyet'ang
- IPA: [sam.ɡje̞.tʰaŋ]

Samgye-tang (Korean: 삼계탕), or "ginseng chicken soup" is a tang (Korean soup) that consists primarily of a whole young chicken (poussin) or quail filled with garlic, rice, jujube, mung bean, and ginseng. It is traditionally considered to be a health food. Samgye-tang is a representative summer health food. Soup made with chicken that is slightly larger than the chick is called yeonggye baeksuk, and the chicken is divided into half is called banggye-tang.

== History ==
During the Joseon period (1392–1897), people enjoyed the numerous chicken soup dishes that were similar to samgye-tang, including yeongye-tang, chonggye-tang, and hwanggye-tang. While it was the custom to make a soup with young chicken and serve it to elders during the summer days, the chicken boiled with milkvetch roots and its broth were served to the sick queen during King Injo's reign. However, the description of the dish that most closely resembles today's form of samgye-tang can be found in Joseon yorijaebeop (조선 요리제법; 朝鮮料理製法), the cookbook. Bang Sin-yeong, a professor of Ewha Womans University, wrote in 1917 to compile the information on how to make various traditional dishes of Joseon. In the book, it is described that dakguk (닭국), or chicken soup, is made by gutting a chicken and stuffing the inside with three spoons of glutinous rice and one spoon of ginseng powder, followed by tying up the opening and boiling the chicken with ten bowls of water. During the Japanese colonial era, the Japanese officials who investigated the cultures of former Joseon noted that rich families boiled the chicken stuffed with ginseng and used the broth as medicine in summer.

The dish began to be commercially sold at restaurants around the 1940s and under the name gyesam-tang (계삼탕; 鷄蔘湯) in the 1950s, which meant chicken ginseng soup. With the supplying of modern refrigerators in Korea, it became possible to preserve a ginseng as whole instead of powder. Thus, since the 1960s, it became more common to stuff the chicken with a whole piece of ginseng instead of powder, reaching today's form of the dish. To emphasize the medicinal effects of the ginseng in the soup, many people since then have started calling the dish samgye-tang (ginseng chicken soup) instead of gyesam-tang (chicken ginseng soup).

== Custom ==
It is a custom in Korea to eat samgye-tang during hot summer days in order to replenish the nutrients that were lost through sweating and physical activities. It is especially popular to eat this chicken soup on sambok (삼복) days, which are three distinct days of the lunar calendar—chobok (초복), jungbok (중복), and malbok (말복)—commonly among the hottest and most sultry summer days in Korea.

Some specialty restaurants in South Korea serve only samgyetang, having gained local popularity through their special recipes for the dish, which are often kept as secrets. The dish is sometimes accompanied by a small complimentary bottle of insam-ju (ginseng wine) in certain restaurants.

== Export ==
Samgye-tang is one of the Korean traditional foods exported to the United States. Harim, a South Korean poultry company, began exporting it in July 2014 after the U.S. added South Korea to its list of countries eligible to export poultry products, and said it was the first company in South Korea to export samgyetang to the United States. According to South Korean customs data, samgyetang exports to the United States rose from 487.1 tonnes in 2016 to 918.3 tonnes in 2025.

== Gallery ==
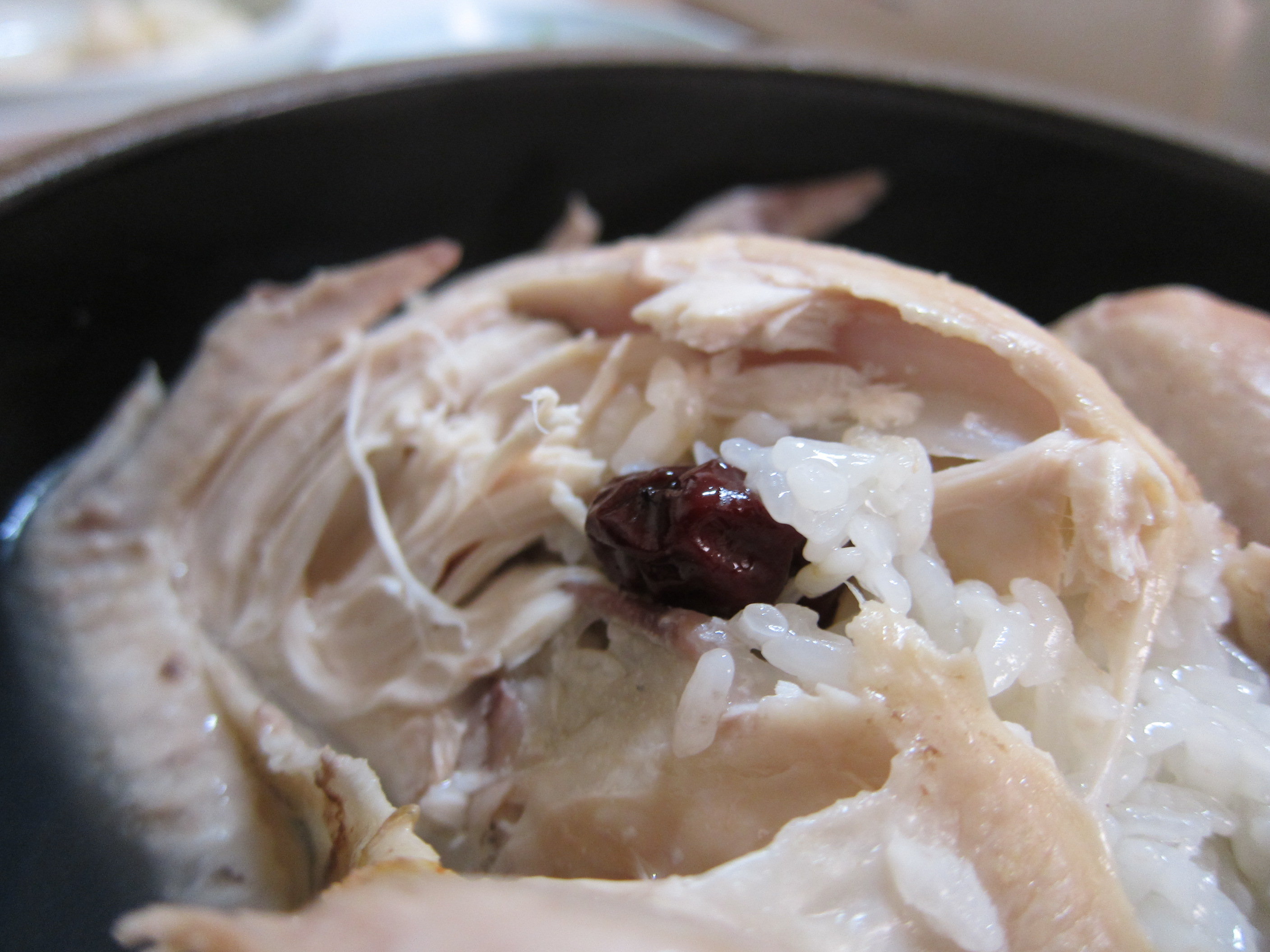
Samgye-tang (closeup)

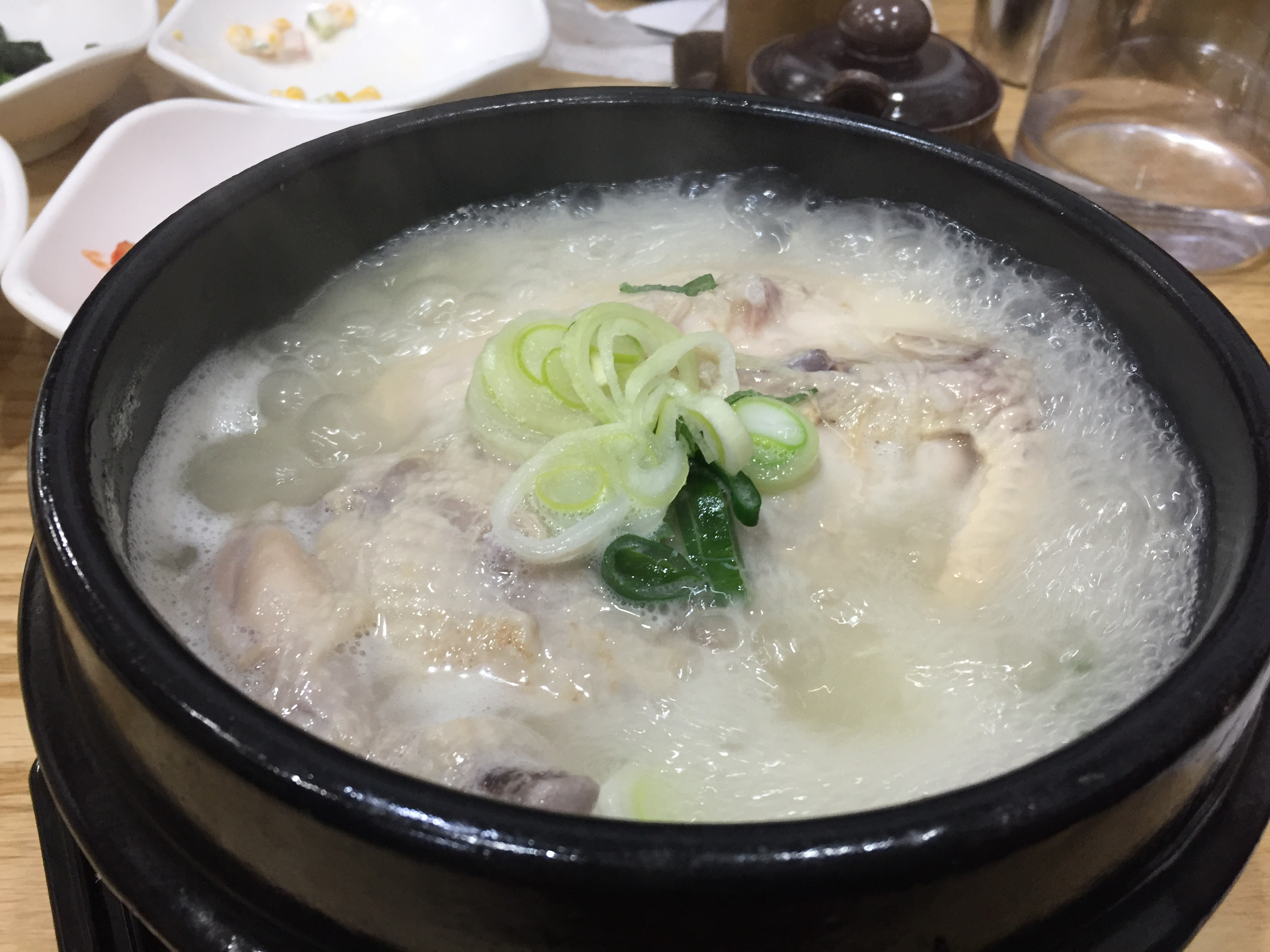
Samgyetang

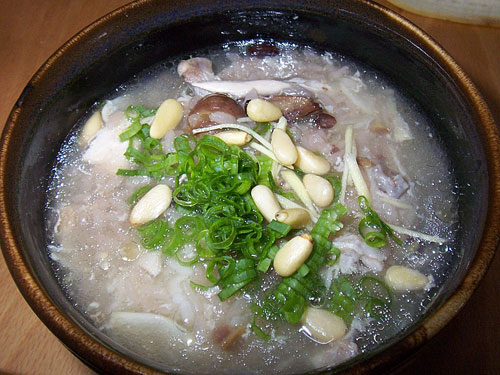
Samgyetang

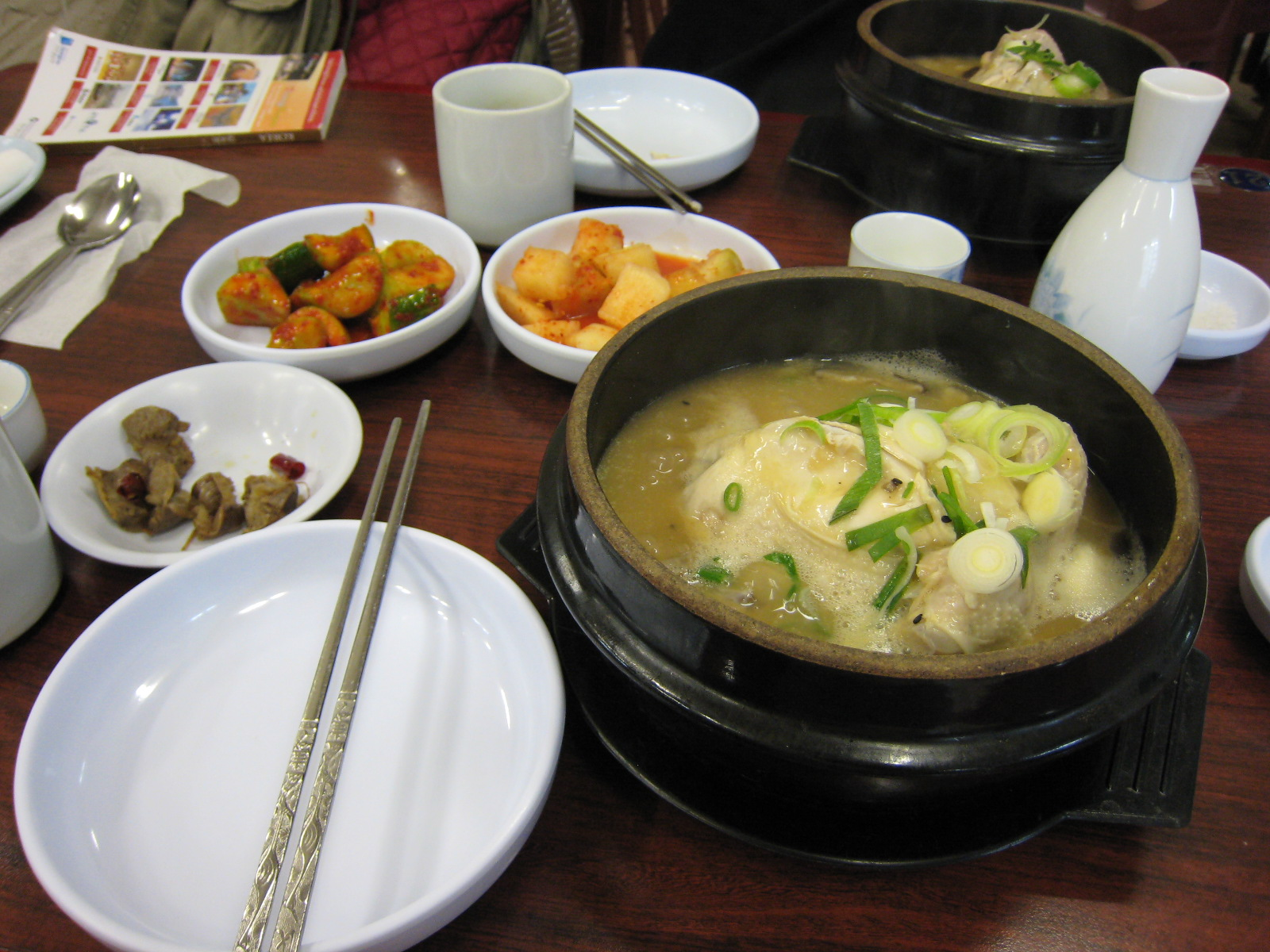
Samgyetang with kimchi and insam-ju (ginseng wine)

== See also ==
- Baeksuk
- Dak-bokkeum-tang
- Ori-tang
- List of chicken dishes
- List of soups
- List of Korean dishes
