= Ori-tang =

Korean duck stew

Oritang
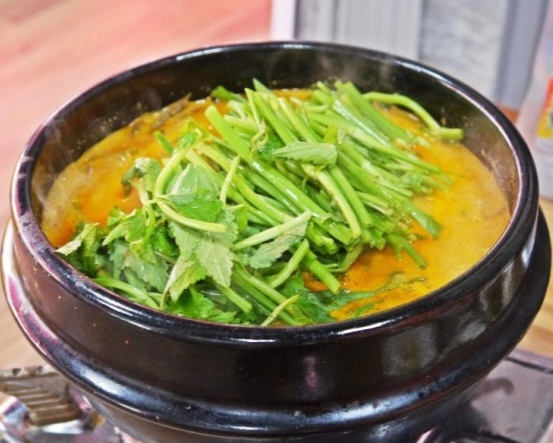
- Oritang
- Type: Guk
- Place of origin: Korea
- Main ingredients: Duck, vegetables

Korean name
- Hangul: 오리탕
- Hanja: 오리湯
- RR: oritang
- MR: orit'ang

Oritang (Korean: 오리탕) is a variety of guk, Korean soup or stew made by slowly simmering duck and various vegetables. Ori means "duck" and tang is another name for guk in Korean. While its recipe depends on region and taste, the soup is generally in a form of a clear soup. Some variants can contain chili pepper powder to make the soup spicy like maeuntang (spicy fish soup) or roasted perilla seeds to thicken the dish. Oritang is a local specialty of Gyeonggi Province and South Jeolla Province, especially Gwangju City. In Gwangju, about 20 restaurants specializing in oritang and other duck dishes are centered on Yudong Alley in Buk District.

== See also ==
- Samgyetang
- List of duck dishes
- List of soups
- Korean cuisine
- List of Korean dishes
