= Baeksuk =

Korean culinary term

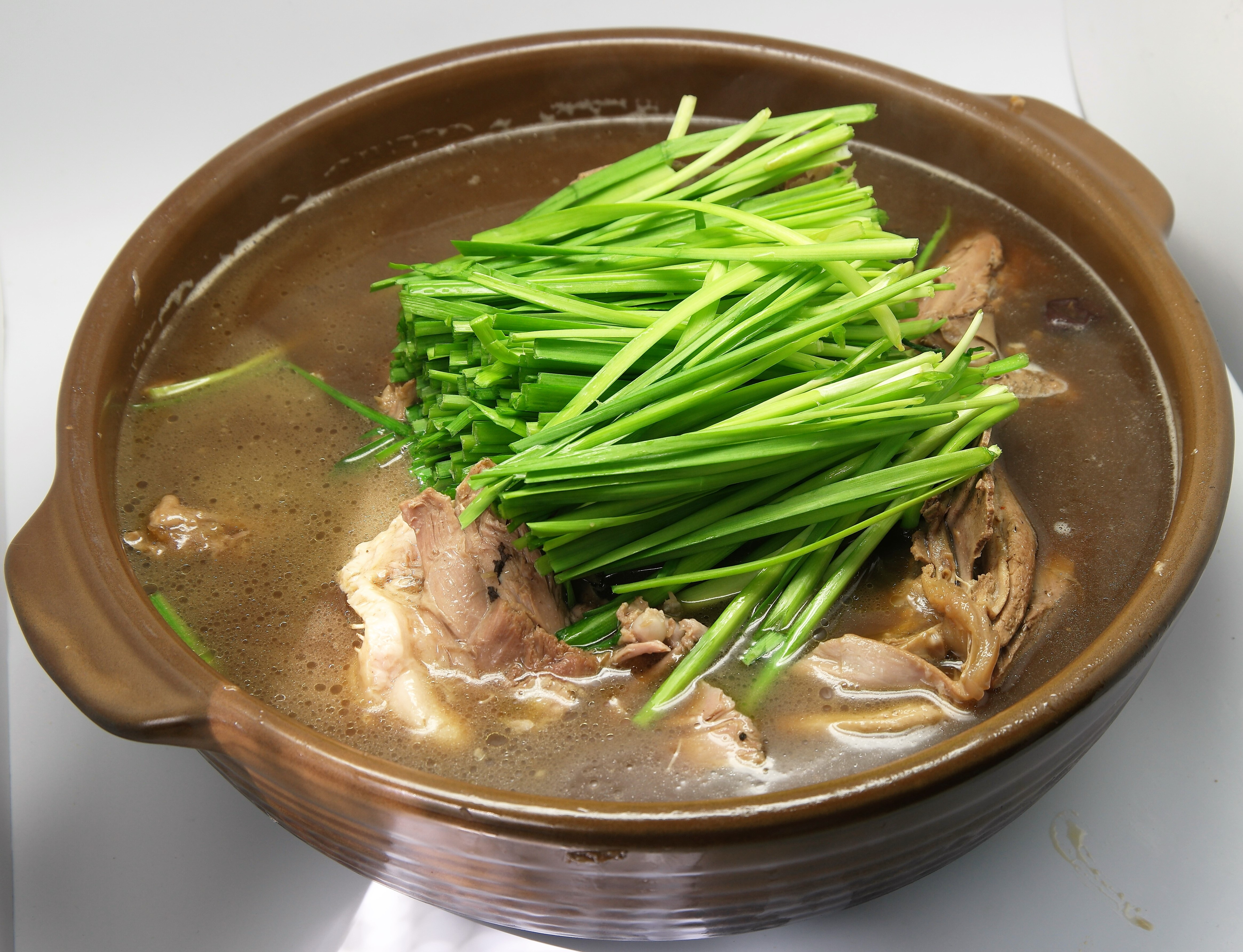
- Place of origin: Korea
- Main ingredients: Meat (including fish and poultry meat)

Korean name
- Hangul: 백숙
- Hanja: 白熟
- RR: baeksuk
- MR: paeksuk
- IPA: pɛ̝k̚.s͈uk̚

Baeksuk (Korean: 백숙; Hanja: 白熟) is a Korean culinary term referring to dishes made by boiling or steaming meat or fish to be cooked thoroughly without seasonings. Baeksuk is made with chicken or pheasant with plenty of water for several hours. However, the term generally indicates dakbaeksuk (닭백숙, chicken baeksuk), or chicken stew, whose recipe and ingredients are similar to samgyetang. While samgyetang is made with ginseng, various herbs, chestnuts, and jujubes, dakbaeksuk consists of simpler ingredients, such as chicken, water, and garlic. The chicken can be stuffed with glutinous rice.

When the cooking is finished, salt and sliced Welsh onions (daepa, 대파) are added to the diner's bowl according to taste. If the baesuk is not stuffed with glutinous rice, it is usually eaten with cooked rice. It is often seen as a simpler and cheaper variant of samgyetang. Sometimes it is mistakenly used as another word for samgyetang.
