= Duck soup noodles =

Type of food

- Alternative names: Duck leg noodles
- Type: Noodle
- Main ingredients: Noodles, duck meat, soup, herbs

Duck soup noodles or duck leg noodles (simplified Chinese: 鸭腿麺线; traditional Chinese: 鴨腿麵線; Pe̍h-ōe-jī: ah-thuí-mī-suànn; also spelt ak-twee-mee-sua) is a style of serving noodles. The dish consists of ingredients such as duck meat in hot soup with mixed herbs and noodles.

== See also ==
- Noodle soup
- Bee sua (mee sua)
