= List of oldest restaurants in South Korea =

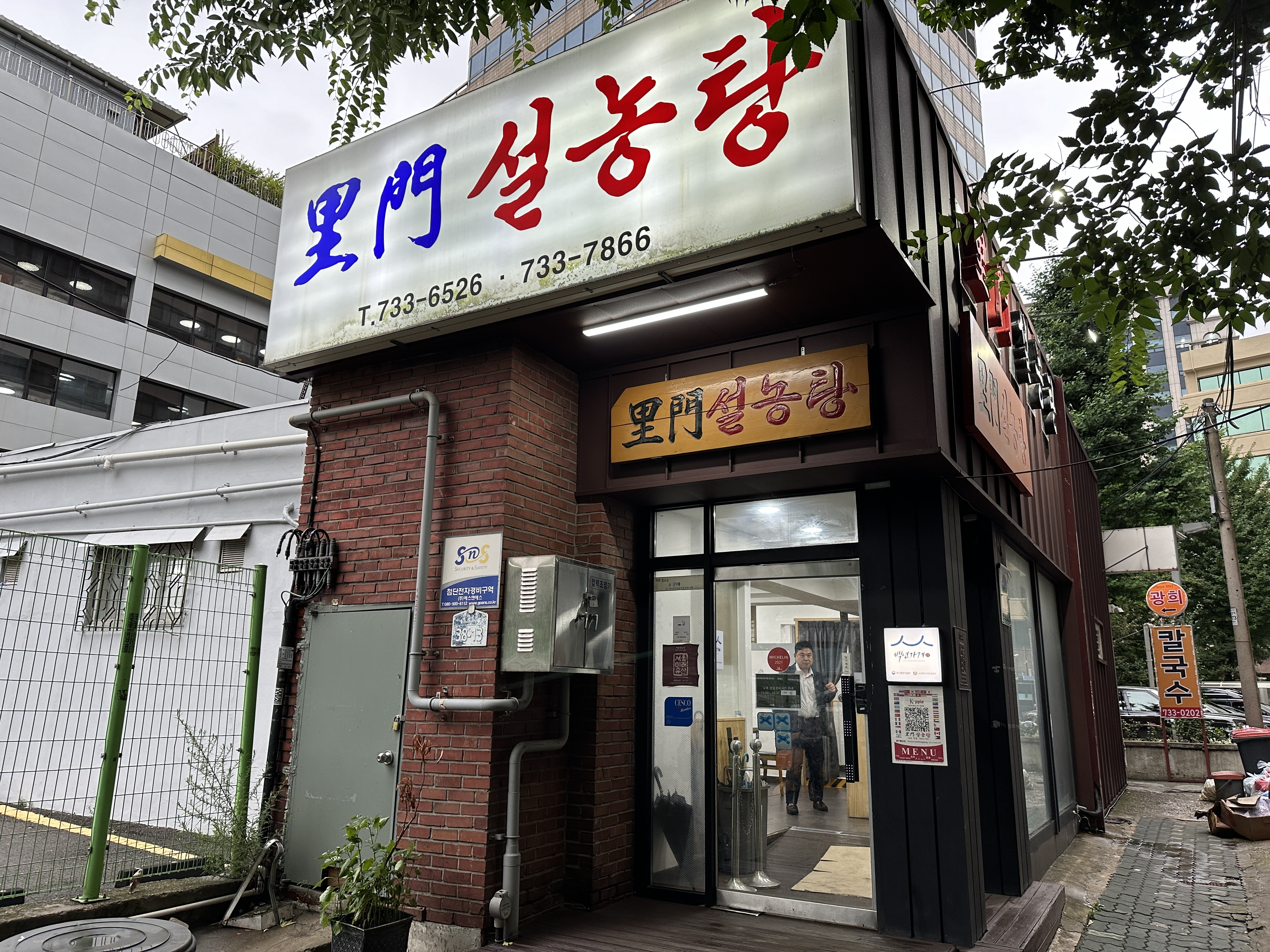
Imun Seolnongtang is the oldest operating restaurant in South Korea.

This is a list of the oldest active restaurants in South Korea. For inclusion in the list, the restaurant must be currently active and located within South Korea proper, with relative consensus on the founding date and continuity of the restaurant since its founding.

Few businesses are over 100 years old; this was possibly partly affected by the 1910–1945 Japanese colonial period and 1950–1953 Korean War.

== List ==
Established	Restaurant	Location	Cuisine/specialty	Ref
c. 1904 (Note: Date given by the Seoul Metropolitan Government; conflicting reports of start dates.)	Imun Seolnongtang	Seoul	Seolleongtang	
1905 (Note: Founded in Pyongyang, moved to Busan in 1953, then to Daegu in 1969.)	Busan Anmyeonok	Daegu	Pyongyang naengmyeon	
1910	Naju Gomtang Hayanjib	Naju, South Jeolla	Naju gomtang	
1915	Hwangsanok	Nonsan, South Chuncheong	Seafood	
1919 (Note: Founding date for restaurant's predecessor, which was founded in what became North Korea, relocated to South Korea in 1950 and restarted in 1953.)	Naeho Naengmyeon	Busan	Milmyeon, naengmyeon	
1920	Anilok	Anseong, Gyeonggi	Gukbap	
1924	Cheonil Sikdang	Haenam, South Jeolla	Hanjeongsik	
1924	Hamyangzip	Ulsan	Jinju bibimbap, hoe	
1925	Jinachun	Seoul	Korean Chinese cuisine	
1927	Cheonhwang Sikdang	Jinju, South Gyeongsang	Jinju bibimbap	
1930	Samdae Gwangyang Bulgogijip	Gwangyang, South Jeolla	Gwangyang bulgogi	
1932	Yonggeumok	Seoul	Chueo-tang	
1932	Eunhosikdang	Seoul	Kkori-gomtang	
1932	Sinsikdang	Damyang, South Jeolla	Tteok-galbi	
1933	Jaembaeok	Seoul	Seolleongtang	
1936	Yeonchun	Asan, South Chungcheong	Grilled eel	
1937	Cheongjinok	Seoul	Haejang-guk	
1939	Hadongkwan	Seoul	Gomguk	
1939	Hanilkwan	Seoul	Bulgogi, galbi	
1945	Pyeongyangok	Incheon	Haejang-guk	
1945	Bokhwaru	Incheon	Korean Chinese cuisine	
1945	Sunheungok	Seoul	Kkori-gomtang	
1946	Woo Lae Oak	Seoul	Pyongyang naengmyeon	
1947	Buyeojip	Seoul	Gomtang, seolleongtang	
1948	Andongjang	Seoul	Korean Chinese cuisine	
1949	Mapo Ok	Seoul	Seolleongtang	
1951	Sinbarwon	Busan	Dumplings	
1952	Samyang Dabang	Jeonju, North Jeolla	Coffeehouse (Note: Oldest active coffeehouse in South Korea)	
1952	Hankook Jib	Jeonju	Jeonju bibimbap	
1954 (Note: Oldest restaurant in Haeundae.)	Sinheunggwan	Busan	Korean Chinese cuisine	
1956	Hakrim Dabang	Seoul	Coffeehouse (Note: Oldest active coffeehouse in Seoul)	

== See also ==
- Oraegage – Designation for old stores in Seoul
- List of Michelin-starred restaurants in South Korea
- Leesungdang – oldest active bakery in South Korea
- Taegeukdang – historic bakery in Seoul
