= Eunhosikdang =

Historic restaurant in Seoul, South Korea

General information
- Coordinates: 37.5589°N 126.9770°E
- Designations

Seoul Future Heritage
- Reference no.: 2013-209

Restaurant information
- Established: 1932; 93 years ago
- Food type: Korean cuisine, kkori-gomtang
- Location: 28-4 Namdaemunsijang 4-gil, Jung District, Seoul, South Korea

Eunhosikdang (Korean: 은호식당) is a historic Korean restaurant in Jung District, Seoul, South Korea. It is the fourth oldest active restaurant in Seoul, having been founded in 1932. It specializes in the dish kkori-gomtang (oxtail soup). It is close to the Namdaemun area, near Namdaemun Market.

Customers reportedly wear gloves to pick up and eat the meat and bones from the kkori-gomtang. The meat can be dipped in a house sauce, and the soup has noodles in it. The restaurant also serves other dishes, such as yangji-tang (brisket soup) and seolleongtang.

The restaurant is reportedly the oldest in Jung District. It was founded in 1932 by Kim Eun-im (김은임) as a tent restaurant in Namdaemun Market. Eventually, she acquired a permanent space for the restaurant, which she dubbed Pyeonghwaok (평화옥); around this time she encountered Lee Myeong-sun (이명순), whom she would eventually adopt as her daughter and pass the restaurant onto. During the 1950–1953 Korean War, Kim fled to Busan and temporarily reopened the restaurant there. After Kim's return to Seoul, she eventually acquired a storefront for the restaurant, which she named Eunseongok (은성옥). After the 1968 Namdaemun Market fire, the restaurant reopened under the name Eunhosikdang. Amidst plans to redevelop the Namdaemun area, the restaurant opened two branches with the intent to move out of the Namdaemun area; this never ended up happening, so it maintained all three branches. The first branch opened in the Seosomun area in 2002, and the second in Yeouido in 2005. By 2019, it was reportedly run by the fourth generation of the same family. It first served haejang-guk (a dish said to cure hangovers). After government officials tried the kkori-gomtang, the dish became a hit in the store.

In 2013, it was made a Seoul Future Heritage.

== See also ==
- Naju Gomtang Hayanjib – another historic gomtang restaurant, in Naju
