= Sunheungok =

Historic restaurant in Seoul, South Korea

Restaurant information
- Established: 1945
- Location: 9 Euljiro 33-gil, Jongno District, Seoul, South Korea
- Other information

Seoul Future Heritage
- Reference no.: 2020-010

Sunheungok (Korean: 순흥옥; Hanja: 順興屋) is a historic Korean restaurant in Seoul, South Korea. It was founded in 1945, and has operated continually in the same spot since. Its name means "house of stability and prosperity". The restaurant specializes in the dish kkori-gomtang. It is a Seoul Future Heritage.

== See also ==
- List of oldest restaurants in South Korea
