= Jaembaeok =

Historic restaurant in Seoul, South Korea

Restaurant information
- Established: 1933; 92 years ago
- Food type: Korean cuisine, seolleongtang
- Location: 68-9 Sejong-daero 9-gil, Jung District, Seoul, South Korea
- Coordinates: 37.5625°N 126.9736°E

Jaembaeok (Korean: 잼배옥) is a historic Korean restaurant in Jung District, Seoul, South Korea. It is the fifth oldest active restaurant in Seoul, having opened in 1933. It specializes in the ox bone soup dish seolleongtang. The restaurant is one of relatively few seolleongtang restaurants in the city that survived the 1910–1945 Japanese colonial period and 1950–1953 Korean War.

According to the second-generation owner of the restaurant, the name of the restaurant comes from the phrase jabawi (자바위; 紫岩; lit. red rock), a name for the owner's home area in Do-dong. The pronunciation drifted to jambawi (잠바위), then to jaembae; ok (옥; 屋) means house. The restaurant reportedly has a soup gamasot (cauldron) that boils at all hours. The soup is continually added to in a similar manner to that of a perpetual stew. It also serves other dishes, such as doganitang, kkori-gomtang, and haejang-guk.

The restaurant first opened in 1933, near Seoul Station, by Kim Hee-jun. The exact founding date is reportedly uncertain; the founder recalled the date as either 1932 or 1933, and reported 1933 to be conservative. It was reportedly destroyed during the 1950–1953 Korean War. During the war, Kim fled Seoul and served other refugees food from a tent. Upon the 1953 ceasefire, Kim returned and resumed business in Namdaemun. In 1974, the store moved to its current location. In 1982, Kim died and passed the restaurant on to his son Kim Hyeon-min (김현민). The restaurant eventually passed to his grandson Kim Kyung-bae and granddaughter-in-law Yoon Kyung-sook.

== See also ==
- Imun Seolnongtang – the oldest restaurant in South Korea, also a seolleongtang restaurant
