= Buyeojip =

Restaurant in Seoul, South Korea

General information
- Coordinates: 37°31′27″N 126°53′32″E
- Designations

Seoul Future Heritage
- Reference no.: 2013-113

Restaurant information
- Established: 1947; 78 years ago
- Food type: Korean cuisine; gomguk; seolleongtang
- Location: 24 Seonyudong 1-ro, Yeongdeungpo District, Seoul, South Korea

Buyeojip (Korean: 부여집) is a historic restaurant in Dangsan-dong, Yeongdeungpo District, Seoul, South Korea. It opened in 1947 and specializes in the dishes gomtang and seolleongtang. The restaurant delivers and sells its soup around the country, and operates a branch restaurant in the Lotte World theme park.

== History ==
The same family has run the restaurant for three generations. The restaurant was renovated and reopened on 7 September 2020. It was made a Seoul Future Heritage in December 2014.
