= Pyeongyangok (Incheon) =

Restaurant in Incheon, South Korea

- Interactive map of Pyeongyangok

Restaurant information
- Established: 1945; 81 years ago
- Location: 68 Dowon-ro 8-gil, Jung District, Incheon, South Korea
- Coordinates: 37.4639°N 126.6398°E

Pyeongyangok (Korean: 평양옥; Hanja: 平壤屋) is a historic Korean restaurant in Incheon, South Korea. It specializes in the hangover soup dish haejang-guk. It first opened in 1945, and has remained a family business since. By 2023, it was on its third generation of owners.

The restaurant's founding family were from Pyongyang (now in North Korea). Before opening the restaurant, they had been operating a factory in Manchuria. Upon the liberation of Korea, their factory was confiscated and they moved to Incheon and established the restaurant. At some point, the original hanok-style building burnt down, and was replaced by a two-story building. The restaurant has reportedly acquired its meat from the same butchershop since its inception. Its haejang-guk is reportedly cooked for 18 hours, and its galbi-tang for over 10. The haejang-guk is reportedly only served before noon; the restaurant opens at 5 a.m., reportedly to cater to people who leave for work early in the morning.

== See also ==
- List of oldest restaurants in South Korea
