= Hanilkwan =

Historic restaurant chain in Seoul, South Korea

- Its post-2008 main location

General information
- Coordinates: 37.5277°N 127.0324°E
- Designations

Seoul Future Heritage
- Reference no.: 2013-281

Restaurant information
- Established: 1939; 86 years ago
- Food type: Korean cuisine, bulgogi
- Location: South Korea
- Website: www.hanilkwan.co.kr (in Korean)

Hanilkwan (Korean: 한일관; Hanja: 韓一館; RR: Hanilgwan; lit. Korea's best restaurant) is a historic Korean restaurant chain originally founded in Jongno District, Seoul, South Korea. It is the seventh-oldest active restaurant in Seoul, having opened in 1939. It specializes in the marinated meat dish bulgogi and the rib dish galbi.

The business is one of relatively few to have survived the Japanese colonial period, Korean War, and rapid economic development of South Korea. It has remained family-owned. It was listed on the Michelin Guide as a Bib Gourmand restaurant in 2017.

== Description ==
The restaurant serves mostly traditional Korean cuisine. It serves galbi, bulgogi, galbi-tang, naengmyeon, yukgaejang, and bibimbap. It also serves a number of side dishes (banchan).

== History ==
The restaurant first opened in 1939, during the 1910–1945 Japanese colonial period, under proprietess Shin U-gyeong (신우경). It initially had a Japanese-style name (in Korean: 화선옥; Hanja: 花仙屋; RR: Hwaseonok). Upon the 1945 liberation of Korea, the restaurant's name was changed to Hanilgwan. Upon the outbreak of the 1950–1953 Korean War, the restaurant's owner fled to Busan. There, the restaurant was temporarily reopened in Jungang-dong. Upon the July 1953 Korean Armistice Agreement, the restaurant moved back to Seoul and reopened on Jongno 1-ga. The restaurant did not always specialize in bulgogi; in the 1950s, an advertisement for it claimed its specialty was sukiyaki, a Japanese hot pot dish. One reporter examined photos of the food and likened it to neobiani, a popular dish in Joseon royal court cuisine.

Upon Shin's death, the restaurant passed to her daughter Gil Sun-jeong (길순정). Upon Gil's death, the restaurant went to her two daughters Kim Yi-suk (김이숙) and Kim Eun-suk (김은숙). In 1957, the restaurant moved into a three-story building. They invented their own heating plate for bulgogi, and began selling soup bulgogi (육수불고기; yuksu bulgogi). By the 1960s, it began expanding to a number of other branches, including one in Myeong-dong. It registered a trademark for its name in 1982. In 2008, amidst redevelopment in the Jongno area, it moved its main location to Apgujeong-dong in Gangnam District. It has since continued to open additional branches.

In 2013, it was named a Seoul Future Heritage for its historic value and quality.
