= Anilok =

Historic restaurant in Anseong, South Korea

Restaurant information
- Established: c. 1920
- Food type: Korean cuisine, seolleongtang, gukbap, galbi-tang
- Location: 20 Jungang-ro 411beon-gil, Anseong, Gyeonggi Province, South Korea
- Coordinates: 37.0074°N 127.2727°E
- Website: sally.365food.com (in Korean)

Anilok (Korean: 안일옥; Hanja: 安一屋) is a historic Korean restaurant in Anseong, South Korea. It was established around 1920, making it one of the oldest active restaurants in South Korea. It specializes in the beef soup dish seolleongtang, and is among the oldest gukbap restaurants in Gyeonggi Province.

== Description ==
The store reportedly has three gamasot cauldrons that are cooking at all hours. One pot is for making seolleongtang, another is for gukbap, and the last is for galbi-tang. The pots are periodically emptied, and the broth remade with new ingredients.

== History ==
The restaurant first opened around 1920 by Lee Seung-rye (이승례), the grandmother of the current owner. At that time, Lee's husband, who was in his early 40s, became sick. To raise money, she sold gukbap at the local marketplace, using meat she obtained at the nearby cow marketplace. The dish was often improvized, based on whatever ingredients she could access; as such she called it utang (우탕; 牛湯; lit. cow stew). Lee reportedly spent significant time each day trying to acquire ingredients for the soup from various butchershops. In 1937, nineteen-year-old Lee Yanggwibi (이양귀비) married a son of Lee Seung-rye, and began helping her mother-in-law with the business. Other members of the family also contributed to its operation; the men carried wood and performed labor. Just before the outbreak of the 1950–1953 Korean War, Lee Yanggwibi took over the business. Sales reportedly actually improved during the war, as refugees frequented the business. By 1952, they were able to purchase a restaurant building in a central location.

Even until after the Korean War, the business was reportedly nameless. When they tried to apply for a business license at a government office, they were reportedly asked "how can you do business without a business name?" (상호 없이 어떻게 장사하느냐), and the office worker came up with the name Anilok on the spot. The name literally means "An[seong] one store", and is interpreted as "the most relaxing business in Anseong" (안성에서 제일 가는 편안한 가게).

In 1997, third generation owner Kim Jong-yeol (김종열) took over the business. In 2021, it was reported that Kim's son Kim Hyeong-u (김형우) was planning to take over the business next.

The restaurant was featured in the television program Baek Jong-won's Top 3 Chef King.
