= Hadongkwan =

Historic restaurant in Seoul, South Korea

- Interactive map of Hadongkwan

Restaurant information
- Established: 1939; 87 years ago
- Food type: Korean cuisine, gomguk
- Location: 12 Myeongdong 9-gil, Jung District, Seoul, 04538, South Korea
- Coordinates: 37.5643°N 126.9849°E
- Website: www.hadongkwan.co.kr (in Korean)

Hadongkwan (Korean: 하동관; Hanja: 河東館; RR: Hadonggwan) is a historic Korean restaurant in Myeong-dong, Jung District, Seoul, South Korea. The restaurant was founded in 1939, and specializes in the ox bone soup dish gomtang. It is currently listed on the Michelin Guide as a Bib Gourmand restaurant. It is reportedly only open for lunch time, and closes whenever it runs out of food.

The restaurant was founded by Ryu Chang-hui (류창희), the daughter of a wealthy family in Seoul. She handed the restaurant off to her friend's daughter-in-law, who in turn passed the restaurant onto Kim Hui-yeong (김희영) in 1968. Kim was reportedly preparing to hand the restaurant onto her daughter by 2008. The restaurant was originally located in Sunhwa-dong, but moved to Myeong-dong in June 2007.

The restaurant reportedly frequently has famous customers. It was reportedly favored by South Korean leader Park Chung Hee and his wife Yuk Young-soo. According to the restaurant's owner, every South Korean president except for Roh Moo-hyun and Lee Myung-bak dined at the restaurant. The restaurant owners reportedly intentionally avoid opening more locations or franchising, in order to avoid diluting the taste or service.

The restaurant was recognized by the Seoul Metropolitan Government as an "Oraegage", or a "Seoul Historical Store". The designation recognizes long-running businesses and provides resources to keep them in operation.

== See also ==
- List of oldest restaurants in South Korea
