= Samdae Gwangyang Bulgogijip =

Restaurant in Gwangyang, South Korea

Restaurant information
- Established: 1930; 95 years ago
- Food type: Korean cuisine, Gwangyang bulgogi
- Coordinates: 34.9701°N 127.5788°E
- Website: 삼대광양불고기집.kr (in Korean)

Samdae Gwangyang Bulgogijip (Korean: 삼대광양불고기집) is a Korean barbecue restaurant in Gwangyang, South Korea. It specializes in a variant of the barbecue dish bulgogi it invented, which it calls Gwangyang bulgogi. The restaurant is a family business that was founded in 1930; it is currently run by its third generation of owners.

The restaurant was founded as Ilheung Sikdang (일흥식당) by Lee So-eun (이소은). The restaurant did not develop Gwangyang bulgogi until its second generation of owners. Its second generation changed the restaurant's name to Gwangyang Bulgogi Sikdang (광양불고기식당). In the 1970s, the restaurant became popular among Japanese tourists. The third generation owner changed the restaurant's name to its current form. After the restaurant developed the dish, other local restaurants began adopting it; eventually it became a dish strongly associated with Gwangyang.

Unlike the Seoul style of bulgogi, which has soup, Gwangyang bulgogi is grilled on a copper pan over charcoals.

== See also ==
- List of oldest restaurants in South Korea
