= Hankook Jib =

Restaurant in Jeonju, South Korea

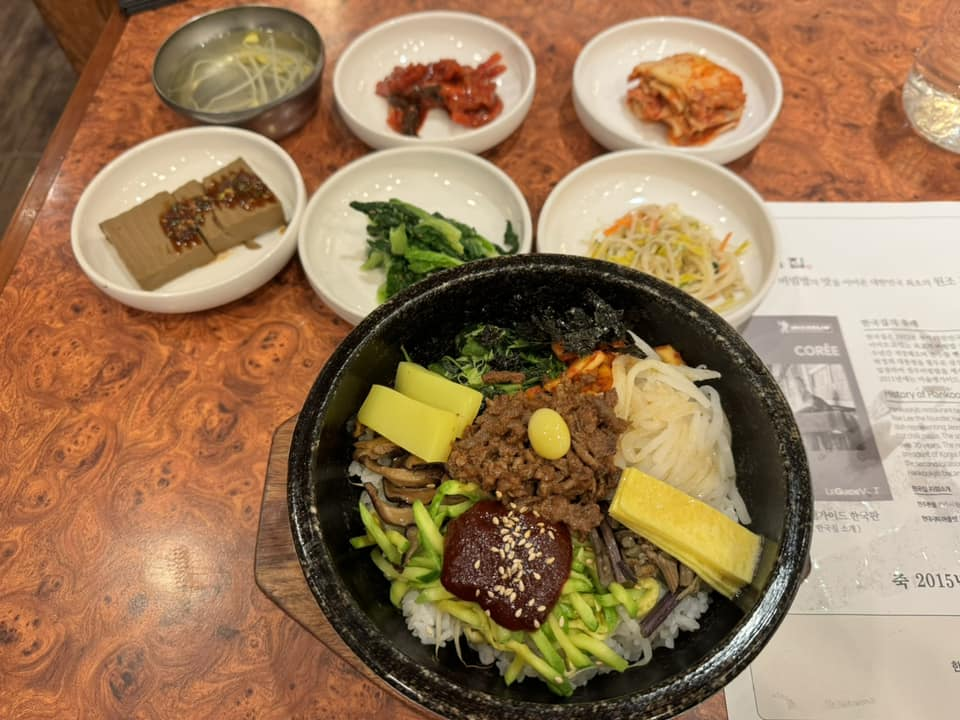
- Food served in the restaurant (2024)

Restaurant information
- Established: 1952; 73 years ago
- Food type: Korean cuisine, Jeonju bibimbap
- Location: 119 Eojin-gil, Wansan District, Jeonju, North Jeolla Province, South Korea
- Coordinates: 35.8165°N 127.1482°E

Hankook Jib (Korean: 한국집; RR: Hangukjip) is a Korean restaurant in Jeon-dong, Wansan District, Jeonju, South Korea. It opened in 1952 and has remained a family business; by the 2010s it was on its third generation of owners. It specializes in and is the oldest specialty restaurant for Jeonju bibimbap.

It has a branch in Seoul, in the Lotte World Mall. The restaurant reportedly makes its own sesame oil, gochujang, and soy sauce. It appeared in the Michelin Guide in 2011.

== See also ==
- List of oldest restaurants in South Korea
