= Oxtail stews in French cuisine =

Oxtail (queue de Bœuf) stews are found in various forms in French cuisine. Auguste Escoffier and others have published several recipes:

French	English	Contents	Ref
À l'alsacienne	Alsace style	Chopped into sections and braised; when cold, breadcrumbed, fried and served with choucroute (sauerkraut).	
À l'auvergnate	Auvergne style	Braised in white wine, with: lean bacon, chestnuts cooked in consommé and glazed, and small onions cooked in butter.	
À l'ancienne	Old fashioned style	Cut in pieces and stewed; when cold, dipped in egg and breadcrumbs, deep fried; served with choucroute, purée of green peas or potato purée and sometimes (see	
À la Cavour	Cavour style	Braised in brown stock with mushrooms; served with chestnut purée.	
À la charolaise	Charolais style	Steamed, defatted, reduced, bound with Espagnole sauce and simmered. Served with pommes duchesse and bacon.	
Chipolata	Chipolata	Similar to Cavour style, but with the addition of button onions, carrots, chestnuts and fried chipolata sausages.	
Clair	Clear	Chopped and browned in an oven with vegetables, moistened with white consommé and Madeira.	
Farcie	Stuffed	The tail bone is removed, and the tail stuffed with lean beef and fatty bacon, mixed with breadcrumbs soaked in milk, eggs, and truffle peelings. The tail is then sewn up and gently simmered.	
Grillée	Grilled	Slowly grilled and served with a vegetable purée or sauce Robert.	
En hochepot	Hotpot	Gently simmered with pigs' trotters and ear, cabbage, onions, carrots and turnips. Served with grilled chipolatas, slices of the pig's ear and a timbale of mashed potato.	
Aux légumes	With vegetables	Browned, mirepoix added, sprinkled with flour, moistened with brown stock and braised with carrots, turnips, celery and cooked diced bacon. Flavoured with Madeira before serving.	
À la Nohant	Nohant style	Braised as for "à la Cavour", glazedand served with lamb sweetbreads and tongues.	
Aux olives noires	With black olives	Braised in white wine and brandy, with orange zest and black olives.	
À la purée de racines	With root vegetable purée	Braised and served covered in a purée of root vegetables including carrots and onions.	
À la Sainte-Menehould	Sainte-Menehould style	Braised and then breacrumbed and coloured either under a grill or in an oven.	
Vinaigrette	Vinaigrette	Cut in pieces, boiled; vinaigrette sauce served separately.	

== Sources ==
- Bickel, Walter (1989). Hering's Dictionary of Classical and Modern Cookery (eleventh ed.). London: Virtue. ISBN 978-3-8057-0307-9.
- Carroll, Anthony (2009). Mijoteuse. Montreal: Modus Vivendi. ISBN 978-2-89-523610-8.
- Escoffier, Auguste (1903). Le Guide culinaire, aide-mémoire de cuisine pratique (in French). Paris: Bibliothèque Professionelle. OCLC 970757923.
- Saulnier, Louis (1978) [1923]. Le Répertoire de la cuisine (fourteenth ed.). London: Jaeggi. OCLC 1086737491.
- Viard, André (1812). Le Cuisinier impérial (in French). Paris: Chez Barba. OCLC 969512025.
