= Yonggeumok =

Historic restaurant in Seoul, South Korea

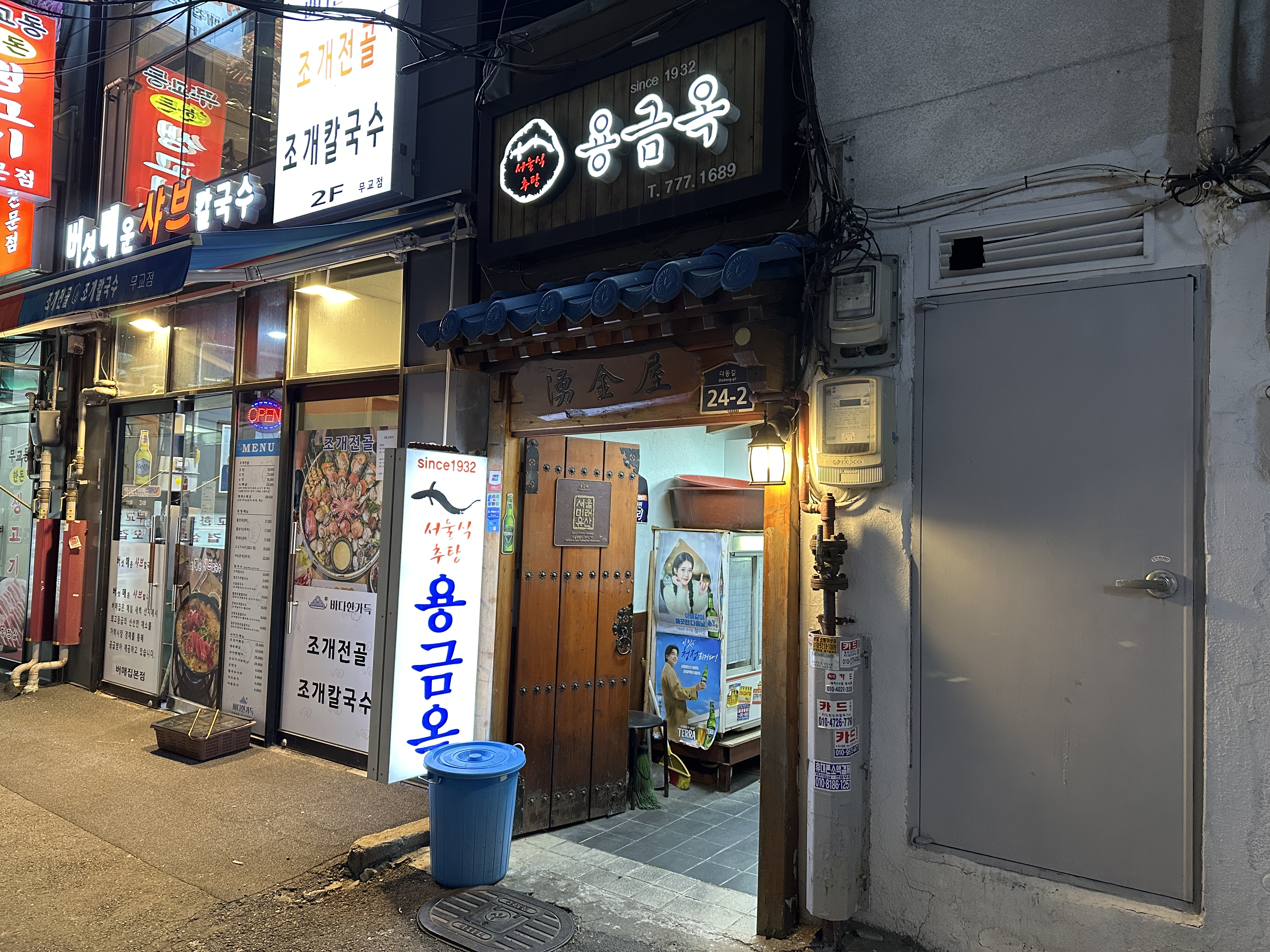
- The restaurant (2025)

Restaurant information
- Established: 1932; 93 years ago
- Food type: Korean cuisine, chueo-tang
- Rating: Bib Gourmand
- Location: 24-2 Dadong-gil, Jung District, Seoul, South Korea
- Coordinates: 37.5675°N 126.9805°E
- Other locations: Second location in Tongin-dong
- Other information

Seoul Future Heritage
- Reference no.: 2013-195
- Website: yonggeumok.modoo.at (for the Tongin location; in Korean)

Yonggeumok (Korean: 용금옥; Hanja: 湧金屋; lit. house of flowing gold) is a historic Korean restaurant chain in Seoul, South Korea. It is among the oldest active restaurants in South Korea and is the third oldest operating restaurant in Seoul, having first opened in 1932, and specializes in the pond loach soup dish chueo-tang. The restaurant has been operated by three generations of the same family since its founding. It has two branches: one in Da-dong, Jung District, and another in Tongin-dong. The Da-dong location is the older of the two. The restaurant has become a famous tourist attraction. It is listed on the Michelin Guide as a Bib Gourmand restaurant. In 2013, it was made a Seoul Future Heritage.

== Description ==
Yonggeumok means "house of flowing gold", apparently referencing a wish for the store to be profitable. It is commonly believed that the restaurant was initially nameless and was given its name by a patron, possibly the poet Byeon Yeong-ro.

The restaurant serves Seoul-style chueo-tang which the restaurant calls chu-tang (추탕; 鰍湯), an archaic name for the dish. The Seoul-style, little known even to Seoul residents, is made from boiled beef broth, red pepper flakes, tofu, tofu skin, mushroom, noodles, and pond loaches. The bones of the fish are small and soft; the fish are meant to be eaten whole. Other restaurants typically serve chueo-tang that has been grounded into a paste; the Seoul-style began because historical customers wanted to be sure that the fish were authentic, and the practice stuck. The soup is served with a generous portion of scallions. This style was popular until the 1950s.

The two locations serve mostly identical food, although the Da-dong location uses tripe in the broth and the Tongin-dong location uses beef bones. Tripe is closer to the original practice. The two branches are operated relatively separately.

== History ==
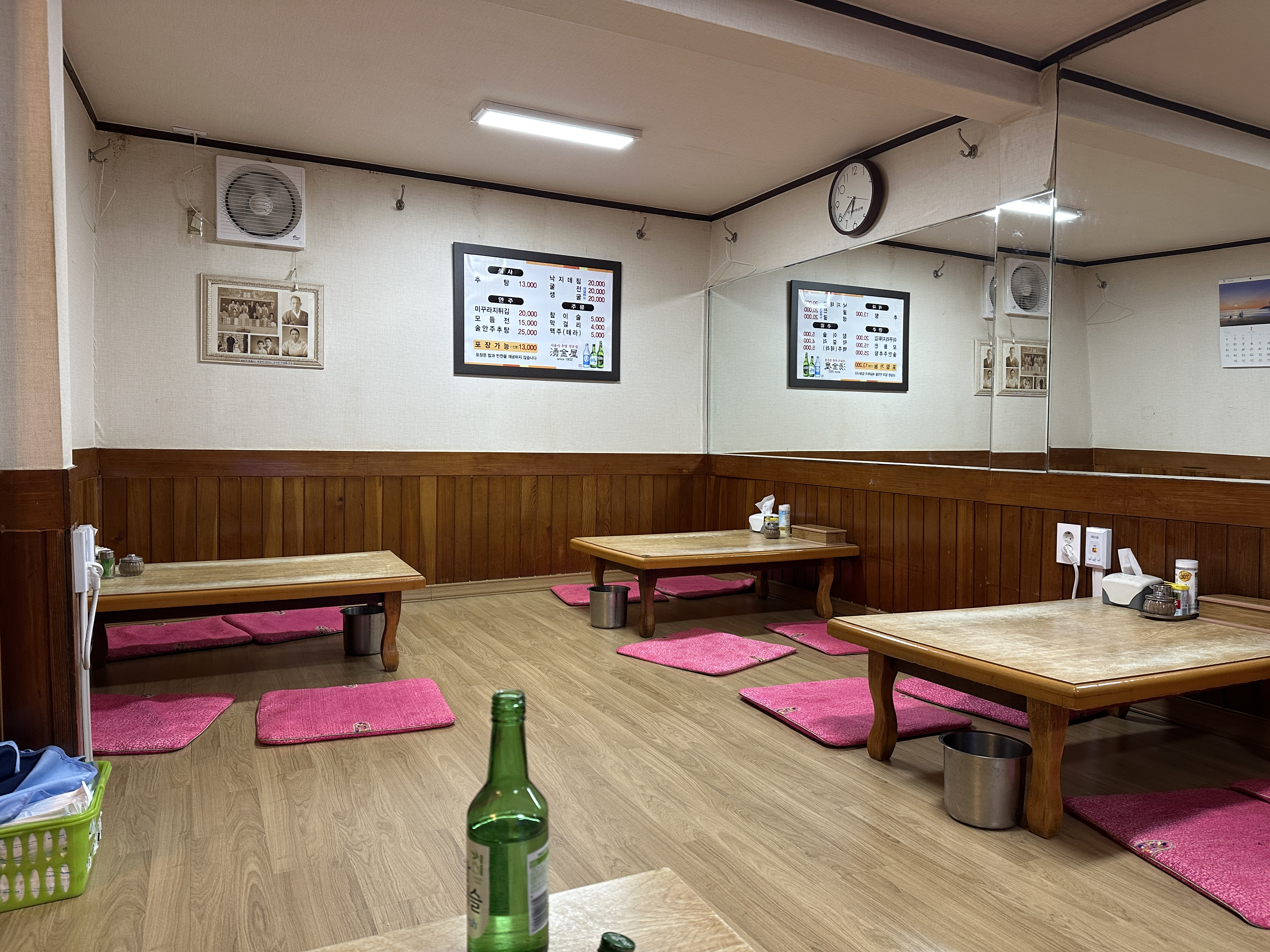
Interior of the restaurant (2025)

The restaurant was founded in 1932 by Hong Gi-nyeo (홍기녀), then a newlywed in her early 20s. She was married to Shin Seok-sung (신석숭). It was located in what is now Mugyo-dong (the original location is now a building called The Exchange Seoul; 더익스체인지서울). The business was founded during the 1910–1945 Japanese colonial period. Around the time of the restaurant's founding, there was a significant number of loaches in the nearby stream Cheonggyecheon. The restaurant quickly became popular, and Hong became reputed as an excellent cook. In its heyday, the restaurant was around 100 pyeong (330 m^{2}) in size. In 1960, the restaurant closed due to financial hardship and the redevelopment of the area. After receiving numerous inquiries from former customers, the restaurant began operating out of what is now its current Da-dong location: a traditional hanok-style (traditional Korean architecture style) house of around 23 pyeong (76 m^{2}) that was once used as a resting place for the restaurant's employees. The two locations are around 100 m (330 ft) away from each other. After Hong died in 1982, the business went into the hands of her youngest daughter-in-law, Han Jeong-ja (한정자). Around 1997, Han opened another branch of the restaurant first in Mugyo-dong; this branch then moved to Tongin-dong ten years later. The Da-dong location is run by the founder's grandson Shin Dong-min (신동민). Shin Dong-min quit his job at a construction company in order to keep the business going.

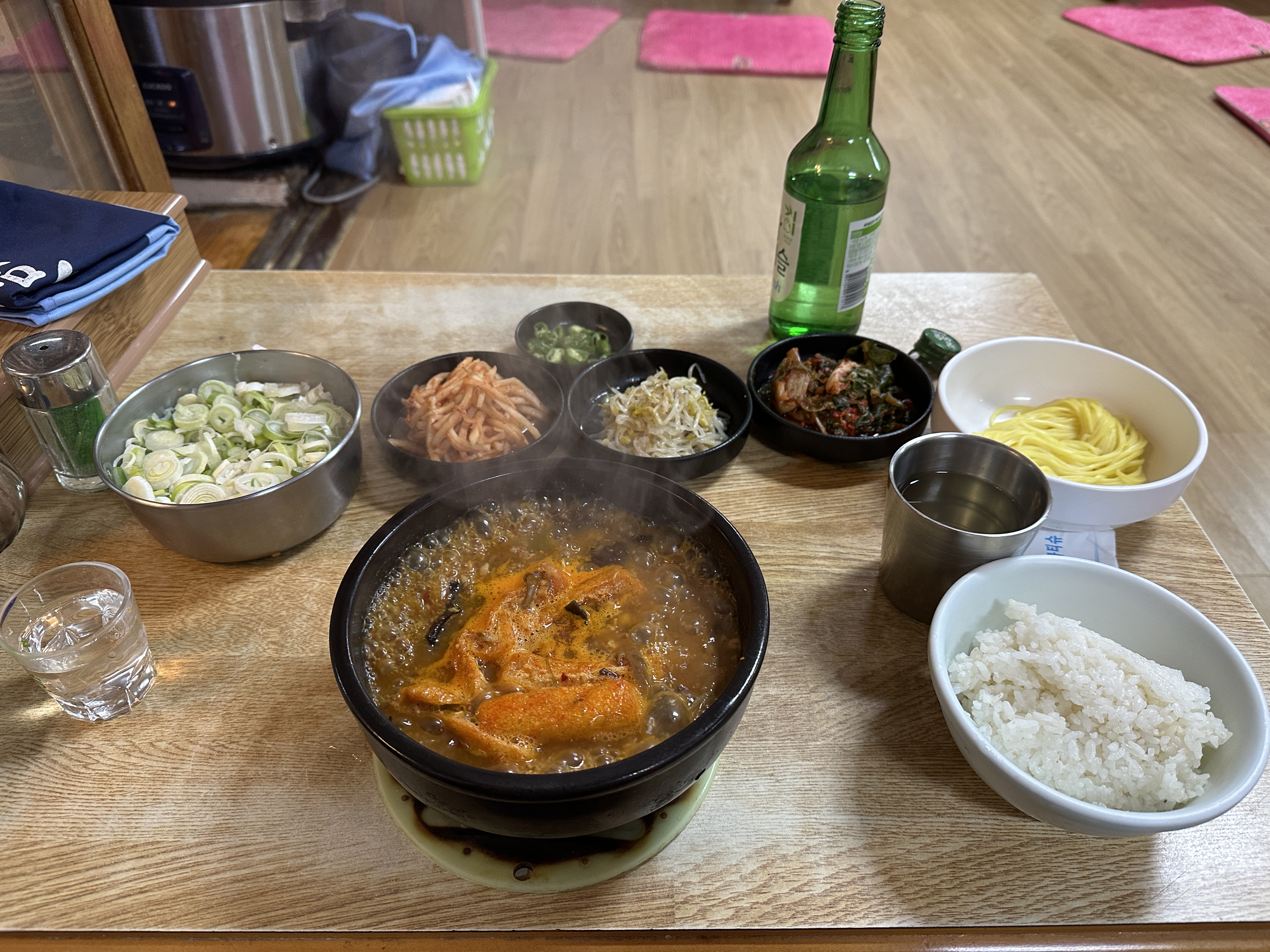
Chueo-tang served in the restaurant (front, black bowl), 2025

The restaurant's location in downtown Seoul meant that it served a number of prominent people in Korean history. Various newspaper articles in the venue showcase the people who visited over time. There is a story of uncertain veracity that the founding leader of North Korea Kim Il Sung's younger brother Kim Yong-ju ate in the restaurant after returning to Seoul from China. In 1953, during ceasefire negotiations in the Korean War, an interpreter for Kim Il Sung asked if the restaurant was still around. In 1973, during a North–South Korea conference, North Korean representative Pak Song-chol asked if Yonggeumok was still in business. In 1990, the North Korean Prime Minister Yon Hyong-muk ate in the restaurant twice during a visit to Seoul. Former Speaker of the National Assembly of South Korea Lee Man-seop was a fan of the restaurant; a photo of him is in the store. President Moon Jae-in symbolically had Yonggeumok chueo-tang served at the presidential residence Blue House at an event for trade unions in 2017; the dish has long been seen as one of the working class.

The business's location was made a Seoul Future Heritage in 2013. Some of its regulars have been visiting for many decades; one regular interviewed in 2020 reported to have been consistently visiting since the 1960s.

In 2018, it was reported that both locations had potential successors from the family lined up. One owner acknowledged that the business was not lucrative and had a moderate customer base, and that their goal was to keep it running in the family for as long as possible. The business was severely impacted by the COVID-19 pandemic. Before the pandemic, it had around 200 customers per day; this number around halved. Furthermore, around 2022, Da-dong was experiencing significant redevelopment, and the restaurant's owner worried that their building would be reconstructed.

== See also ==
- Imun Seolnongtang – The oldest operating restaurant in Seoul and South Korea
