= Hwangsanok =

Restaurant in Nonsan, South Korea

Restaurant information
- Established: 1915; 110 years ago
- Food type: Korean cuisine, seafood
- Location: 81-16 Hwangsan-ri, Ganggyeong-eup, Nonsan, South Chungcheong Province, South Korea
- Coordinates: 36.1564°N 127.0093°E

Hwangsanok (Korean: 황산옥) is a historic seafood restaurant in Nonsan, South Korea. It is among the oldest active restaurants in South Korea, having been founded in 1915. It has remained a family business, and by 2019 was on its third generation of owners.

The restaurant was founded by Han Man-rye (한만례). It began as a small restaurant for people waiting for a ferry. The restaurant owner served maeun-tang from Amur catfish (메기; megi) caught in the nearby river. In 1955, the restaurant was passed onto the second generation. In 1987, South Korean president Chun Doo-hwan reportedly ate at the restaurant. The restaurant offers several dishes that use pufferfish.
