= Mapo Ok =

Korean restaurant in Seoul, South Korea

Restaurant information
- Established: 1949; 76 years ago
- Food type: Korean cuisine, seolleongtang
- Location: 312 Tojeong-ro, Mapo District, Seoul, South Korea
- Coordinates: 37.5399°N 126.9432°E

Mapo Ok (Korean: 마포옥; RR: Mapook) is a historic Korean restaurant in Mapo District, Seoul, South Korea. The restaurant first opened in 1949, and specializes in the beef soup dish seolleongtang. Since 2020, the restaurant has been listed on the Michelin Guide as a Bib Gourmand restaurant. In 2022, the restaurant was selected as one of the top 100 best restaurants in Seoul by the Seoul Metropolitan Government. The restaurant has also featured on South Korean television.

== See also ==
- List of Korean restaurants
