= Busan Anmyeonok =

Historic restaurant in Daegu, South Korea

Restaurant information
- Established: 1905; 120 years ago
- Food type: Korean cuisine, Pyongyang naengmyeon
- Location: 4 Gukchaebosang-ro 125-gil, Jung District, Daegu, South Korea
- Coordinates: 35.8706°N 128.5989°E

Busan Anmyeonok (Korean: 부산안면옥) is a historic Pyongyang naengmyeon restaurant in Daegu, South Korea. It is among the oldest operating restaurants in South Korea, having first opened in 1905 in Pyongyang during the Korean Empire period, then moved to Busan, South Korea in 1953, then moved to Daegu in 1969. The restaurant is reportedly open for half the year, from April to late September. It has been owned by the same family since its founding, and by 2018 was on its fourth generation of owners.

The restaurant was founded by An Jin-hyeong (안진형). An's son An Mok-cheon (안목천) fled to Busan in 1952 (during the 1950–1953 Korean War) and restarted the restaurant there. An Jin-hyeong's son-in-law Bang Su-yeong (방수영) opened Busan Anmyeonok in Daegu in 1969. By 2021, Bang's son was running the restaurant.

In 2021, the restaurant had seating for 176 people. It reportedly uses pure buckwheat for its regular naengmyeon, and buckwheat mixed with potato starch for its bibim-naengmyeon to achieve a chewier texture. The restaurant also serves other foods as well, including braised beef and pork, bulgogi, and mandu-guk.

The restaurant has been featured on various television programs.

== See also ==
- List of oldest restaurants in South Korea
