= Yeonchun =

Historic restaurant in Asan, South Korea

Restaurant information
- Established: 1936; 89 years ago
- Food type: Korean cuisine, grilled eel
- Location: 67 Sinjeongho-gil, Asan, South Chungcheong Province, South Korea
- Coordinates: 36.7757°N 126.9762°E

Yeonchun (Korean: 연춘; Hanja: 戀春) is a historic restaurant in Asan, South Korea. It has been operating since 1936, and has been run by the same family since its founding. It specializes in grilled eel. One 2012 book evaluated it as the 18th oldest operating restaurant in South Korea.

The restaurant was initially founded as Gwangheungru (광흥루). It initially focused on Korean cuisine as a whole. After the 1945 liberation of Korea, it began specializing in grilled eel. This was in part motivated by the numerous eels in the nearby Sinjeong Lake. The restaurant changed names to "Yeongchun" in 1957, then received its current name in 1976.

The restaurant was reportedly visited by South Korean presidents Park Chung Hee and Kim Young-sam.

== See also ==
- List of oldest restaurants in South Korea
