= Bokhwaru =

Chinese restaurant in Incheon, South Korea

Restaurant information
- Established: 1945; 80 years ago
- Food type: Korean Chinese cuisine
- Location: 16 Bupyeong-daero 32beon-gil, Bupyeong District, Incheon, South Korea
- Coordinates: 37.4943°N 126.7240°E

Bokhwaru (Korean: 복화루; Chinese: 福華樓; pinyin: Fúhuálóu) is a historic Korean Chinese restaurant in Incheon, South Korea. It opened in 1945 and has remained a family business since then. By 2020, it was operated by the son of the founder. The restaurant has reportedly been recognized by the Blue Ribbon Survey three times.

The restaurant was founded by Lee Bok-chung (이복충; Korean name, Chinese name not given), a Chinese immigrant from Shandong, China. He arrived in Korea during the late Japanese colonial period, in 1939, and initially worked as a trader. In 1942, he arrived in Incheon. He set up shop within Bupyeong Market, which was then bustling with activity due to nearby Japanese military factories. The restaurant moved to its current location in 1947. Lee's son was born in Incheon, and eventually took over the business; by 2018 he was over 70 years old and preparing to hand of the restaurant to the next generation.

== See also ==
- List of oldest restaurants in South Korea
