= Hamyangzip =

Restaurant in Ulsan, South Korea

Restaurant information
- Established: 1924; 101 years ago
- Food type: Korean cuisine
- Location: 19 Samsan-ro 228-beongil, Nam District, Ulsan, South Korea
- Coordinates: 35.5427°N 129.3386°E

Hamyangzip (Korean: 함양집; RR: Hamyangjip) is a historic Korean restaurant in Ulsan, South Korea. It is among the oldest active restaurants in South Korea, having been founded in 1924. It has remained a family business since, and is currently on its fourth generation of owners.

The restaurant was founded in 1924 by Kang Bun-nam (강분남) as Hamyanggwan (함양관). The restaurant's founder would go on to live until the age of 104, and oversaw much of the restaurant's early history. From 1946, its second generation owner was An Suk-hui (안숙희). From 1969, its third generation was Yun Ju-bong (윤주봉) and Hwang Hwa-seon (황화선). From 1995, its fourth and current generation is Yun Jeong-a (윤정아) and Lee Jun-seung (이준승). The extended family also operates various branches of the restaurant. At one point, the restaurant went by the name Gugujip (구구집).

The restaurant serves a variety of dishes from Korean cuisine, including Jinju bibimbap, hoe (raw meat), bulgogi, and more. Its menu has changed over time, to adapt to tastes and ingredients, and depending on the preferences of the current owner.
