= Yukgaejang =

Korean spicy beef soup

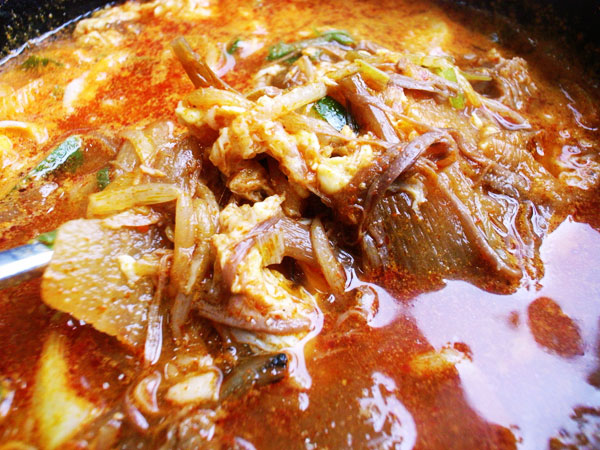
- Alternative names: Spicy beef soup
- Type: Guk
- Place of origin: Korea
- Serving temperature: Hot
- Main ingredients: Beef

Korean name
- Hangul: 육개장
- Hanja: 肉개醬
- RR: yukgaejang
- MR: yukkaejang
- IPA: [juk̚.k͈ɛ̝.dʑaŋ]

Yukgaejang (Korean: 육개장) or spicy beef soup is a spicy Korean soup made from shredded beef with scallions and other ingredients, which are simmered together for a long time. It is a variety of gomguk, or bone soup, which was formerly served in Korean royal court cuisine. It is thought to be healthful and is popular due to its hot and spicy nature.

Also, yukgaejang was eaten mainly by people who were tired of the midsummer heat to take care of themselves.

In addition to shredded beef, scallions, and water, the dish generally also includes bean sprouts, gosari (bracken fern), torandae (taro stems), sliced onion, dangmyeon (sweet potato noodles), chili powder, garlic, perilla seeds (also called wild sesame seeds), soy sauce, oil (sesame oil and/or vegetable oil), black pepper, and salt. Chili oil may also be used. Yukgaejang is generally served with a bowl of rice and kimchi.

== History ==
The etymological origin of yukgaejang is gaejang (Korean: 개장), a dog meat ("개") stew which was boiled with spicy sauce and various herbs to hide away the strong odor of the fragrant meat. Yukgaejang was created as a beef-based substitute variant of gaejang for those who disfavored the consumption of dogs, with yuk (肉, meat) being a metonym for beef.

The first culinary records of yukgaejang appear in the Kyugonyoram (규곤요람; 閨壼要覽), a Hangul cookbook written in the early 1800s. During the Japanese colonial era, a Daegu variant of the dish known as Daegutang (대구탕; 大邱湯) gained popularity. As beef became more accessible, the dish was brought to Seoul with the construction of the Gyeongbu Line, and eventually became widespread throughout Korea.

== Variety ==
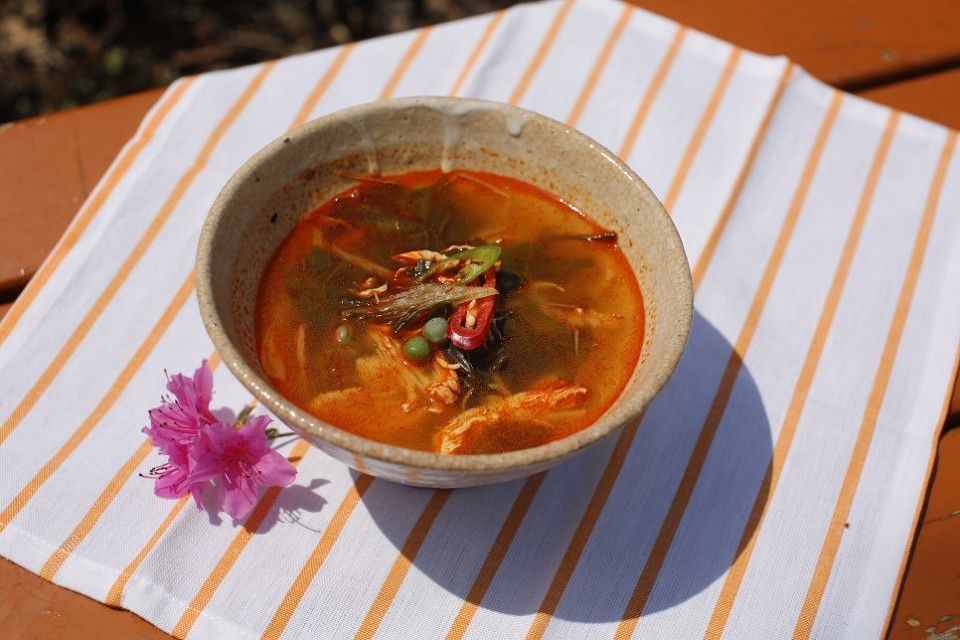
Dakgaejang (spicy chicken soup)

The dish may alternatively be made with chicken rather than beef, in which case it is called dak-yukgaejang or dakgaejang.

== See also ==
- Gomguk
- Goulash
- Fisherman's Soup
- List of beef dishes
