= Andongjang =

Historic restaurant in Seoul, South Korea

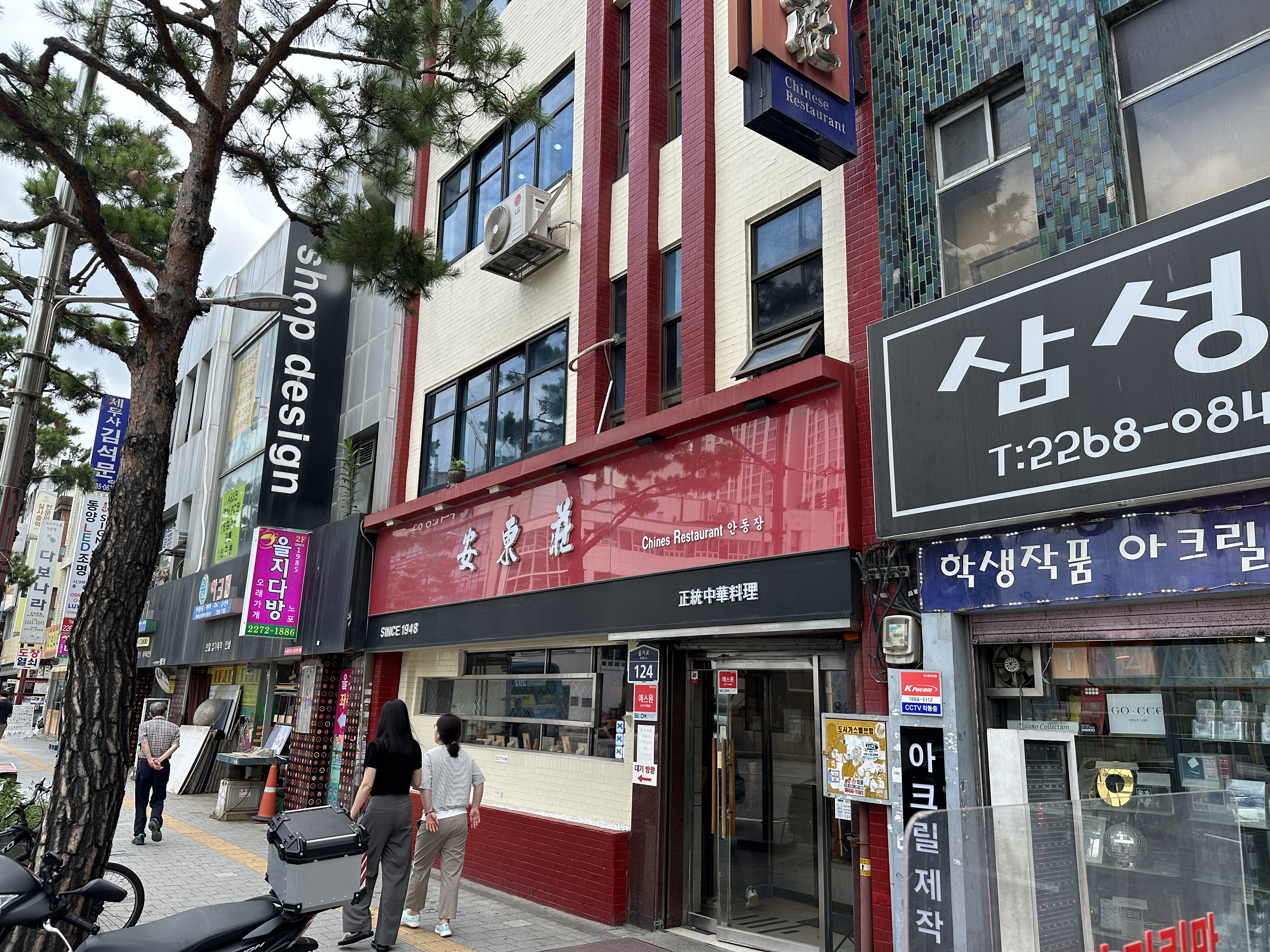
- Andongjang (2024)

General information
- Coordinates: 37.5661°N 126.9916°E
- Designations

Seoul Future Heritage
- Reference no.: 2013-175

Restaurant information
- Established: 1948; 77 years ago
- Food type: Korean Chinese cuisine
- Location: 124 Eulji-ro, Jung District, Seoul, South Korea

Andongjang (Korean: 안동장; Hanja: 安東莊) is a historic Korean-Chinese restaurant in Seoul, South Korea. It is the oldest continually operating Korean Chinese restaurant in the city, having been founded in 1948. It has remained a family business, and is currently on its third generation of owners. It is a designated Seoul Future Heritage.

The restaurant was founded by Chinese immigrants fleeing war in China. They first settled in Incheon. They named their restaurant after a place in Shandong, where their ancestors were from. It was initially near what is now CGV Piccadilly 1958, but moved as Jongno District saw redevelopment in the 1950s. It moved to its current location on the street Euljiro in 1956, and registered as a business in 1964. It was originally a three-story wooden building. After multiple renovations, it eventually became a five-story building with a basement.

Its signature dish is reportedly its oyster jjamppong.
