= Woo Lae Oak =

Restaurant chain based in Seoul, South Korea

Restaurant information
- Established: 1946; 79 years ago
- Food type: Korean cuisine, Pyongyang naengmyeon
- Location: 62-29 Changgyeonggung-ro, Jung District, Seoul, 04546, South Korea
- Coordinates: 37.5681°N 126.9987°E

Woo Lae Oak (Korean: 우래옥; Hanja: 又來屋; RR: uraeok; lit. 'place to come back to') is a historic Pyongyang naengmyeon restaurant in Jung District, Seoul, South Korea. It is the oldest active Pyongyang naengmyeon restaurant in Seoul. The restaurant is listed on the Michelin Guide as a Bib Gourmand restaurant.

The restaurant had a predecessor called Myeongwolgwan (명월관) in Pyongyang, North Korea. That restaurant's owner, Jang Won-il (장원일), moved to Seoul and opened Seobukgwan (서북관) in 1946 on the street Euljiro. During the Korean War, he fled for safety, and returned and changed the restaurant's name to Woo Lae Oak. By 2024, Jang's twin granddaughters were running the business.

The restaurant reportedly has a reputation of being pricy, especially for naengmyeon, but popular and among the finest naengmyeon offered in Seoul. It reportedly has a longtime loyal fanbase that consistently visits.

The restaurant had other branches in Daechi-dong and in Washington, D.C. in the United States, but both those branches were closed by 2024. It also had a Beverly Hills, California location that opened in 1993 but closed in 2012, as well as a SoHo, Manhattan branch that closed in 2011.

In 2017, a rebranded Woo Lae Oak entitled The Woo was opened in SoHo, Manhattan.
