= Imun Seolnongtang =

Oldest extant restaurant in South Korea

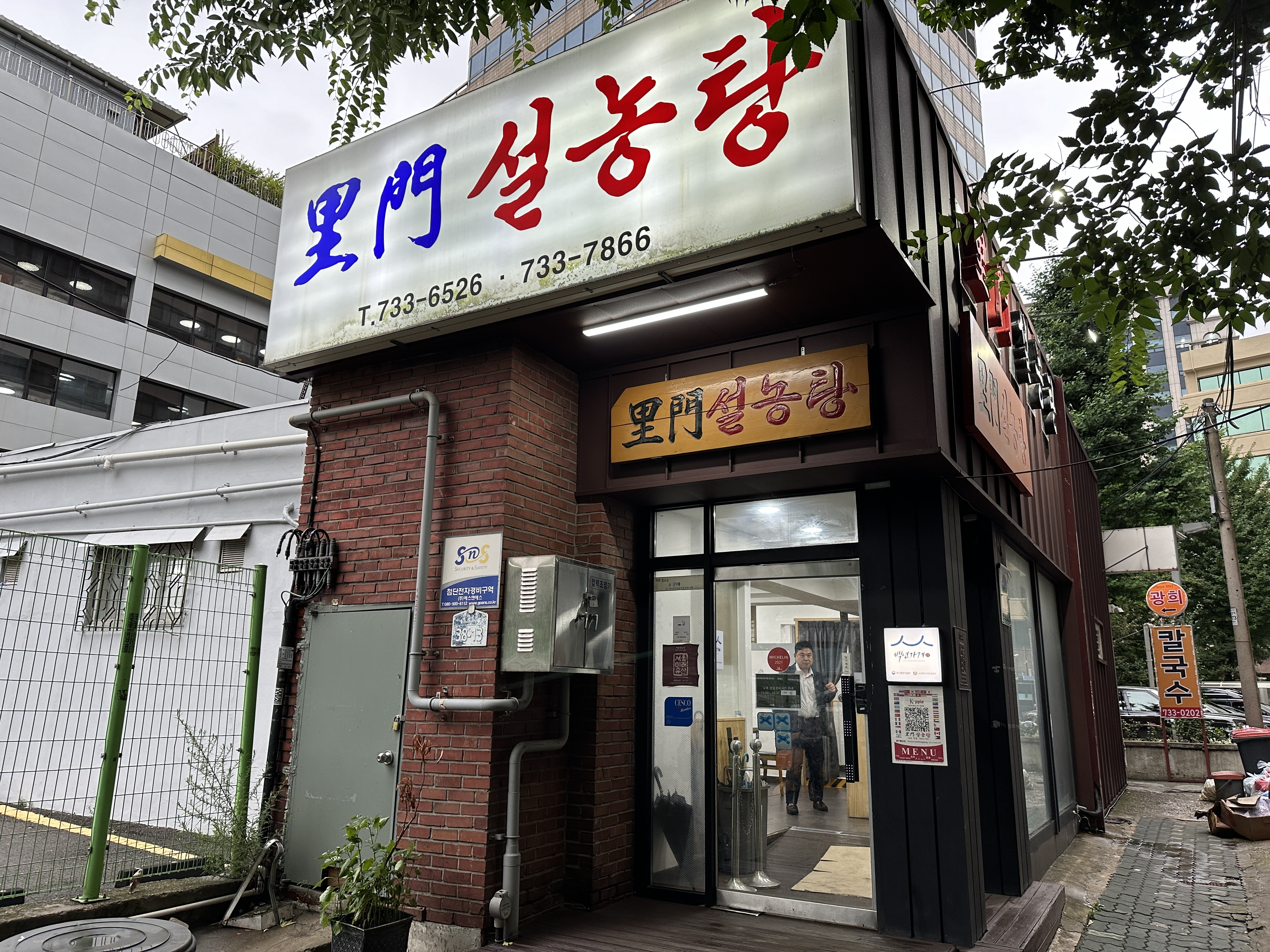
- Outside the restaurant (2024)

General information
- Location: 38-13, Ujeongguk-ro, Jongno District, Seoul, South Korea
- Coordinates: 37.5726°N 126.9839°E

Design and construction
- Designations

Seoul Future Heritage
- Reference no.: 2013-214

Restaurant information
- Established: c. 1904
- Food type: Korean cuisine, seolleongtang
- Website: imun.modoo.at

Imun Seolnongtang (Korean: 이문설농탕; Hanja: 里門雪濃湯) is a historic restaurant in Seoul, South Korea. It is the oldest operating restaurant in South Korea, having been founded in c. 1904, during the Korean Empire period. It specializes in the ox bone soup dish seolleongtang.

The restaurant is one of relatively few to have survived the tumultuous 1910–1945 Japanese colonial period and 1950–1953 Korean War. It has used the same cooking methods and recipes since its founding. It used the same building, dating to the colonial period, until 2011, when the area it was in was redeveloped.

It is now a popular tourist attraction, and is listed on the Michelin Guide. In 2013, it was made a Seoul Future Heritage.

== Name ==
The restaurant's original name is believed to have been Imun Sikdang (Note: Some sources claim the original name was "Imun-ok" (이문옥; 里門屋). However, one Munhwa Ilbo reporter argues those sources are mistaking another similarly-named restaurant for Imun Sikdang.) (이문식당; 里門食堂). "Imun" refers to Imun-gol (이문골; 里門골), an archaic name for a nearby hill. "Seolnongtang" is a spelling variation of seolleongtang that is considered archaic.

== Description ==
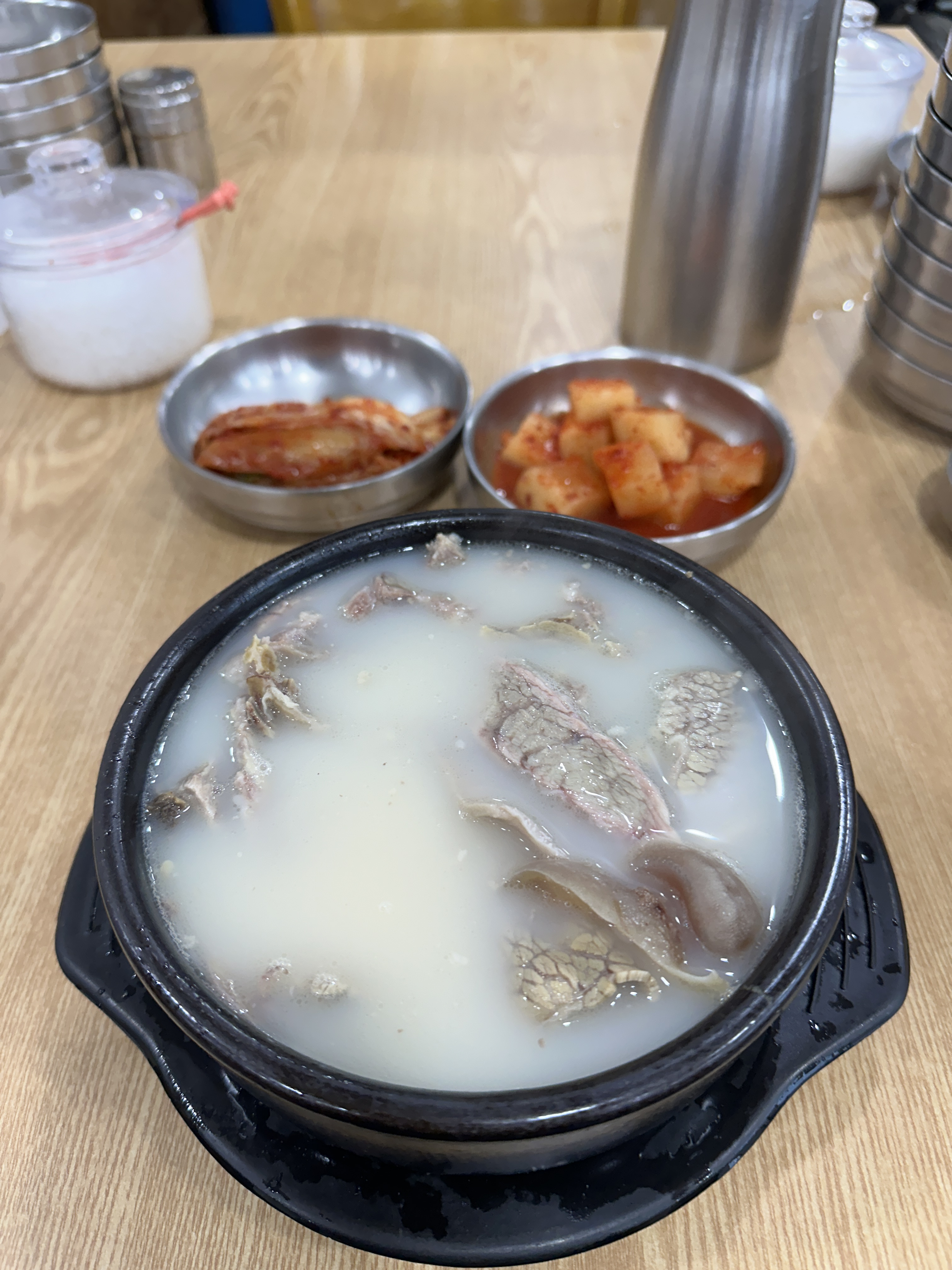
Seolleongtang served in the restaurant. Salt and green onions are provided for adjusting the dish to one's taste. (2024)

The restaurant specializes in seolleongtang. It is transparent about its simple cooking techniques and ingredients. It boils its broth for 16 to 17 hours before serving. According to a 2004 interview, the owner of the restaurant chose to not expand the restaurant further, in order to focus on maintaining the quality, consistency, and low cost of the food.

It is now a popular tourist attraction. It has been featured on television shows like Wednesday Food Talk.

== History ==
It is not known with certainty when the restaurant was founded; years ranging from 1902 to 1907 have been given by various people who remembered the restaurant's early history. After an investigation, in 2011, the Seoul Metropolitan Government gave the founding year as 1904, and affirmed that it was the oldest restaurant. Its founder is also not known with certainty; a man with the surname Hong (full name unknown) is believed to have been the founder. During the colonial period, a man named Hong Jong-hwan (홍종환; 洪鍾煥) has been attested to being an owner of the restaurant. At some point, the restaurant was taken over by someone with the surname Yang. In 1960, a woman named Yu Won-seok (유원석) acquired the restaurant from Yang. In 1981, her son Jeon Seong-geun (전성근; 田聖根) became the owner.

During the colonial period, the restaurant was seen as a premiere location for seolleongtang, and the dish was seen as the representative food of Seoul (then Keijō). The restaurant featured in a number of news articles, and employed numerous delivery people. As it opened early in the morning, it became a favorite location for people who worked night shifts.

It counted among its regular customers a number of famous people in Korean history, including the first ethnic Korean Olympic gold medalist Sohn Kee-chung, first Vice President of South Korea Yi Si-yeong, Korean labor activist Pak Hon-yong, and politician and "political gangster" Kim Du-han. In his teens, Kim Du-han worked as an employee at the restaurant. A number of South Korean athletes frequented the restaurant, including boxers Moon Sung-kil and Kim Kwang-sun and judoka Ha Hyung-joo. Some athletes who visited it were so devoted to the restaurant that they jokingly founded a "Imun Society" (이문회).

Around 1:45 pm on October 16, 2023, it experienced a fire that was caused by grease in the kitchen exhaust vents igniting. The restaurant was temporarily closed for repairs.

== See also ==
- Jaembaeok – another historic seolleongtang restaurant in Seoul
- Naju Gomtang Hayanjib – restaurant in Naju, founded in 1910
- Yonggeumok – third oldest restaurant in Seoul
