= Oxtail =

Tail of an ox

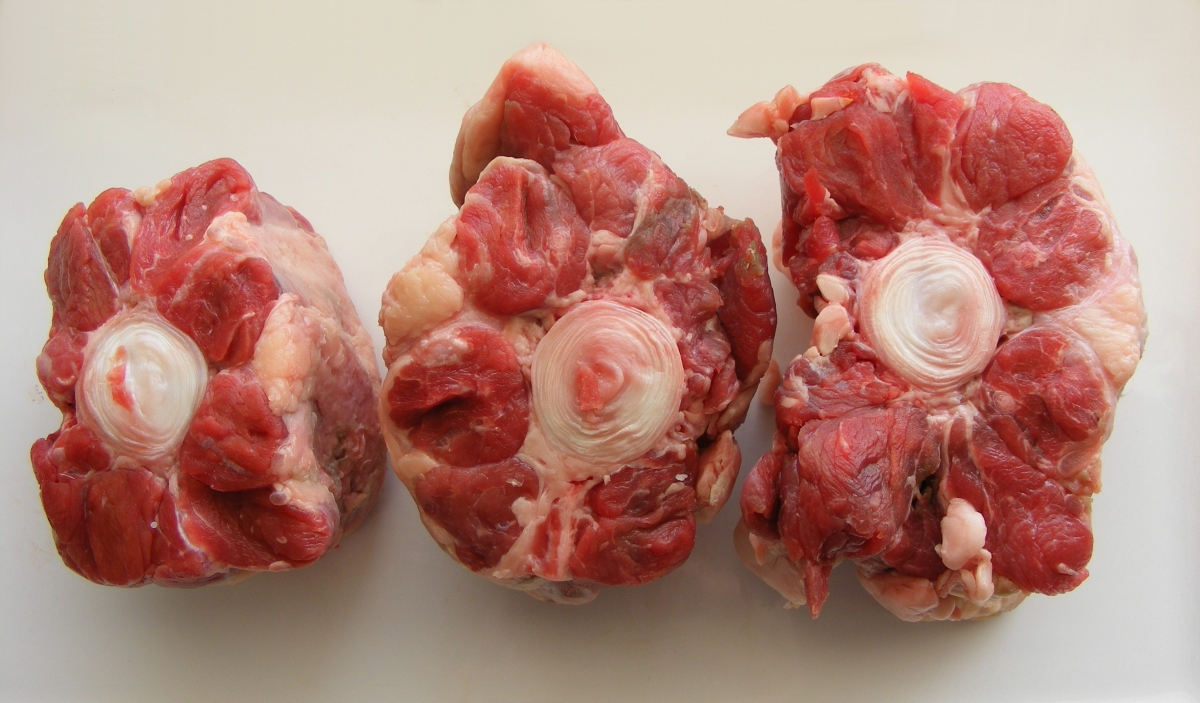
Raw oxtail

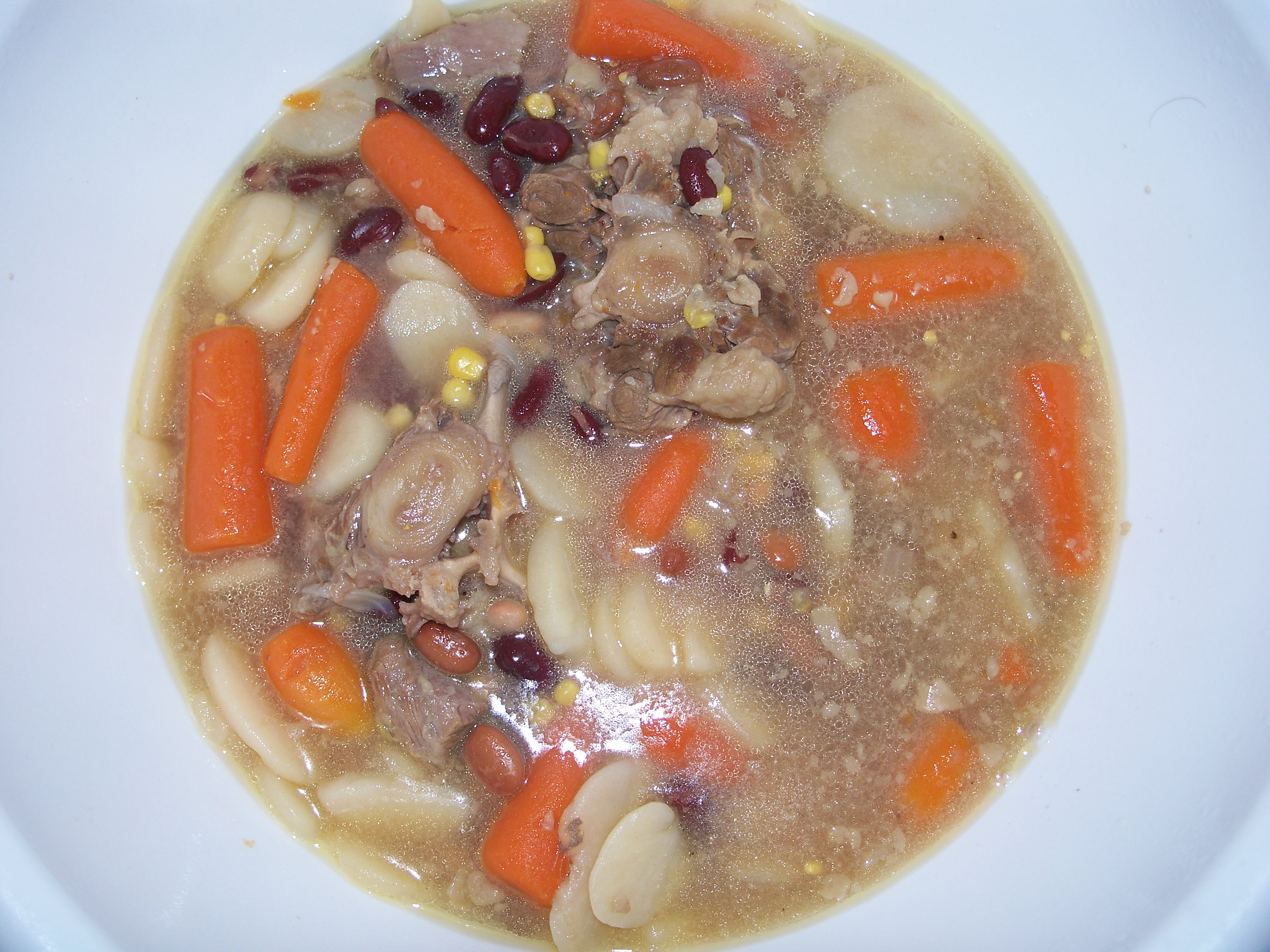
Southern oxtail soup

Oxtail (occasionally spelled ox tail or ox-tail) is the culinary name for the tail of cattle. While the word once meant only the tail of an ox, today it can also refer to the tails of other cattle. An oxtail typically weighs around 3.5 kilograms (8 pounds) and is skinned and cut into shorter lengths for sale.

Oxtail is a gelatin-rich meat, which is usually slow-cooked as a stew or braised. It is a traditional stock base for oxtail soup. Traditional preparations involve slow cooking, so some modern recipes take a shortcut using a pressure cooker.

== Versions ==
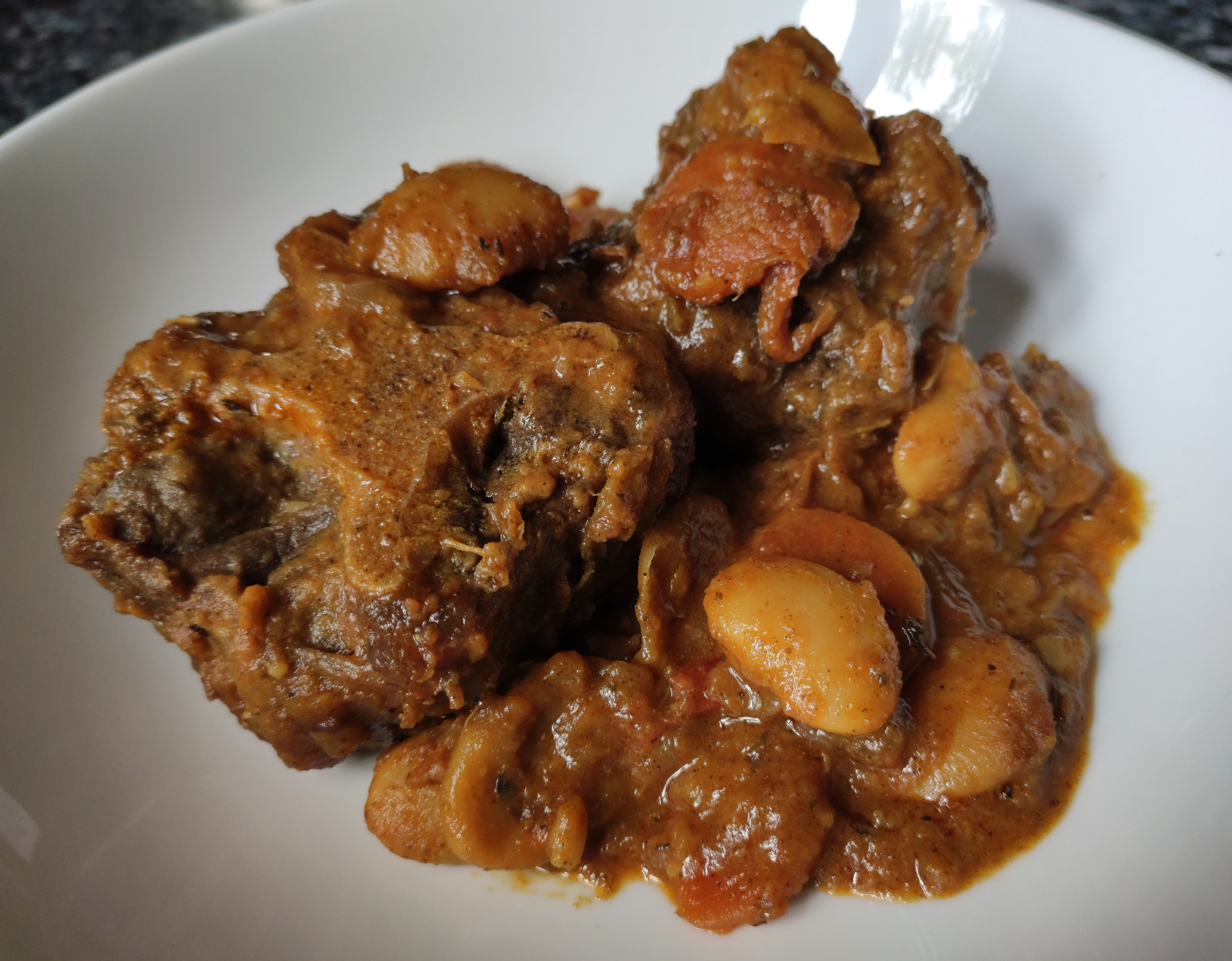
Jamaican oxtail with butter beans

Oxtail is the main ingredient of the Italian dish coda alla vaccinara (a classic of Roman cuisine). It is a popular flavour for powdered, instant, and premade canned soups in the United Kingdom and Ireland. Oxtails are also one of the popular bases for terrine-like kholodets, the Eastern European aspic dish, also prepared from cows' knees, pig trotters or ears. There are numerous oxtail stews in French cuisine.

Stewed oxtail cooked with lima beans or lablab—both known as butter beans—or broad beans and traditionally served with plain white rice and, lately, with rice and peas is commonly eaten as a main dish in Jamaica as well as throughout the Caribbean. Oxtail is also very popular in South Africa, where it is often cooked in a traditional skillet called a potjie, which is a three-legged cast iron pot placed over an open fire. Oxtail is also eaten in other southern parts of Africa, like Zimbabwe, and served with sadza and greens. In Cuban cuisine, a stew can be made from oxtail called rabo encendido. In the Philippines, it is prepared in a peanut-based stew called kare-kare. In Iran, oxtail is slow-cooked and served as a substitute for shank in a main dish called baghla-poli-mahicheh, which is prepared with rice, shank (or oxtail), and a mixture of herbs including dill, coriander, parsley, and garlic. In India, it is known as dumghazah in the parts in and around Lucknow, Uttar Pradesh, and is considered a delicacy.

Versions of oxtail soup are popular traditional dishes in South America, West Africa, China, Spain, Korea and Indonesia. In Chinese cuisine, it is usually made into a soup called in Chinese: 牛尾汤; pinyin: niúwěi tāng; lit. 'oxtail soup'. In Korean cuisine, a type of gomguk (beef bone soup) made with oxtail is called kkori-gomtang (꼬리곰탕). It is a thick soup seasoned with salt and eaten with a bowl of rice. It can be used as a stock for making tteokguk (rice cake soup).

In the United States, oxtail has the meat-cutting classification NAMP 1791.
