= Gomguk =

Korean beef soup

Gomtang
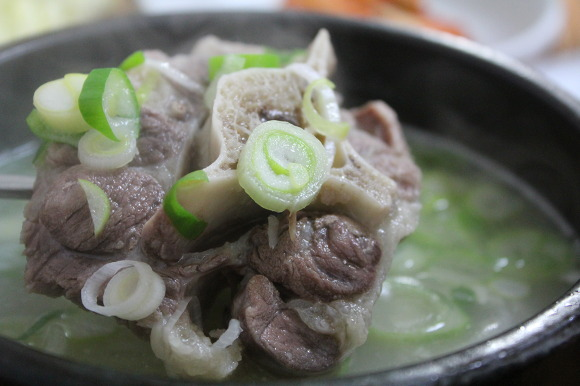
- Kkori-gomtang (oxtail soup), a type of gomguk
- Alternative names: Beef bone soup
- Type: Guk
- Place of origin: Korea
- Main ingredients: Beef bones, oxtail, head, trotters, knee cartilage, tripe, intestines, and/or brisket

Korean name
- Hangul: 곰국
- RR: gomguk
- MR: komkuk
- IPA: [kom.k͈uk̚]

Gomtang
- Hangul: 곰탕
- Hanja: 곰湯
- RR: gomtang
- MR: komt'ang
- IPA: [kom.tʰaŋ]

Gomguk (Korean: 곰국), gomtang (곰탕), or beef bone soup refers to a soup in traditional Korean cuisine made with various beef parts such as ribs, oxtail, brisket, ox's head or ox bones by slow simmering on a low flame. The broth tends to have a milky color with a rich and hearty taste.

== Varieties ==
=== Regional ===
- Hyeonpung gomtang: from the region of Hyeonpung. Broth is made from ox tail, brisket, cow's feet and innards.
- Naju gomtang: from the region of Naju. Cooked heel meat and brisket are added to the broth.

=== By ingredients ===
- Sagol gomtang (사골곰탕): beef leg bones are the main ingredients
- Kkori-gomtang (꼬리곰탕): ox tail soup
- Toran gomtang (토란곰탕): beef brisket based with toran
- Seolleongtang (설렁탕): ox leg bone soup simmered for more than 10 hours until the soup is milky-white. Usually served in a bowl containing somyeon (thin wheat flour noodles) and pieces of beef. Sliced scallions and black pepper are used as condiments. Sometimes served with rice instead of noodles.
- Galbi-tang (갈비탕): made with galbi (beef short ribs)
- Yukgaejang (육개장): gomtang with additional spicy seasoning
- Doganitang (도가니탕): beef knee cartilage is an additional ingredient
- Chupotang (추포탕): finely ground perilla is added

=== Not beef-based ===
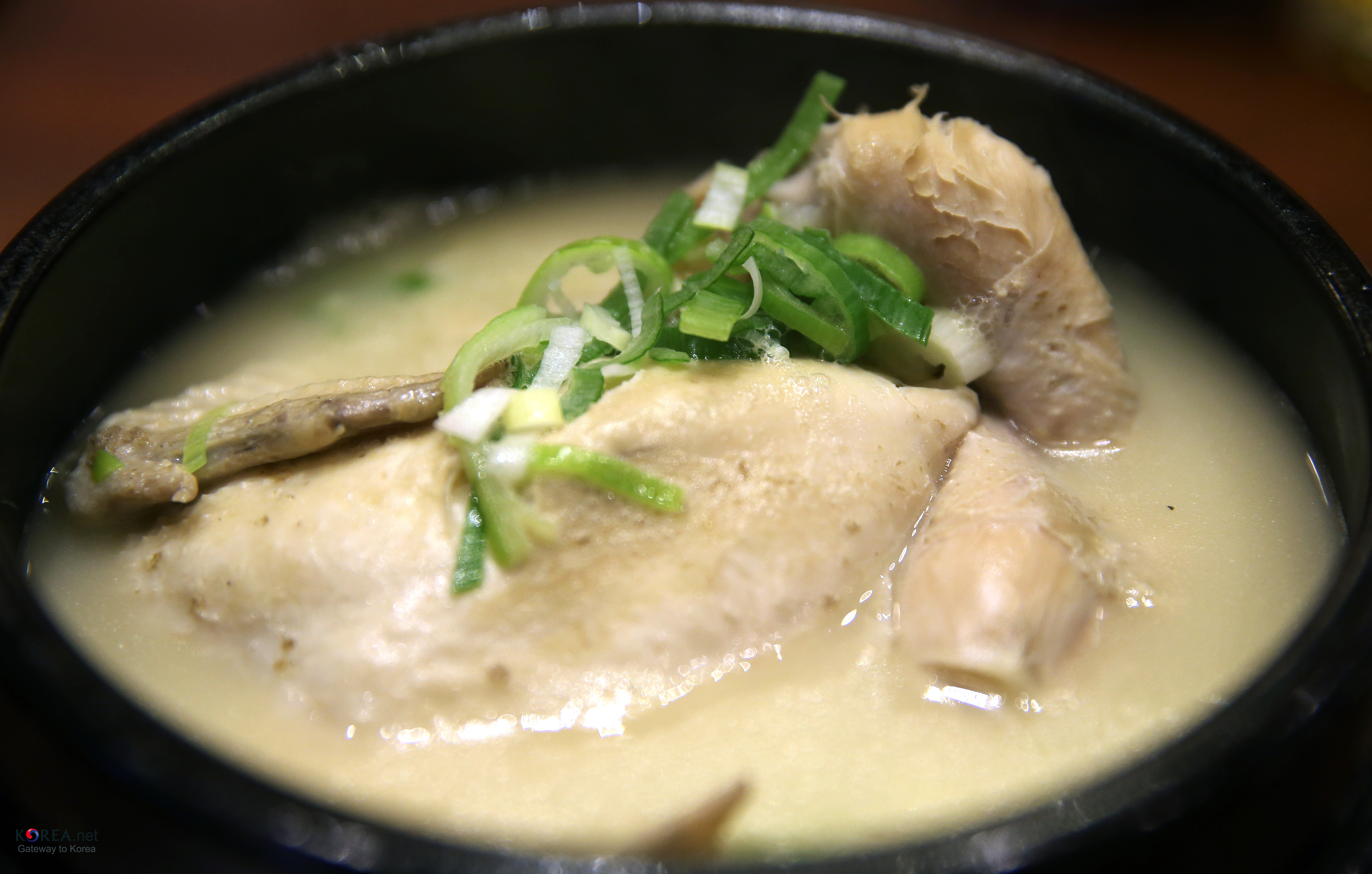
Samgyetang

- Gamulchi gomtang: made from snakehead fish with glutinous rice, ginger, ginseng and jujubes
- Samgyetang (삼계탕): based with chicken stuffed with ginseng, glutinous rice, jujubes, garlic, and chestnuts
- Gamjatang (감자탕): a spicy soup made with separated pork spine, potatoes and hot peppers.
- Jumunjin mulgomtang (주문진 물곰탕): from the region of Jumunjin. Made from moray eel, kimchi and spring onions

== See also ==
- Jjigae
- Jeongol
- List of soups
