= Oxtail soup =

Soup made with beef tails

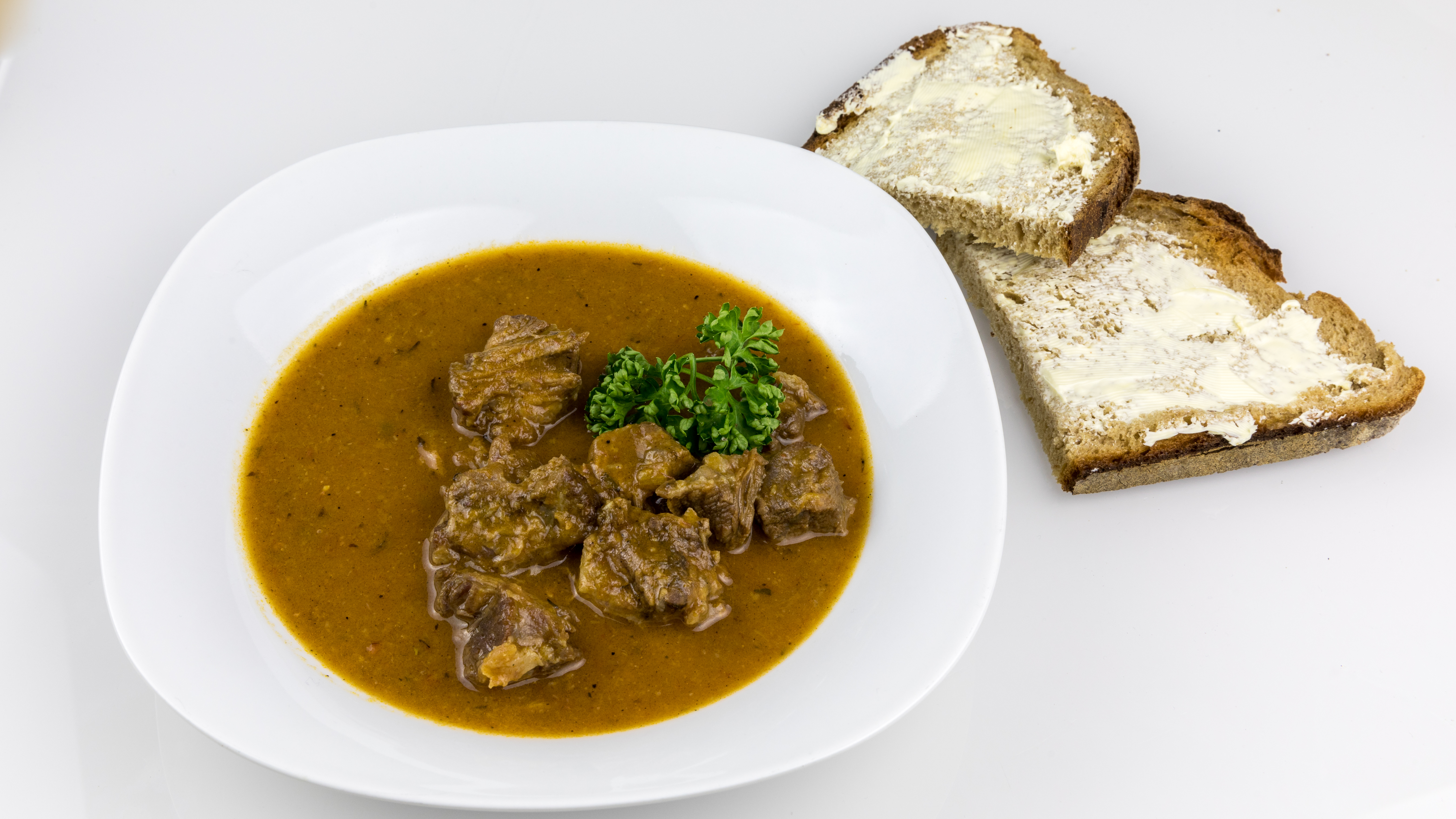
- Oxtail soup with sliced bread
- Type: Soup
- Place of origin: Various
- Main ingredients: Oxtail

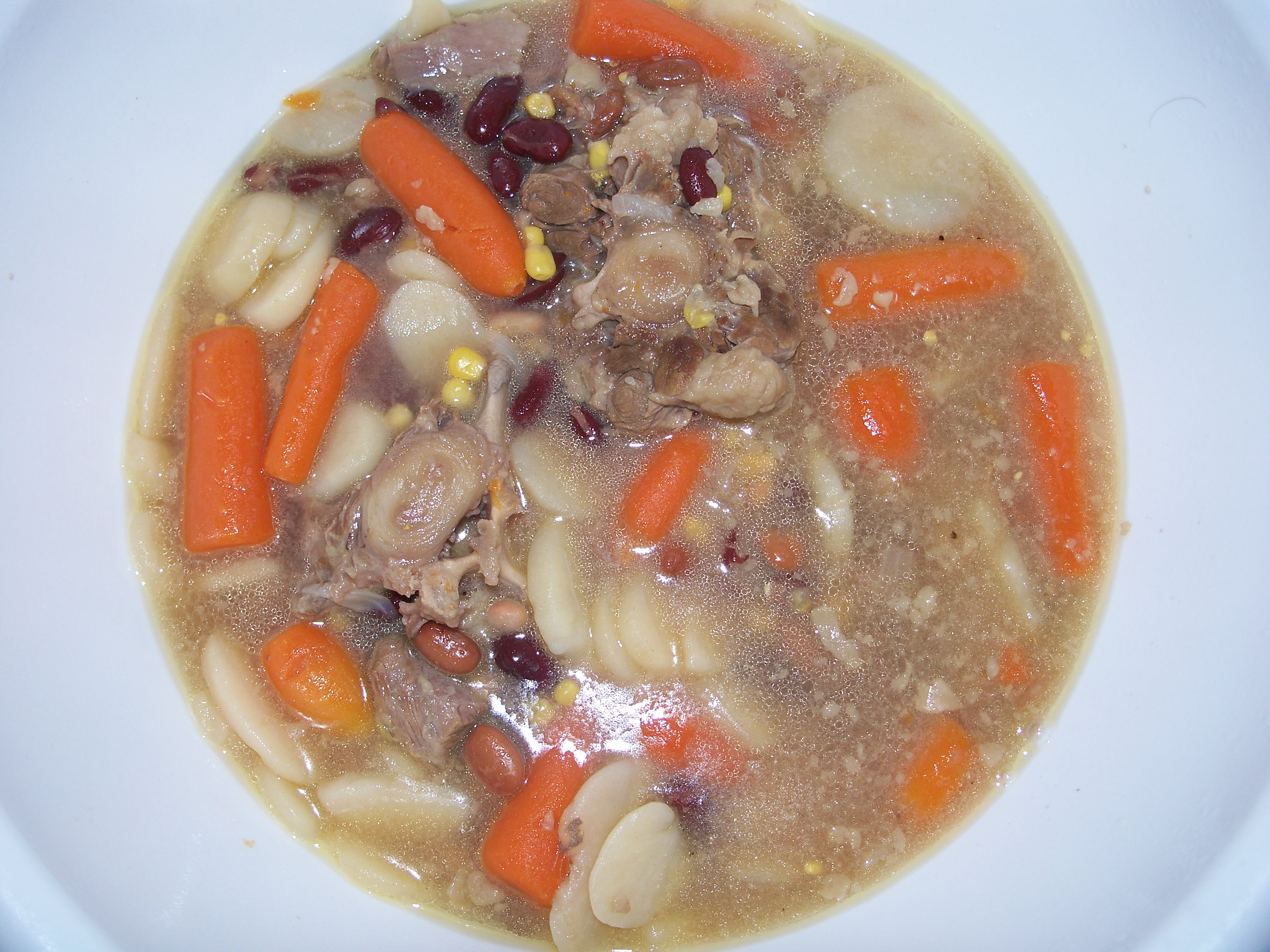
Southern oxtail soup

Oxtail soup is made with oxtail, a cheap cut of beef. In English usage the term "ox" reflects the social divide in England after the Norman Conquest: beef (boeuf) referred to the superior cuts served to the Anglo-Norman ruling class; the less favoured parts of the animal were referred to with the Saxon prefix "ox". The soup has been adopted in French cuisine, and there are examples from several other parts of the world. Being made with tough meat, oxtail soup requires slow, gentle and long cooking.

== England ==
In English usage the "ox" arises from the social divide that existed in England after the Norman Conquest: beef (boeuf) referred to the choice cuts reserved for the Anglo-Norman ruling class; the less esteemed parts of the animal, with which the conquered Anglo-Saxons had to be content, were referred to with the Saxon prefix "ox", such as ox-cheek and ox-tongue.

In 1845 Eliza Acton printed a recipe, calling it "An inexpensive and very nutritious soup". As well as the oxtail her recipe includes ham, a knuckle of bacon, onions, celery, turnips and herbs, and she suggests using beef stock rather than water as the cooking liquid. Mrs Beeton (1861) offers a similar recipe, with the addition of a little port wine. Both Acton and Beeton thicken their soup with flour or arrowroot. The soup is simmered long and gently.

== France ==
Alexis Soyer (1853) published a recipe for oxtail soup in his The Modern Housewife, or, Ménagère. The ingredients and technique are similar to those of English cooks, and like his successors he gives variants for thickened or clear oxtail soups. In his Grand dictionnaire de cuisine (1873), Alexandre Dumas gives recipes for oxtail stews but not soups. Auguste Escoffier (1903) prints two recipes for potage ox-tail. It is given its English title rather than the French queue de boeuf and noted as cuisine anglais. In Escoffier's book, and also in Louis Saulnier's La Repertoire de la cuisine, recipes are given for clear oxtail soup (clair) and for ox-tail lié (thickened). A slow and gentle simmer is required.

== Germany ==
German versions of oxtail soup (Ochsenschwanzesuppe) typically use similar ingredients to those in British and French versions: to the oxtail are added vegetables such as onions, carrots, celery, turnip or parsnip, with the possible addition of diced boiled ham. As with other oxtail soups, the cooking is a gentle, long simmer. The soup may be served with noodles (Nudeln).

== Hawaii ==
In the Hawaii version, the soup is reminiscent of Vietnamese pho broth. The broth may contain star anise, ginger, onions, chen pi (dried citrus peel), peppercorns and bay leaves. The soup is garnished with shallots and coriander, with fresh grated ginger and soy sauce for dipping or as a condiment.

== Indonesia ==
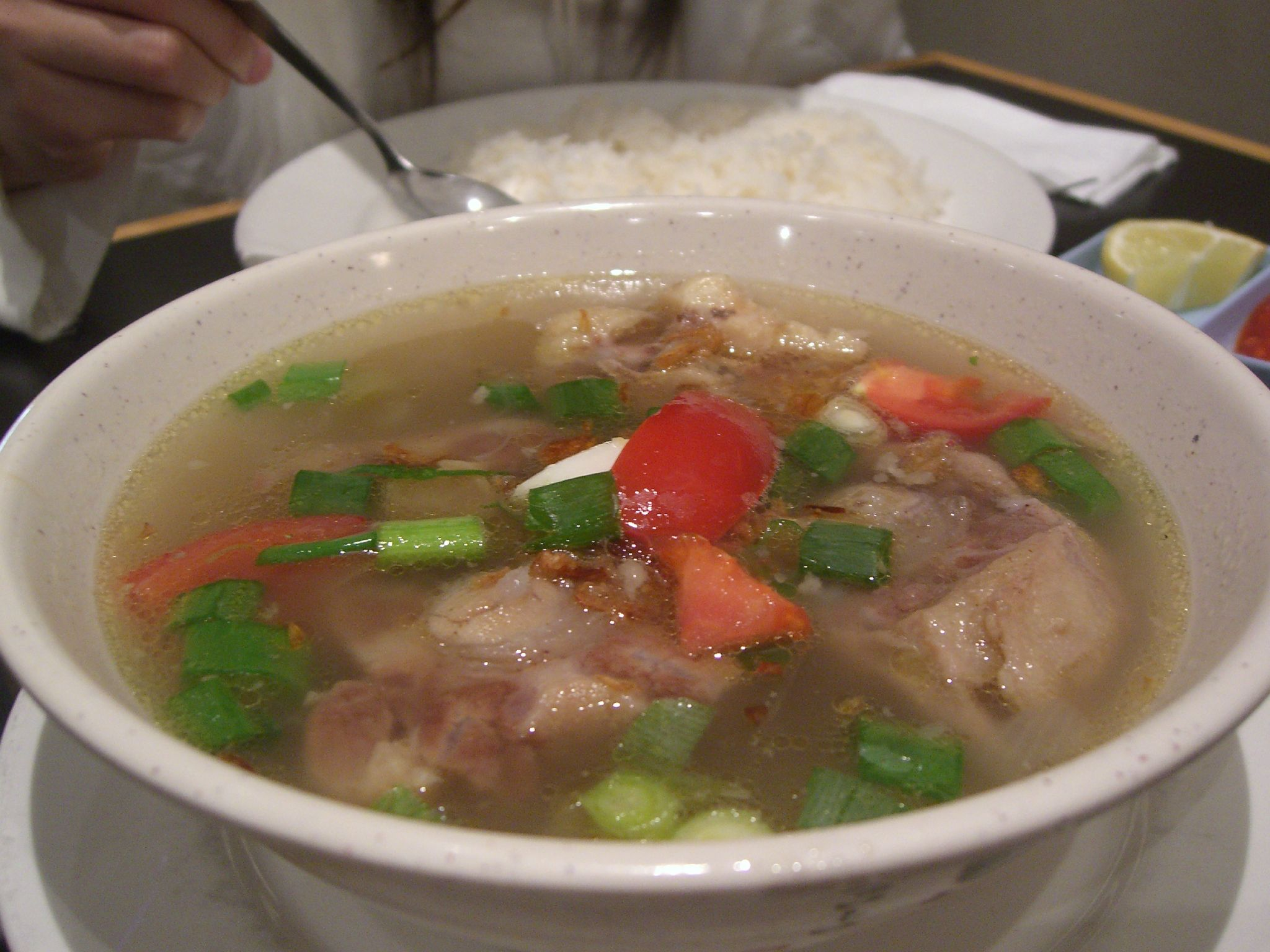
Indonesian sop buntut

In Indonesian cuisine, oxtail soup (Indonesian: sop buntut) is made of slices of fried or barbecued oxtail, served with vegetables in a rich but clear beef broth. It contains boiled potatoes, carrots, tomatoes, leek, celery, fried shallots and dried black mushrooms. It is seasoned with shallot, garlic and spices. A variant is called sop buntut goreng (fried oxtail soup), where the oxtail is seasoned, fried and served dry; the soup is served in a separate bowl. The dish is commonly eaten with rice and accompanied by sambal, sweet soy sauce and lime juice. Some restaurants specialize in oxtail soup, among them being the Bogor Café in the Hotel Borobudur in Central Jakarta.

The dish is also eaten in Malaysia, where it is known as sup ekor.

== Jamaica ==
A Jamaican oxtail soup recipe includes lima beans and chopped yam in the ingredients as well as a scotch bonnet pepper.

== Spain ==
Elisabeth Luard prints a recipe for Andalusian oxtail soup that includes paprika, chopped serrano ham, chopped tomatoes, cinnamon, garlic and other spices in addition to the oxtail.

== Korea ==
In Korean cuisine the dish is known as Kkori-gomtang (꼬리곰탕).

== See also ==
- Bulalo
- Kangaroo tail soup
- Oxtail stew
- List of Chinese soups
- List of Indonesian soups
- List of soups

== Sources ==
- Acton, Eliza (1845). Modern Cookery. London: Longman, Brown, Green. OCLC 776237549.
- Beeton, Isabella (1861). The Book of Household Management. London: S.O. Beeton. OCLC 1045333327.
- Ceserani, Victor; Ronald Kinton (1972). Practical Cookery. London: Edward Arnold. ISBN 978-0-71-311713-4.
- Davidson, Alan (1999). The Oxford Companion to Food. Oxford: Oxford University Press. ISBN 978-0-19-211579-9.
- Dumas, Alexandre (1873). Le Grand dictionnaire de cuisine. Paris: Alphonse Lemerre. OCLC 924392186.
- Escoffier, Auguste; Gilbert, Philéas (1903). Le Guide culinaire, aide-mémoire de cuisine pratique. Paris: Emile Colin.
- Glasse, Hannah (1747). The Art of Cookery Made Plain and Easy. London: Glasse. OCLC 561397353.
- Krüger, Arne (1972). German Cooking: Savoury German Dishes Prepared in the Traditional Way. New York: Round the World Books. OCLC 1033639815.
- Luard, Elisabeth (2009). Soup Galore. London: Spruce. ISBN 9781846013294.
- Quinn, Lucinda Scala (2006). Lucinda's Authentic Jamaican Kitchen. Hoboken: Wiley. ISBN 0471749354.
- Saulnier, Louis (1978) [1923]. Le Répertoire de la cuisine (fourteenth ed.). London: Jaeggi. OCLC 1086737491.
- Soyer, Alexis (1849). The Modern Housewife or Ménagère. London: Simpkin and Marshall. OCLC 13360438.
