= Galbi-tang =

Korean beef short rib soup

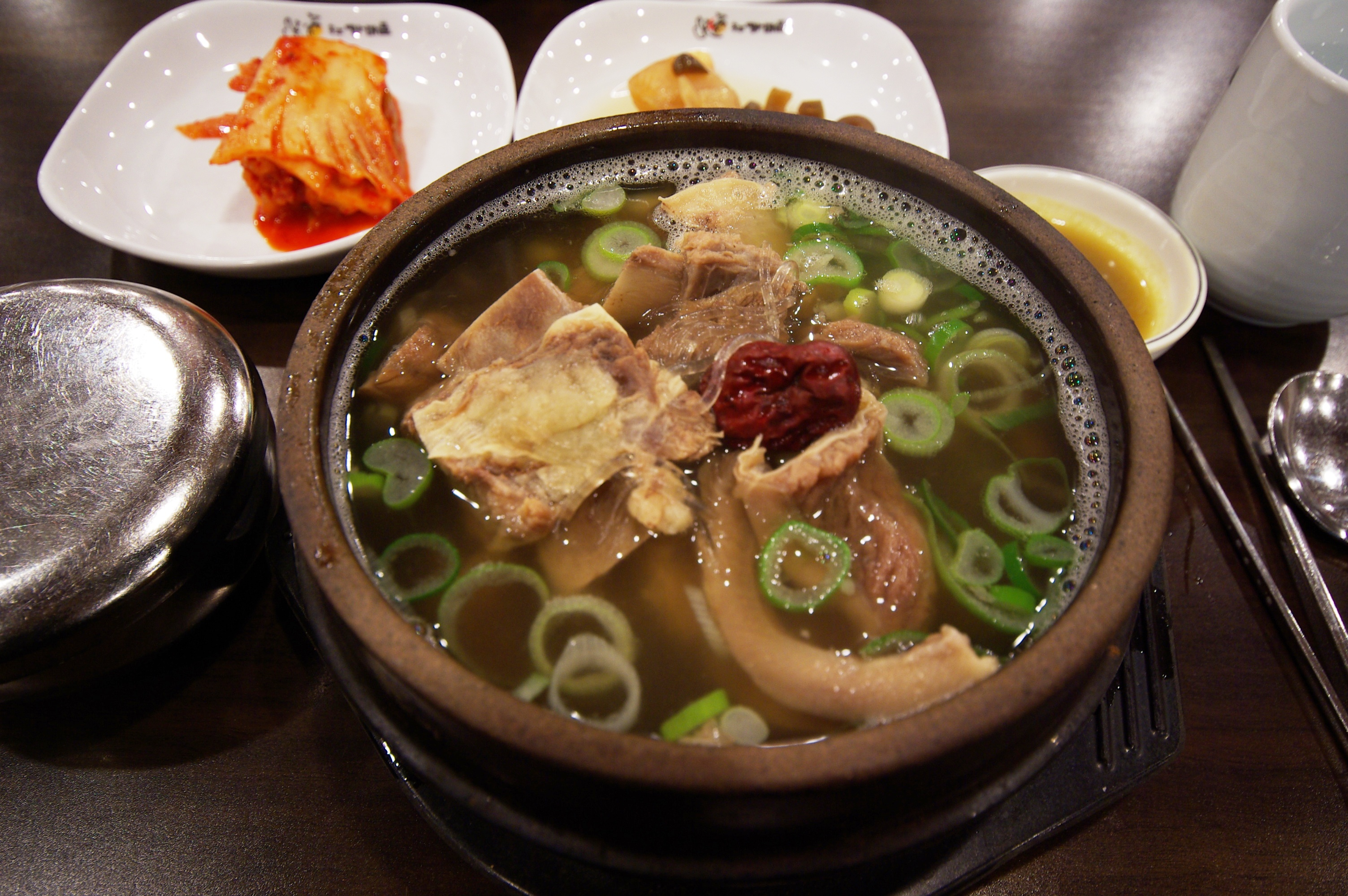
- Alternative names: Short rib soup
- Type: Tang
- Place of origin: Korea
- Main ingredients: Short ribs

Korean name
- Hangul: 갈비탕
- Hanja: 갈비湯
- RR: galbitang
- MR: kalbit'ang
- IPA: kal.bi.tʰaŋ

Galbi-tang (Korean: 갈비탕) or short rib soup is a variety of guk, or Korean soup, made primarily from beef short ribs along with stewing beef, radish, onions, and other ingredients. The short ribs, or "galbi", also refers to grilled short ribs in Korean barbecue while the suffix tang originally comes from Mandarin as another name for guk. Hence, the Korean name literally means "short ribs soup" and is also called garitang, or galitang. The clear and hearty soup is made by slowly simmering galbi in water for a long time and is eaten as a meal. It is similar to seolleongtang, a soup made from the bones of ox legs.

Historical records on galbitang are found in records on table setting for Korean royal court banquets held in the 1890s. However, galbi was assumed to have been eaten since the end of the Goryeo period (918 – 1392).

Originally served at royal court banquets, galbi-tang has evolved into a popular dish frequently offered at modern weddings and celebratory events, as well as a well-known nourishing soup enjoyed during the cold winter months.

== Preparation ==
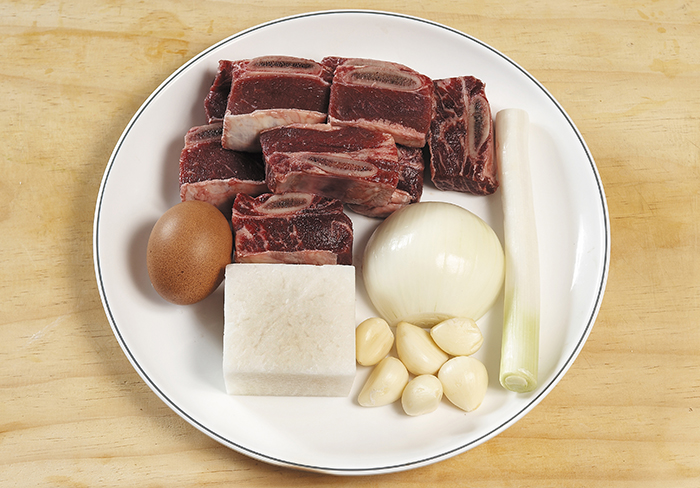
Typical galbi-tang ingredients

About five hours are needed to cook the whole dish. Slits are made in the top of the inner bones with a sharp knife before the ribs are cut to make the flesh separate easily from the prepared beef rib. The ribs are chopped into pieces of 5–6 cm in length, and a whole radish is inserted into a pot with water over a high heat at first. As time goes by, the heat is lowered to a medium temperature. Once the beef becomes soft after being simmered for about four to five hours, the radish is taken out of the pot. It is flatly sliced into a 3 cm length. The ribs are also taken out of the pot and seasoned with minced scallions, garlic, and pepper powder, sesame oil, a mixture of sesame and salt, and soy sauce. As the soup is chilled, fat floating on the surface is removed. The seasoned ribs and sliced radish are again put into the pot and are simmered one more time.

== Gallery ==
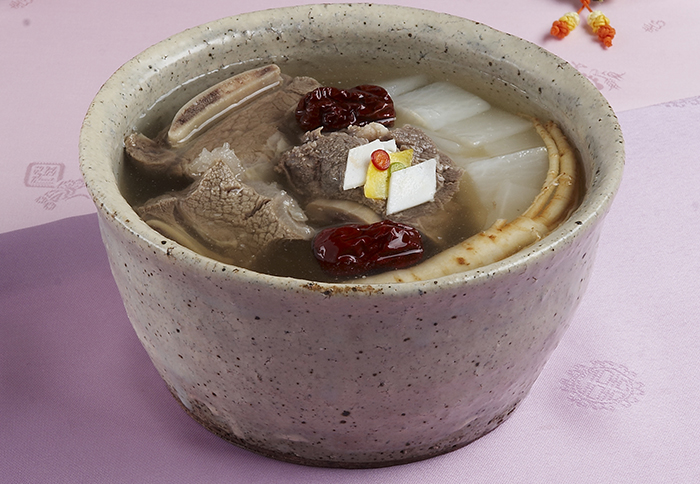

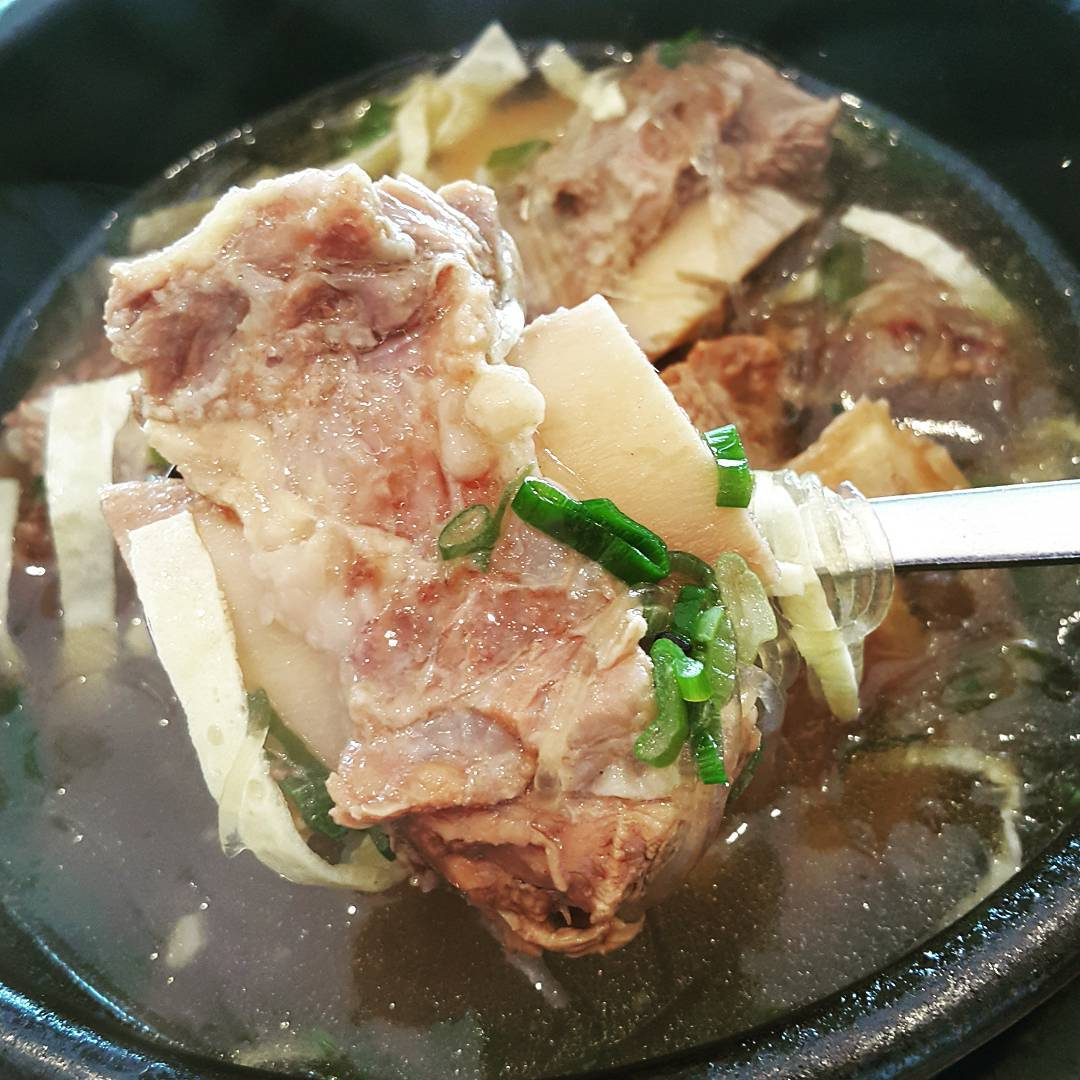

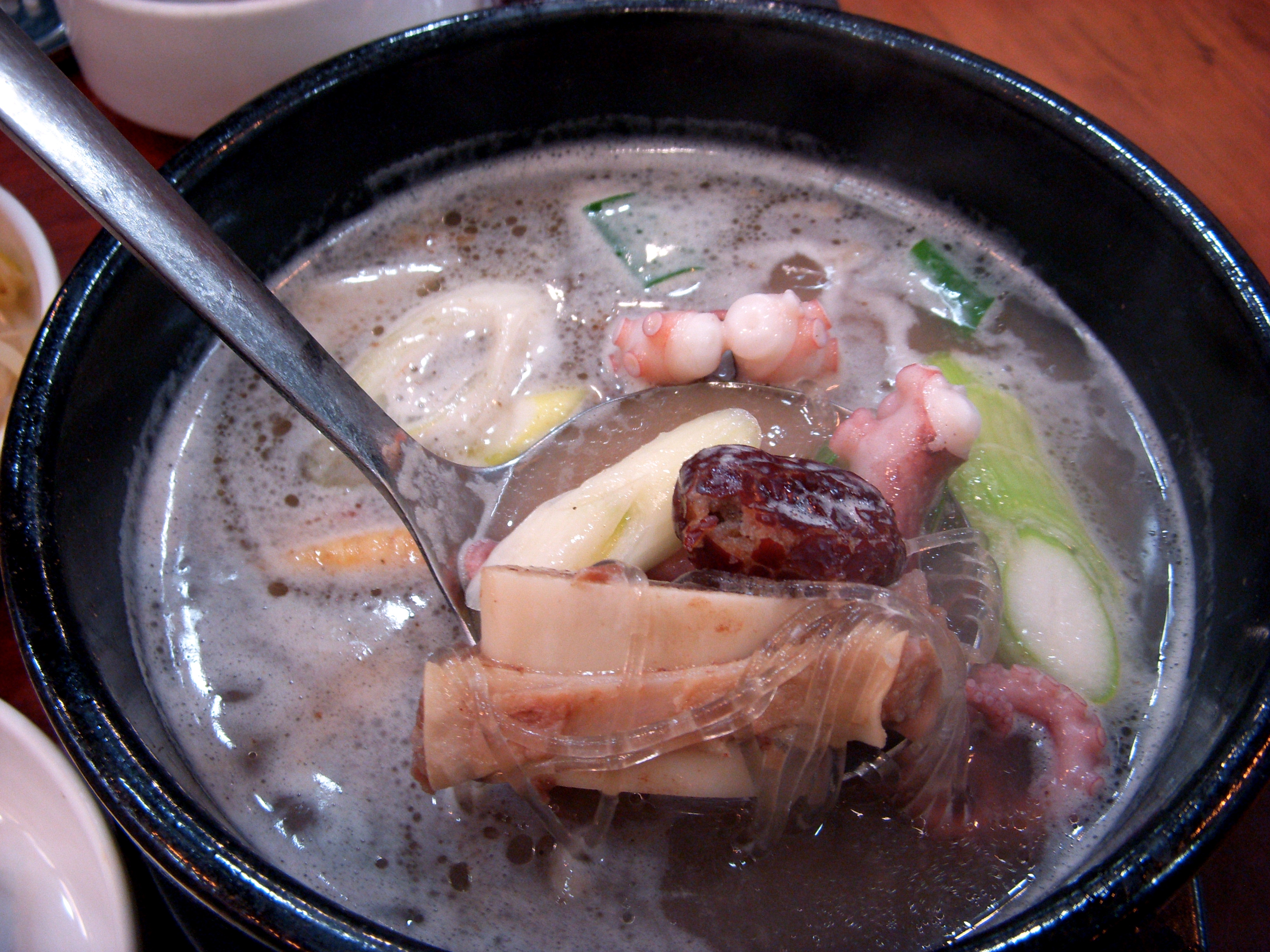

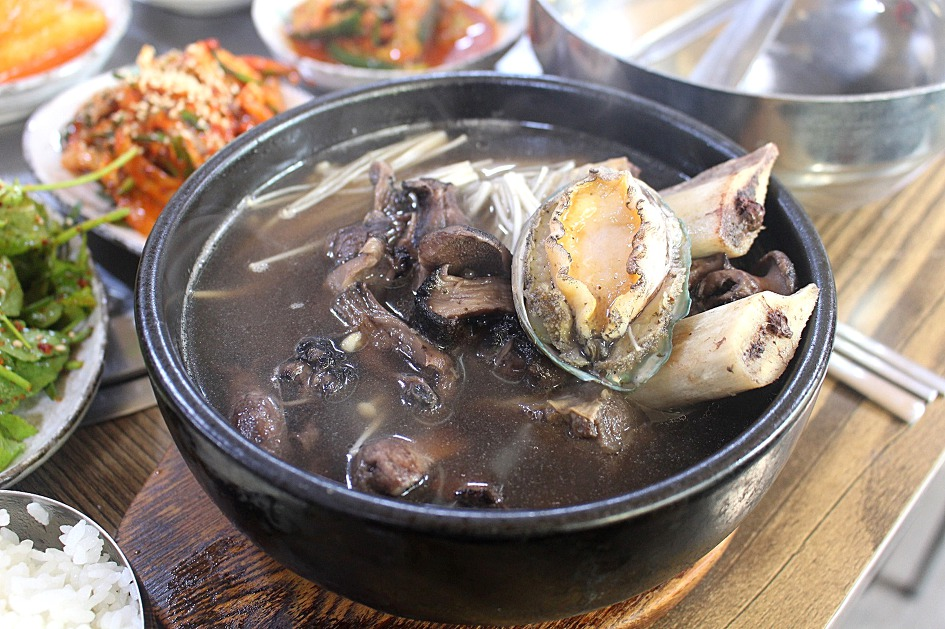
With abalone

== See also ==
- Samgyetang, a chicken ginseng soup
- Seolleongtang, a beef soup
- Haejangguk, soups eaten as a hangover remedy
- List of soups
- Korean cuisine
- List of Korean dishes
- Irish stew
