= Seolleongtang =

Korean soup made with ox bones

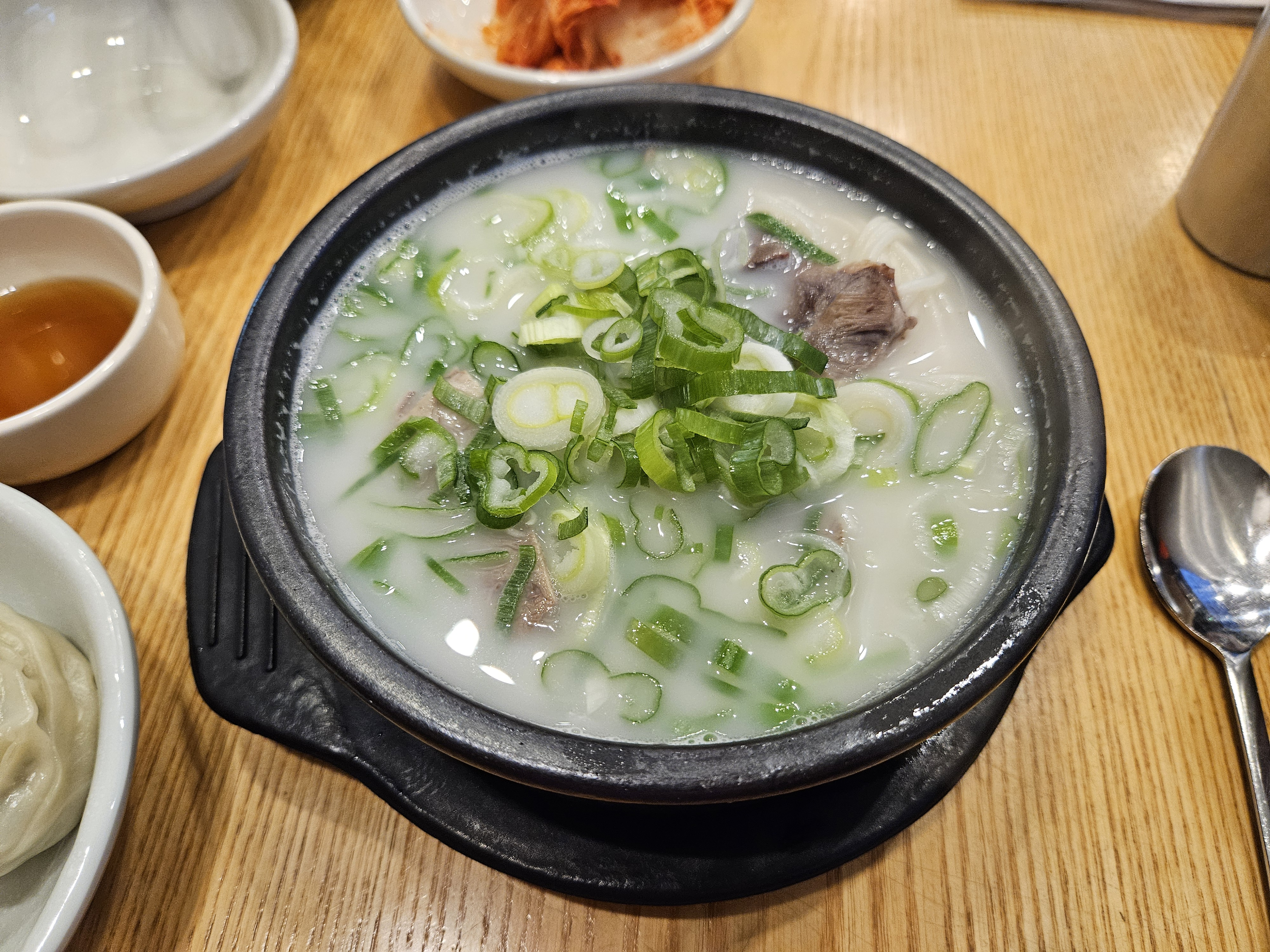
- Alternative names: Ox bone soup
- Type: Tang
- Place of origin: Korea
- Serving temperature: Hot
- Main ingredients: Beef bones, head, trotters, knee cartilage, and intestines

Korean name
- Hangul: 설렁탕
- Hanja: 설렁湯
- RR: seolleongtang
- MR: sŏllŏngt'ang
- IPA: [sʰʌl.lʌŋ.tʰaŋ]

Seolleongtang (Korean: 설렁탕) or ox bone soup is a Korean tang (soup) made from ox bones (mostly leg bones), brisket and other cuts. Seasoning is generally done at the table according to personal taste by adding salt, ground black pepper, red pepper, minced garlic, or chopped spring onions. It is a local dish of Seoul.

Seolleongtang is typically simmered over a low flame over a period of several hours to an entire day, to allow the flavor to be gradually extracted from the bones. It has a milky off-white, cloudy appearance and is normally eaten together with rice and several side dishes; the rice is sometimes added directly to the soup.

== History and etymology ==
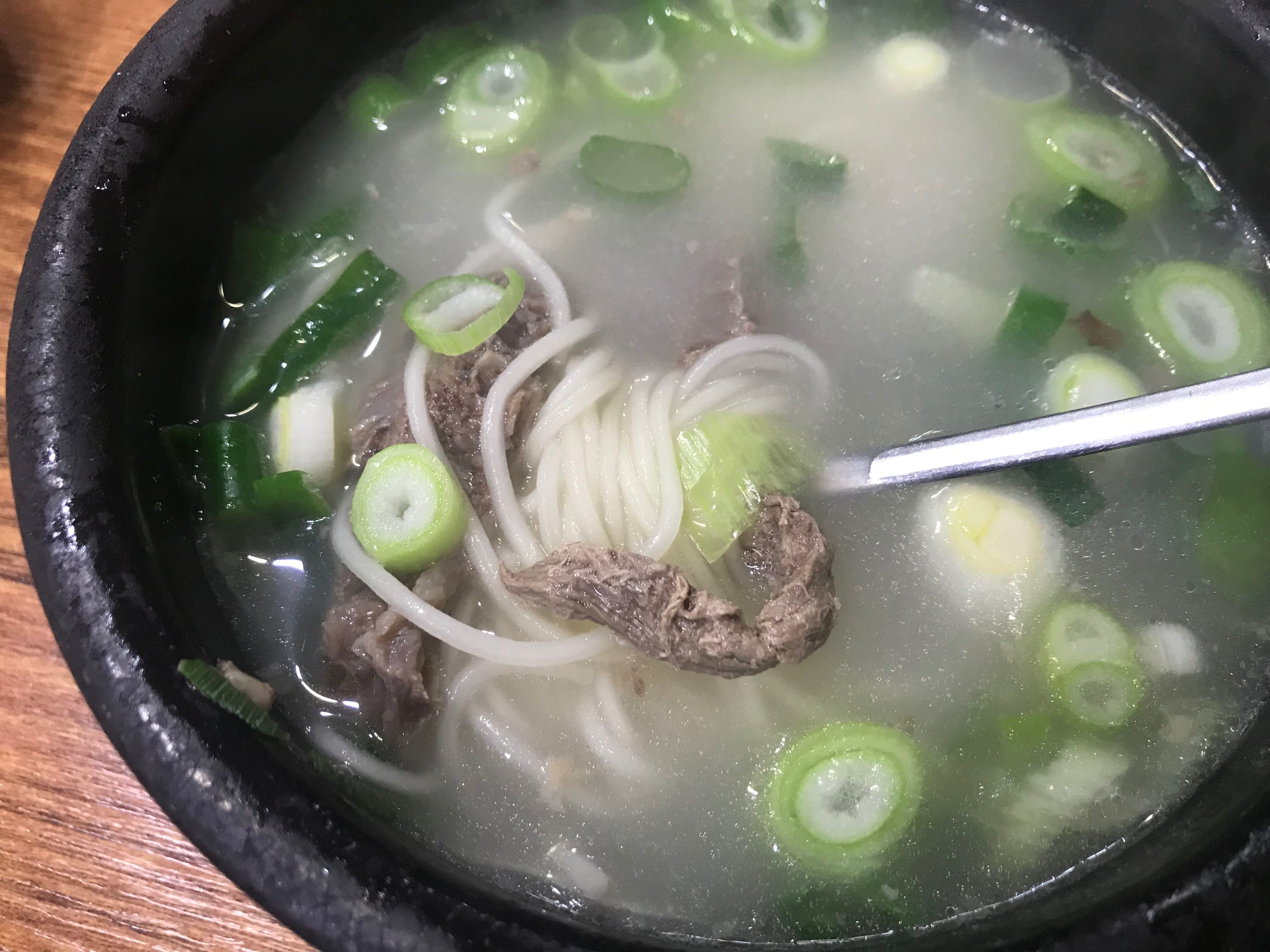

In the Joseon period, Koreans regularly made nationwide sacrifices to their ancestors, such as Dangun (the legendary founder of the kingdom of Gojoseon). The nationwide sacrifice was called sŏnnongje (선농제; 先農祭, sŏnnong meaning "venerated farmer"), and the altar for the sacrifice was called sŏnnongdan (선농단; 先農壇), which dates back to the Silla period.

King Seongjong had visited the sacrifice himself, and had eaten a meal with the people of Joseon. To increase the food supply in Joseon, King Seongjong ordered them to invent dishes that could feed the maximum number of people using the fewest ingredients, and seonnongtang (tang meaning "soup") was one of these.

Another historical opinion precedes the Joseon period concerning the origin of seolleongtang. According to this, the food was originated by the Mongolian invasion of Korea during the 13th century. The Mongolian food sulen is sliced and boiled beef with green onions, which developed into seolleongtang in Korea.

Seonnongtang is now called seolleongtang for easier pronunciation. The phonetic values have changed as follows:

- Seonnongtang (선농탕, sŏnnongt'ang) > seollongtang (설롱탕, sŏllongt'ang) > seolleongtang (설렁탕, sŏllŏngt'ang)

The first change is a consonant liquidization making the two "N" sounds into softer "L" sounds for easy pronunciation. The second change is a vowel harmonization of the "O" sound affected by the "Ŏ" sound.

Among common misbeliefs related to the dish, the name may come from its snowy white color and hearty taste, so seolleongtang was "雪濃湯" in Hanja (literally "snowy thick soup"). Therefore, several Korean dictionaries say that the Hanja spelling such as 雪濃湯 is an incorrect usage for the dish. Nevertheless, the misspelling is used to refer to the soup in Hanja.

The oldest extant restaurant in South Korea, Imun Seolnongtang, serves the dish. The restaurant's name contains an archaic spelling of seollongtang.

== Gallery ==
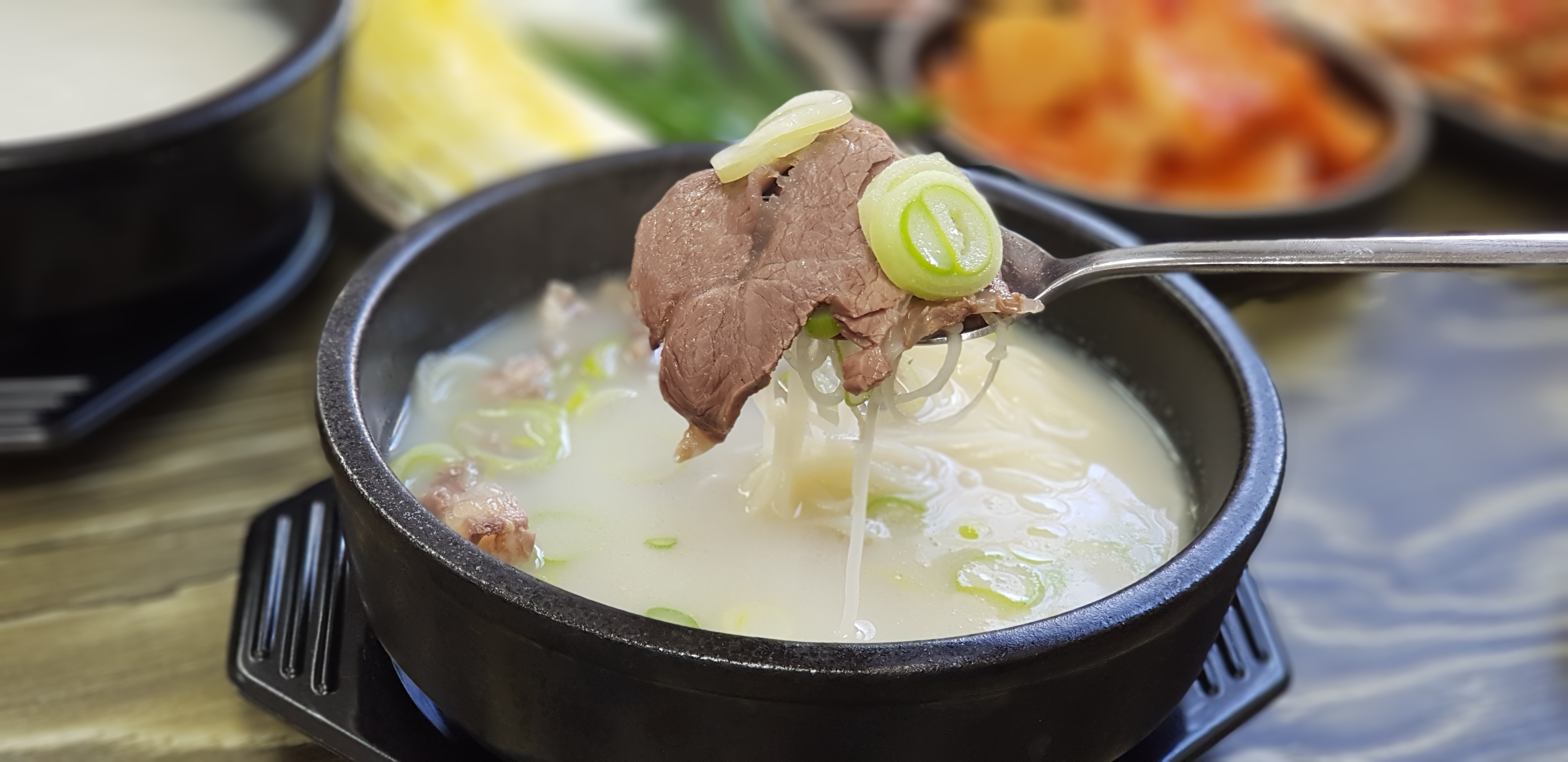

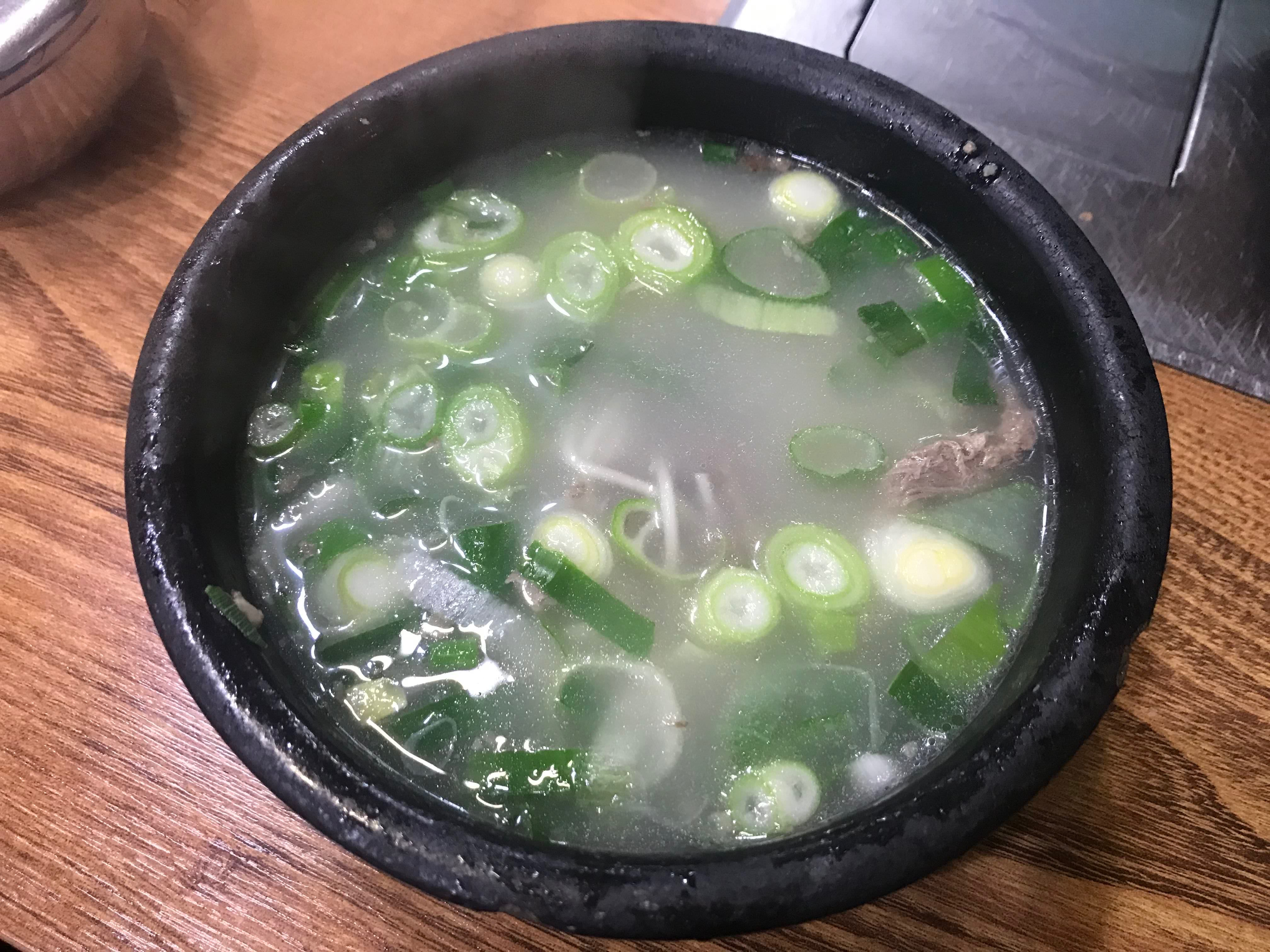

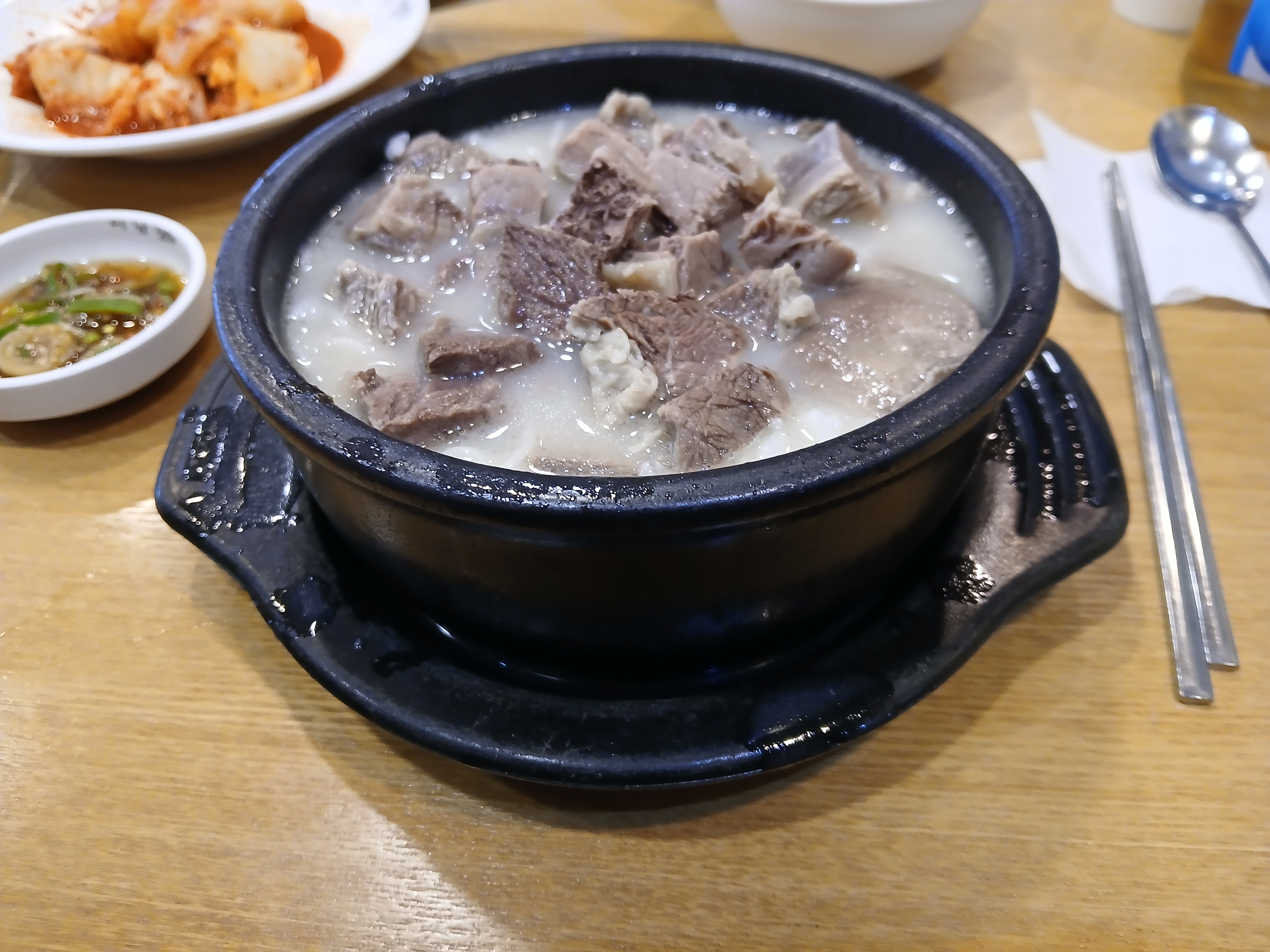

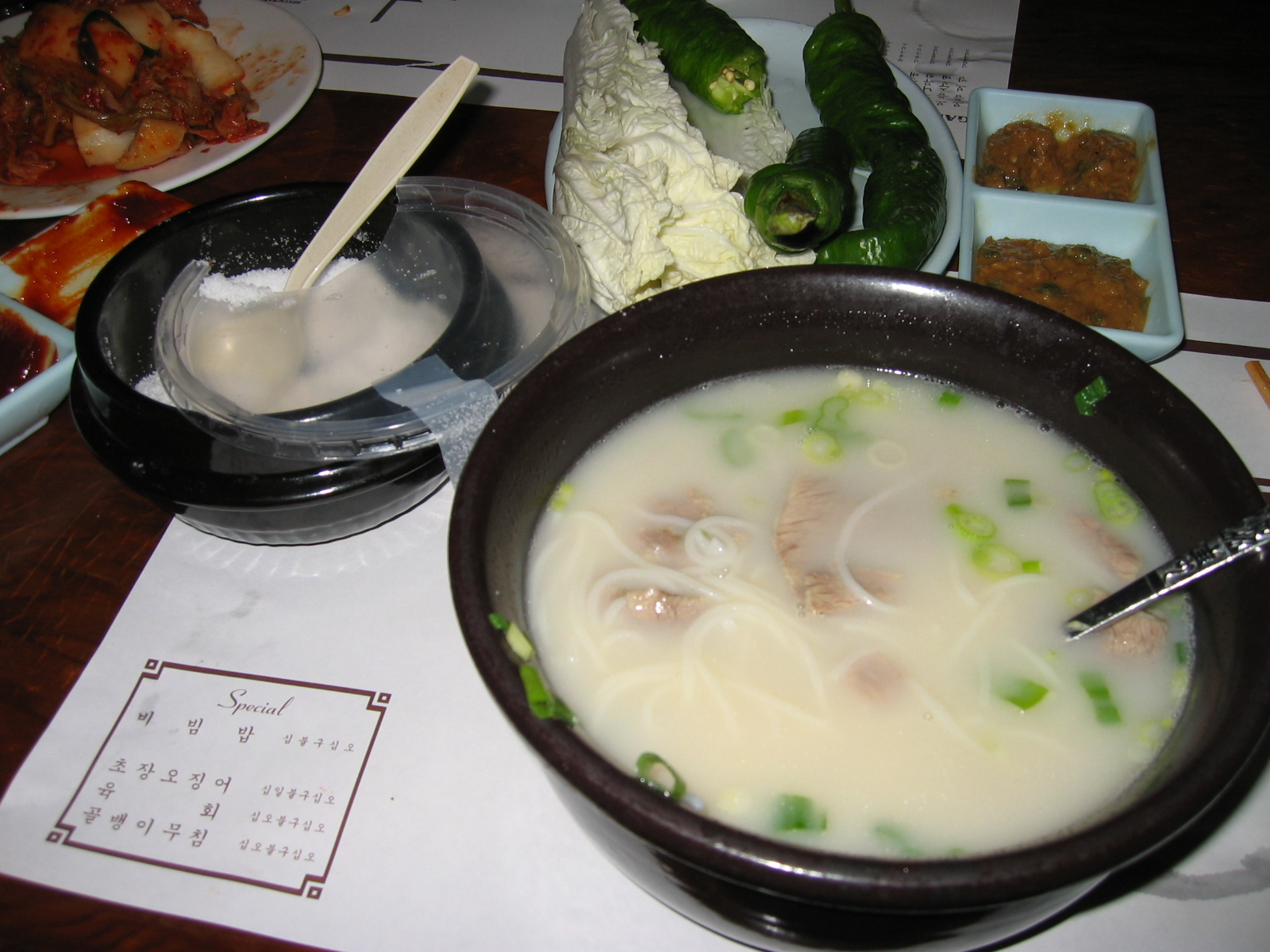

== See also ==
- Galbitang, beef short rib soup
- Samgyetang, chicken ginseng soup
- Haejangguk, soups eaten as a hangover remedy
- Gomguk
- Guk
- Korean cuisine
- List of Korean dishes
- List of soups
