= Jijimi (disambiguation) =

Jijimi is a type of Korean stew made by boiling meat, fish or vegetables.

Jijimi may also refer to:

- Jeon (food), sometimes considered a type of buchimgae (jijimi or jijim).
- Buchimgae, also known as jijimi or jijim.
