= Siraegi =

Dried radish stems in Korean cuisine

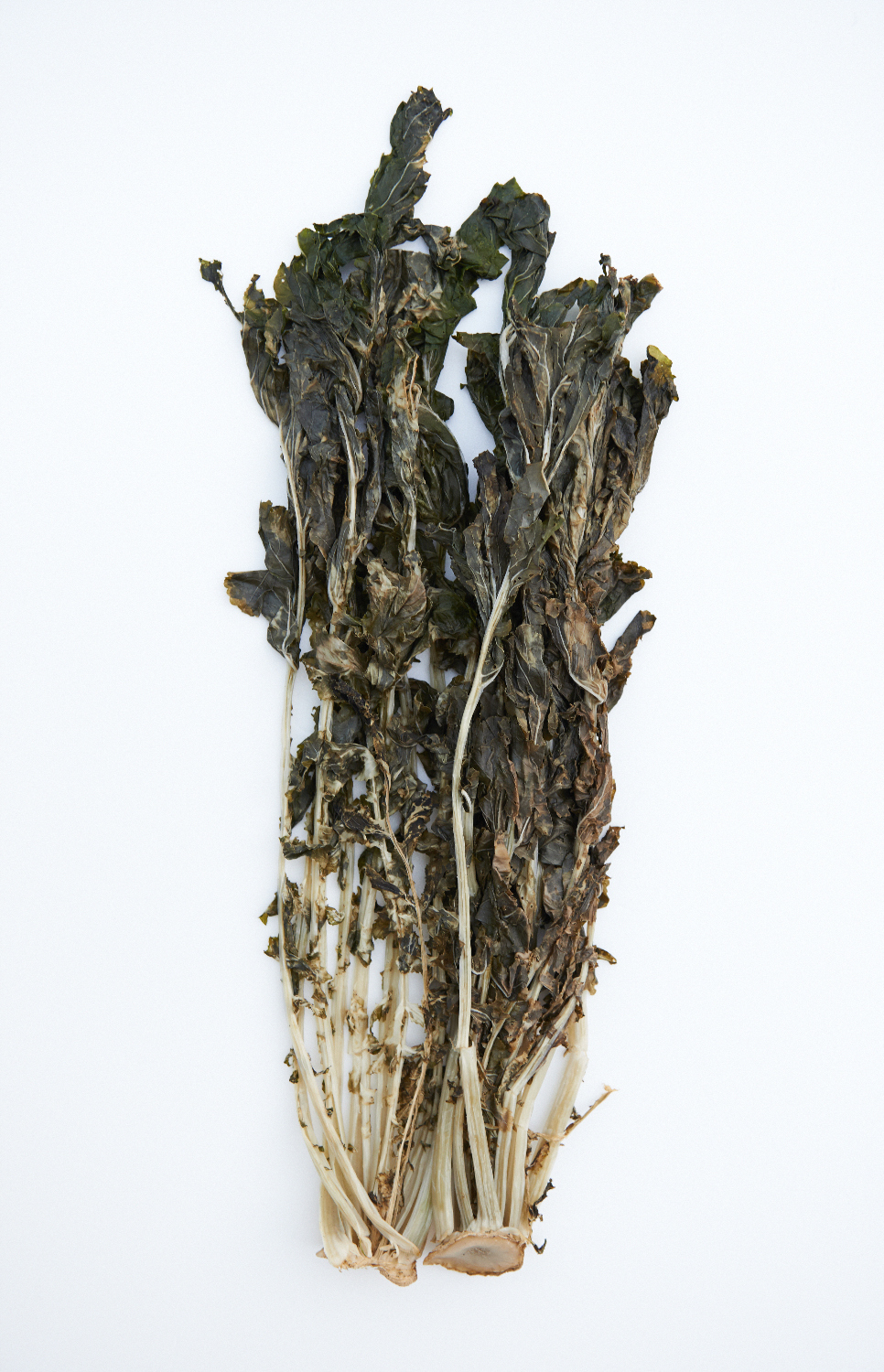
- Siraegi (dried radish greens)
- Place of origin: Korea
- Associated cuisine: Korean cuisine
- Main ingredients: Korean radish greens
- Similar dishes: Ugeoji

Korean name
- Hangul: 시래기
- RR: siraegi
- MR: siraegi
- IPA: [ɕi.ɾɛ.ɡi]

Siraegi (Korean: 시래기) is a Korean ingredient prepared by drying the leaves and stems of a radish or, less commonly, of a napa cabbage. Siraegi refers to radish stems and leaves or the outer leaves of cabbage dried in the sun and wind.

== Siraegi dishes ==
- Siraegi-jijimi – a type of jijimi that is made by first cutting soaked siraegi into bite-size pieces, then seasoning it with doenjang (soybean paste), perilla oil, Cheongyang chili, and minced garlic, and finally stewing it in a broth made from dried Alaska pollock (myeongtae) head, kelp, and anchovy in tteumul water (the water left from washing rice).
- Siraegi-doenjang-jigae – a type of doenjang-jjigae (soybean paste stew) made by cutting soaked siraegi into bite-size pieces, massaging it with the mixture of doenjang (soybean paste), chili powder and minced garlic, and boiling it with scallions, red chili, shiitake mushrooms, and cubed tofu in anchovy broth.
- Siraegi-namul – a type of namul, made by boiling siraegi, slicing it in bite-size pieces, seasoning it with soup soy sauce, sesame oil, and minced garlic, and finally stir-frying it with chopped scallions. It is served with toasted sesame seeds sprinkled on top. It is one of the boreum-namul (full moon namul) eaten on Daeboreum (the first full moon of the Korean calendar).

== Gallery ==
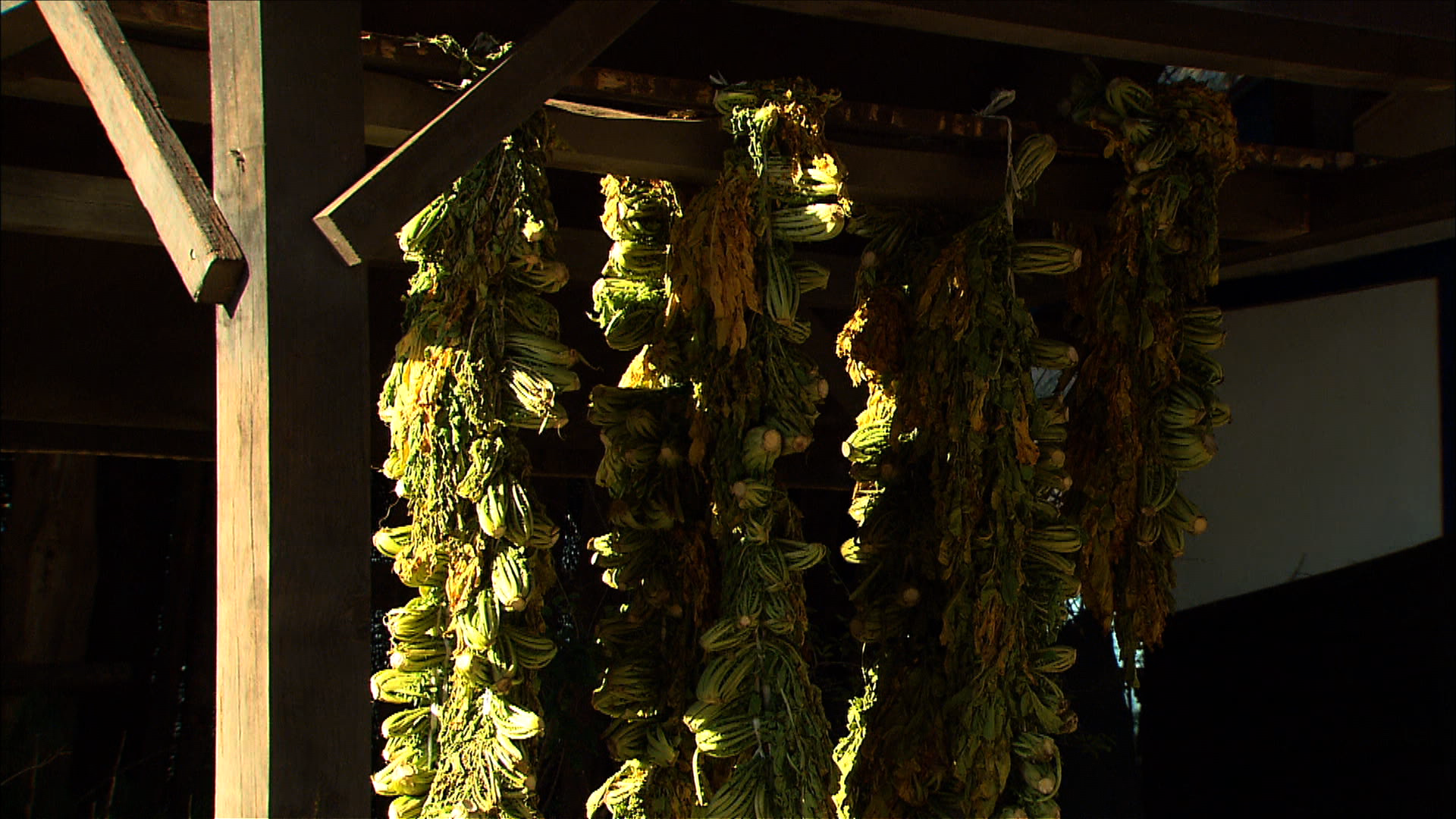
Drying mucheong (radish greens) to make siraegi

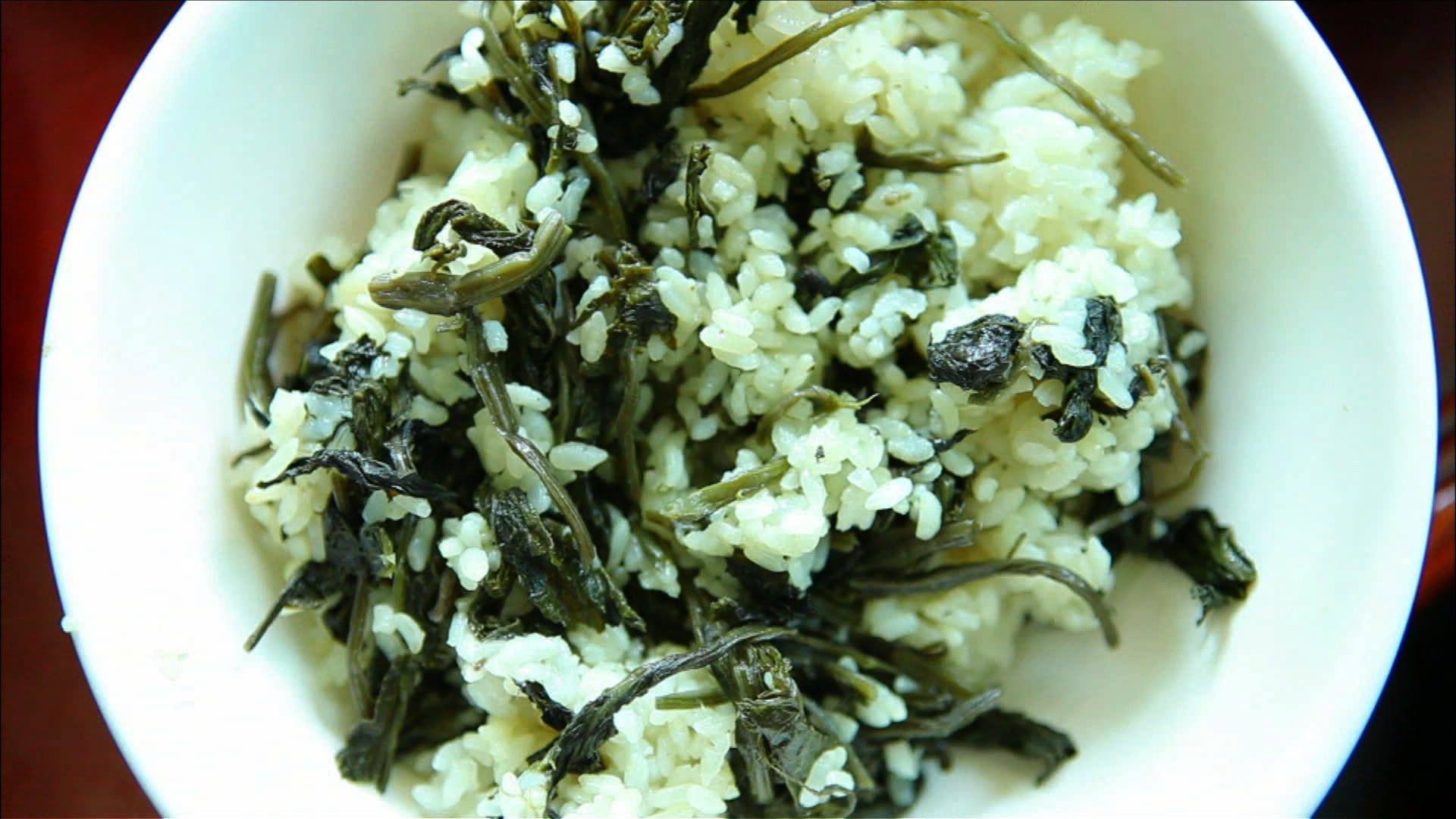
Siraegi-bap (dried radish greens rice)

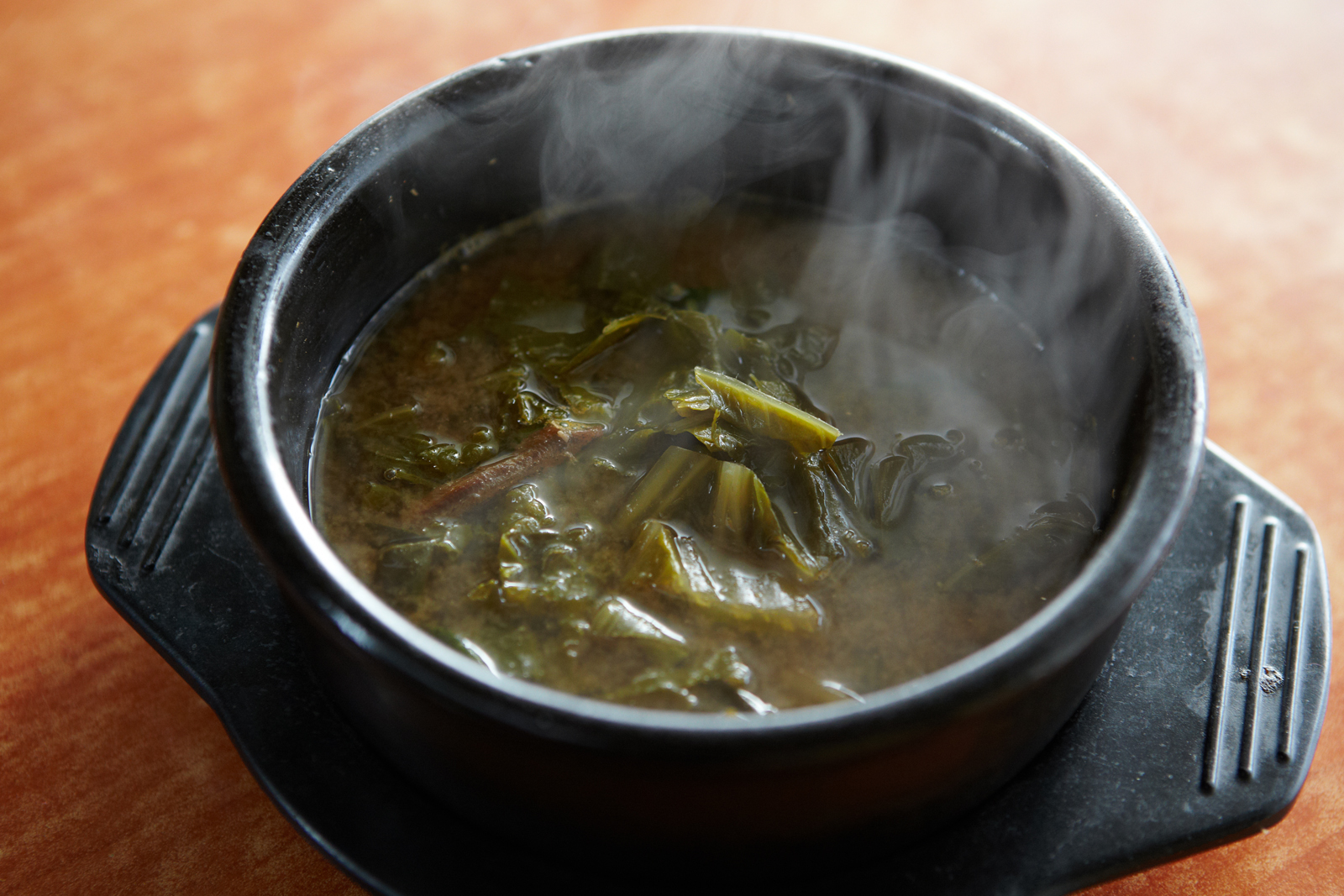
Siraegi-guk (dried radish green soup)

== See also ==
- Ugeoji
