= Jijimi =

Korean stew

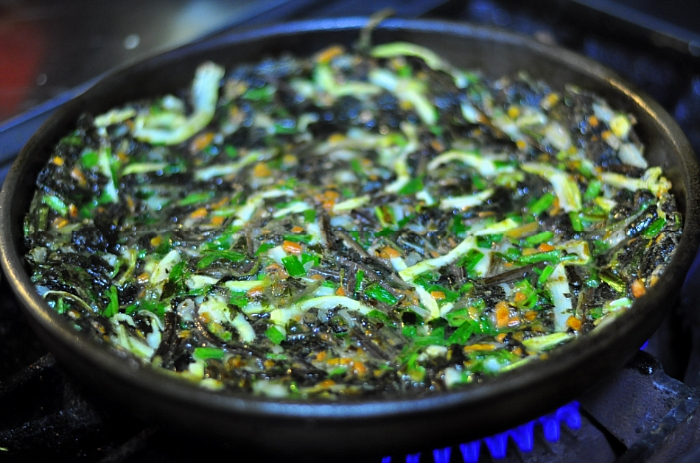
- San-namul-jijimi, a jijimi made with san-namul (mountain vegetables)
- Type: Stew
- Place of origin: Korea
- Associated cuisine: Korean cuisine
- Similar dishes: Guk, jjigae, jeongol

Korean name
- Hangul: 지짐이
- RR: jijimi
- MR: chijimi
- IPA: [tɕi.dʑi.mi]

Jijimi (Korean: 지짐이) is a type of Korean stew made by boiling meat, fish or vegetables. It is thicker than guk, but thinner than jjigae. Joseon mussang sinsik yori jebeop, the first color-printed Korean cookbook published in 1924, states that "Jijimi tastes better than guk, and jjigae tastes better than jijimi, being smaller in quantity and savorier."

== Types ==
- amchi-jijimi (암치지짐이) – female brown croaker stew
- bak-jijimi (박지짐이) – calabash stew
- bangeo-jijimi (방어지짐이) – amberjack stew
- biut-jijimi (비웃지짐이) – herring stew
- byeongeo-jijimi (병어지짐이) – silver pomfret stew
- dak-jijimi (닭지짐이) – chicken stew
- gajae-jijimi (가재지짐이) – crayfish stew
- gajami-jijimi (가자미지짐이) – righteye flounder stew
- ge-jijimi (게지짐이) – crab stew
- hobak-jijimi (호박지짐이) – Korean zucchini stew
- hobaksun-jijimi (호박순지짐이) – pumpkin shoots stew
- ingeo-jijimi (잉어지짐이) – carp stew
- jagasari-jijimi (자가사리지짐이) – torrent catfish stew
- jeonbok-jijimi (전복지짐이) – abalone stew
- jeyuk-jijimi (제육지짐이) – pork stew
- jogi-jijimi (조기지짐이) – yellow croaker stew
- megi-jijimi (메기지짐이) – Amur catfish stew
- mennamul-jijimi (멧나물지짐이) – mountain namul stew
- mineo-jijimi (민어지짐이) – croaker stew
- miyeok-jijimi (미역지짐이) – seaweed stew
- mu-jijimi (무지짐이) – radish stew
- oi-jijimi (오이지짐이) – cucumber stew
- saengi-jijimi (생이지짐이) – freshwater shrimp stew
- saeu-jijimi (새우지짐이) – shrimp stew
- siraegi-jijimi (시래기지짐이) – radish greens stew
- soejok-jijimi (쇠족지짐이) – cow's trotters stew
- ssogari-jijimi (쏘가리지짐이) – golden mandarin fish stew
- ttukkal-jijimi (뚜깔지짐이) – golden lace stew
- ugeoji-jijimi (우거지지짐이) – cabbage outer leaves stew
- wakjeogi (왁적이) – radish stew
