= Baroo (restaurant) =

Korean restaurant in Los Angeles, California, U.S.

- Interactive map of Baroo

Restaurant information
- Established: 2015
- Owners: Kwang Uh; Mina Park
- Food type: Korean
- Location: 905 E. 2nd St. #109, Los Angeles, California, 90012, United States
- Coordinates: 34.0472°N 118.2347°W
- Website: baroolosangeles.com

Baroo is a Korean restaurant in the Arts District neighborhood of Los Angeles, California, United States. Founded by Kwang Uh and his wife Mina Park, Baroo began in a Hollywood strip mall in 2015 and reopened in the Arts District in September 2023.

In 2024, the Los Angeles Times named Baroo its restaurant of the year.

== Description ==
The exterior is composed of black-and-white walls and concrete floors.

=== Menu ===
Baroo serves Korean cuisine. Its menu contains a fried lobster with doenjang-jjigae, soy-braised back cod, and a rib steak served with kimchi. Vegan options are also available.

== History ==
Baroo was founded by Kwang Uh in a Hollywood strip mall in 2015. The original location closed in October 2018, before Uh and his wife, Mina Park, founded a stall in East Hollywood in 2019 named Baroo Canteen. After its closure, they reopened Baroo on September 5, 2023, in the Arts District neighborhood.

== Reception ==
Baroo was Los Angeles Times's restaurant of the year in 2024.

== See also ==
- List of Korean restaurants
