= Budae-jjigae =

South Korean spicy stew

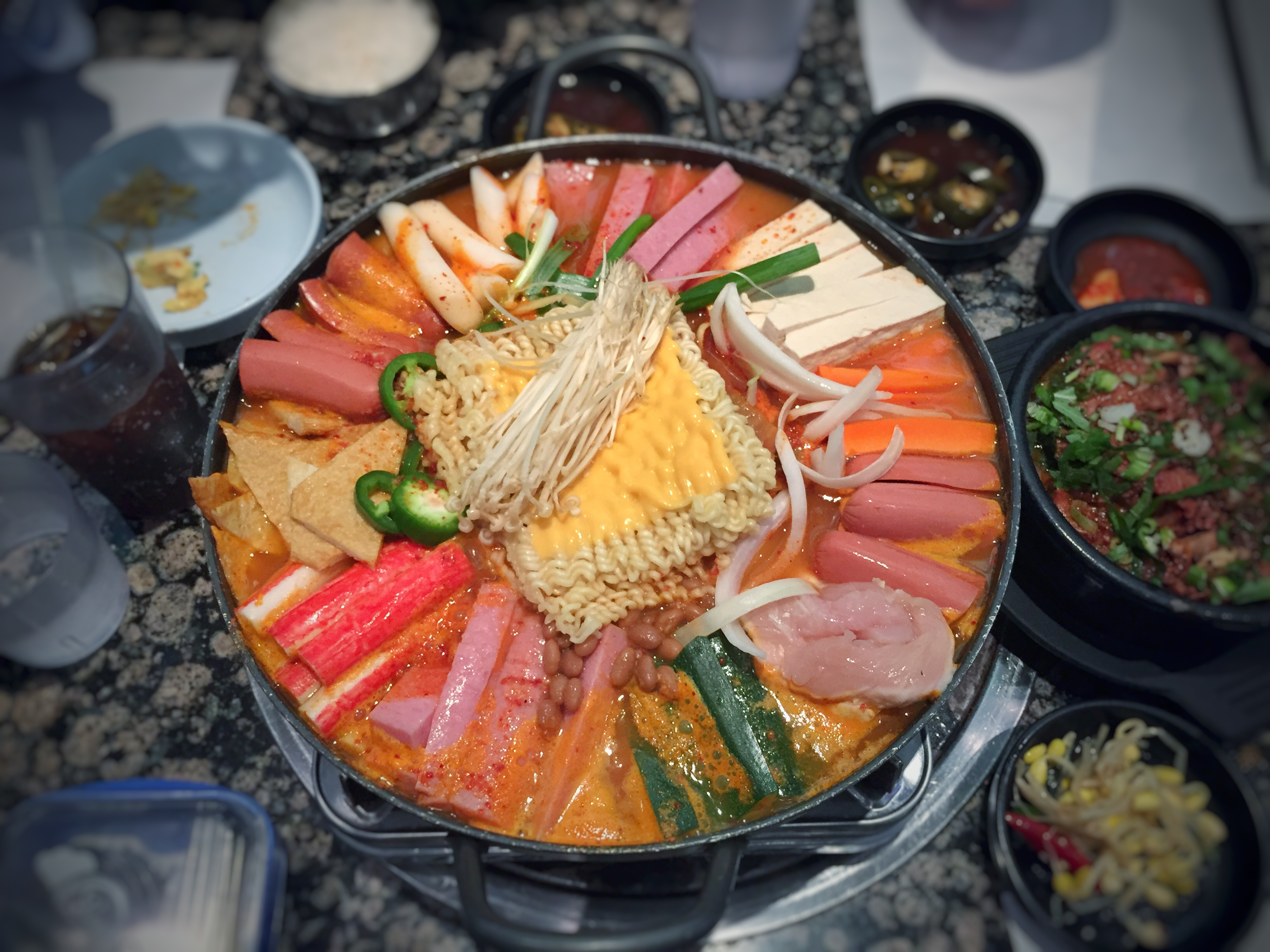
- Alternative names: Army base stew, army stew, spicy sausage stew
- Type: Jjigae
- Place of origin: South Korea
- Region or state: Uncertain, possibly Uijeongbu
- Associated cuisine: South Korean
- Invented: 1950s
- Main ingredients: Ham, sausage, Spam, baked beans, kimchi, instant noodles, gochujang, American cheese

Korean name
- Hangul: 부대찌개
- Hanja: 部隊찌개
- RR: budaejjigae
- MR: pudaetchigae
- IPA: pu.dɛ.t͈ɕi.ɡɛ

Budae-jjigae (Korean: 부대찌개; lit. 'army base stew') is a type of spicy jjigae (Korean stew) from South Korea that is made with a variety of ingredients, often canned or processed. Common ingredients include ham, sausage, Spam, baked beans, kimchi, instant noodles, gochujang, and American cheese. The dish is now a popular anju (accompaniment to alcoholic drinks) and a comfort food cooked in a large pot shared by a group of people. It also goes by the English names army stew, army base stew, and spicy sausage stew.

The dish has its origins in a predecessor often called kkulkkuri-juk (꿀꿀이죽; lit. 'piggy porridge') that was created around the time of the Korean War, when South Korea was experiencing significant poverty. A prominent ingredient of the dish, Spam, was only made legally available for sale in 1987, around the time that South Korea democratized.

Although the dish came from conditions of poverty, it has remained consistently popular, even during and after South Korea's rapid economic growth. Its low cost, flexibility, and simplicity have been praised. In South Korea, there are many restaurants that specialize in budae-jjigae. Gyeonggi Province's city of Uijeongbu, which claims to have first made the dish, has a "Uijeongbu Budae-jjigae Street" with a high concentration of specialty restaurants. Chains like Nolboo have operated over a thousand locations in the country.

== Name ==
The word budae (부대) refers to military camps. The suffix -jjigae (찌개) refers to a type of stew that has a thicker consistency than guk (soup) and has more ingredients. Its name is sometimes translated as "army base stew", "army stew", "spicy sausage stew", or "sausage stew".

== Description ==
Budae-jjigae is made with a wide variety of ingredients. The soup base can be plain water, although most prefer to make it with a fish, meat, or bone-based broth such as sagol-yuksu (사골육수; lit. 'sagol broth'). Common ingredients include ham, sausage, lunch meats (e.g. Spam), baked beans, kimchi (fermented vegetables), instant ramen noodles, spicy flavoring packs that come with the ramen, cellophane noodles, gochujang (pepper paste), Vienna sausages, bacon, tofu, pork, ground beef, mandu (dumplings), macaroni, tteok (rice cakes), American cheese, mozzarella, minari (water celery), scallions, chili peppers, garlic, corn, zucchini, mushrooms, and other in-season vegetables. Spam or similar lunch meats are often described as a central part of the dish.

=== Preparation ===
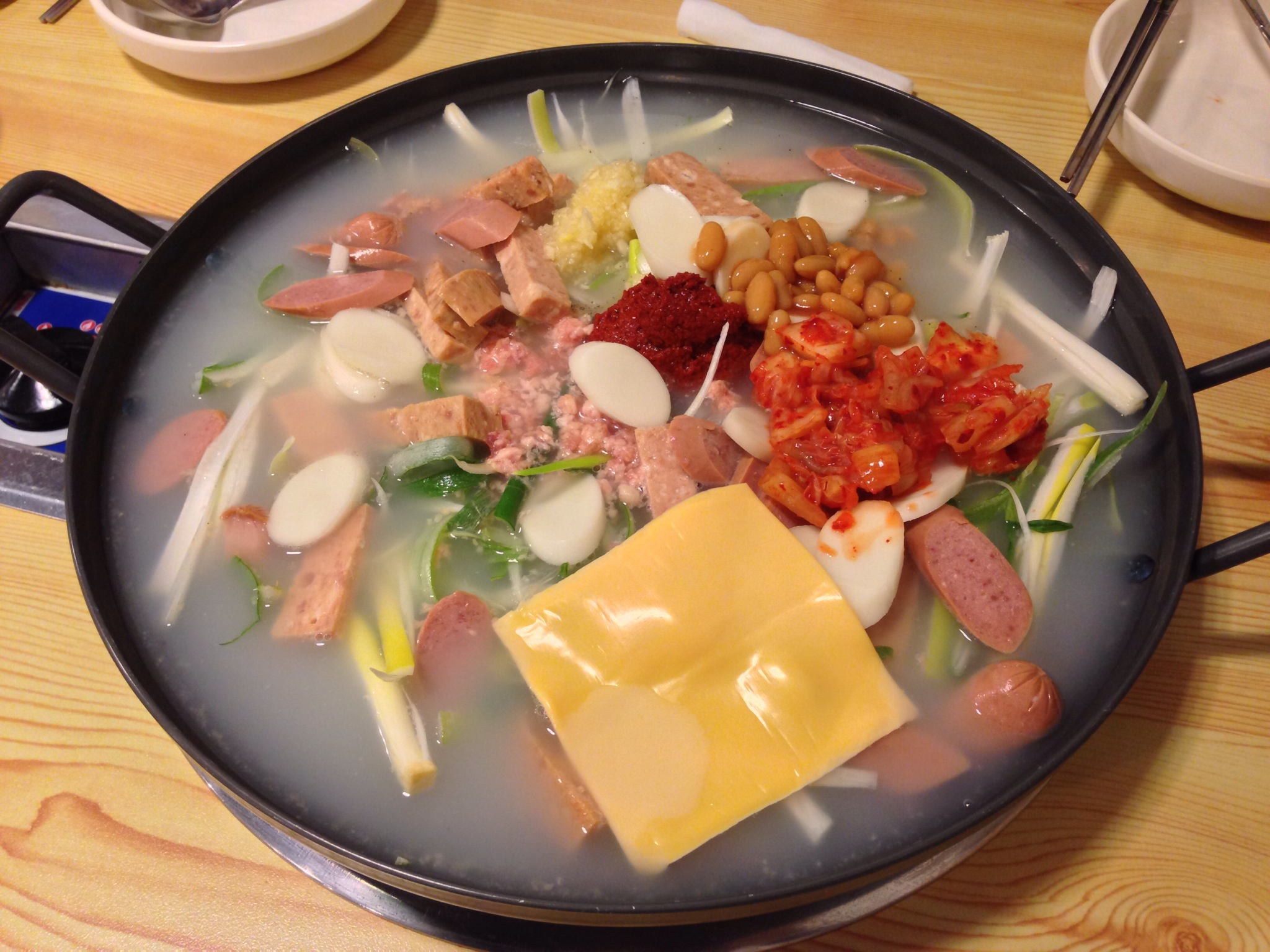
Ingredients, seasoning paste, and stock in pot before boiling

The dish is based on a stock or soup base, which can be either vegan or made with animal products. Seasoning paste is also used and usually contains gochujang and other flavorants such as soy sauce and sugar. Chopped ingredients and noodles are then added to the stock, with variability on whether the noodles are added before or after the liquid comes to a boil.

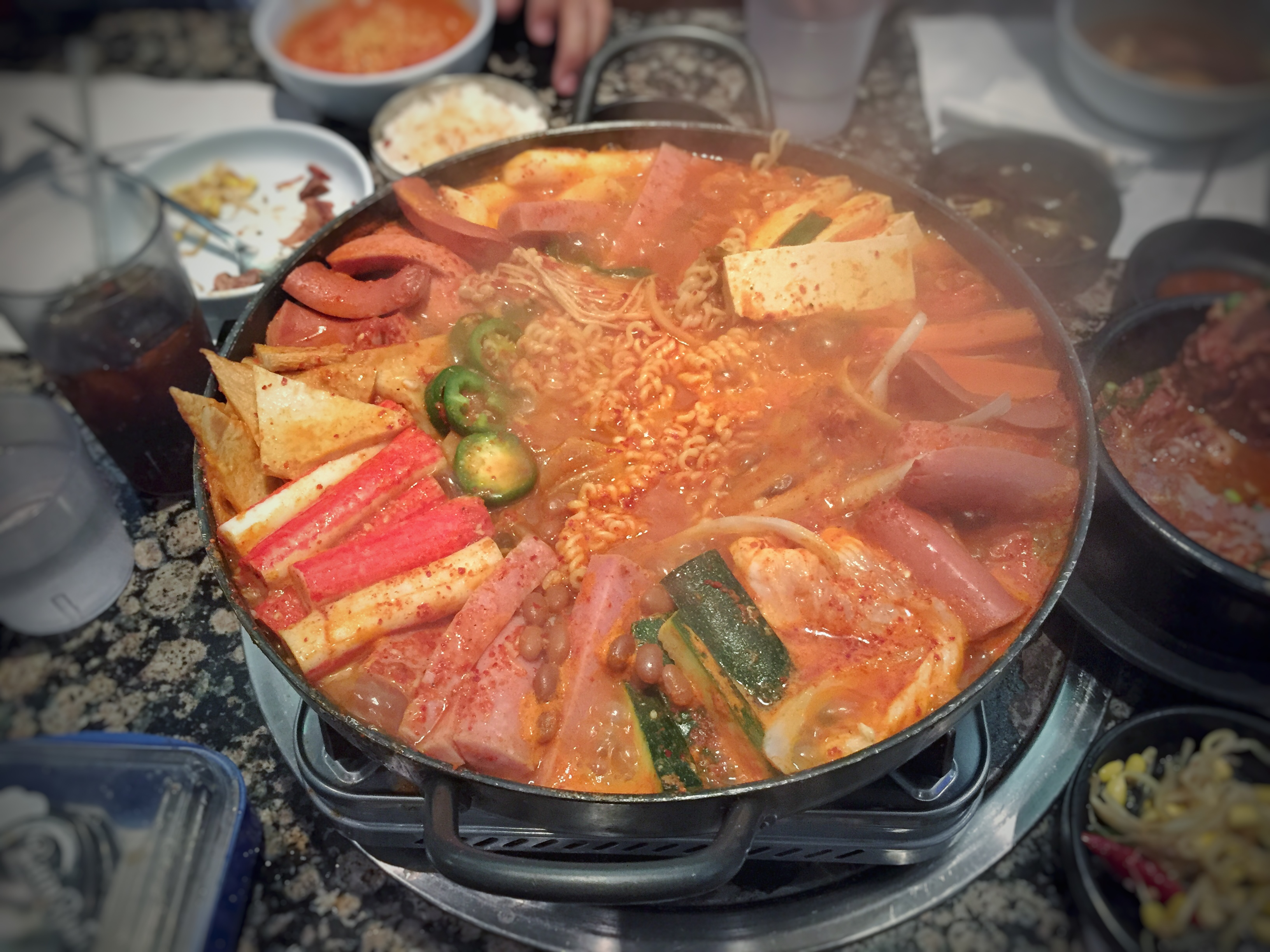
Budae-jjigae being cooked communally in a restaurant (2016)

The dish is often enjoyed communally, with multiple people sharing a pot. In restaurants, the dish comes with a set of base ingredients; more can be added for additional charge. The low cost of the ingredients, flexibility of the recipe, and ease of preparation have been praised.

=== Variants ===
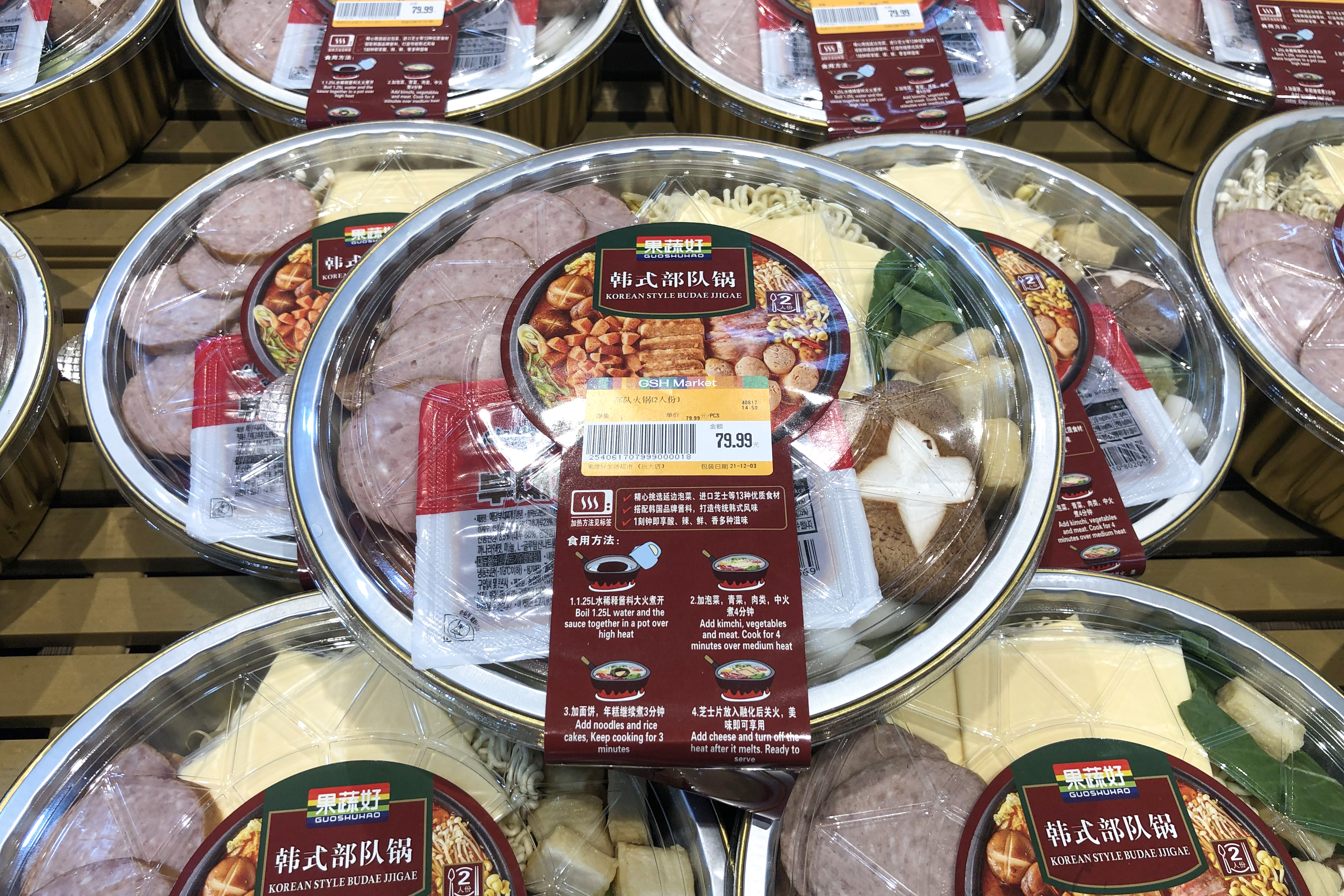
Prepackaged ingredients for making budae-jjigae being sold in China (2021)

Ingredients for the dish are sold and exported from South Korea to other countries in kits. Various restaurants create their own versions of the dish with unorthodox ingredients. For example, it was reported in 2022 that a restaurant in Apgujeong used tomato soup as a base. Another restaurant in Uijeongbu, Gyeonggi Province that was opened in 1973 has a budae-gogi ("military base meat") stir-fry that has been described as "budae-jjigae without soup".

A variant of the dish is named after a U.S. President. A form of budae-jjigae developed in Yongsan District, Seoul is called Johnson-tang (존슨탕; Jonseuntang; lit. 'Johnson soup'), after Lyndon B. Johnson, who is said to have enjoyed the dish during his 1966 visit to South Korea. The restaurant Johnson ate the dish at, Bada Sikdang (바다식당), still serves Johnson-tang as its signature dish. In Johnson-tang, kimchi is replaced with plain napa cabbage leaves, and ramen noodles are not added. Cheese is included by default, rather than being a requested addition (as is the case in some restaurants). In addition, while many budae-jjigae restaurants cook the dish at the table, Johnson-tang is served already cooked.

There are Uijeongbu and Songtan styles of the dish. The Uijeongbu style uses barley-based gochujang, and has been described as having a thicker and spicier broth. The Songtan style prominently features napa cabbage.

Some opt to exclude or substitute some of its salty, preserved, or perceived low-quality ingredients. Vegan varieties of the dish exist.

== History ==
=== Background ===
The 20th century was turbulent for the Korean peninsula. In 1945, Korea was liberated from its status as a colony of the Empire of Japan. Koreans had been exploited; for example, from 1939 to 1945, around 700,000–800,000 Koreans were moved to Japan to work in slavery-like conditions. The situation was made worse due to the collapse of the economy that had been run by imperial Japan, and the subsequent division of Korea between the Soviet Civil Administration in the North and the United States Army Military Government in the South. The difficulties did not stop; around 10% of the population died during the Korean War, which greatly disrupted the economy and society. By the end of the war, South Korea was one of the poorest countries in the world. Around that time, many Koreans depended on international aid for survival.

Many foreign products were not legally available to South Koreans, and some were made artificially expensive due to tariffs even up until 1987. During a crackdown on black market trading under the Park Chung Hee administration, smuggling food like Spam was a crime punishable by death. To circumvent this, goods were smuggled off bases. Canned goods were particularly prized for their long shelf life. Black markets called "Yankee markets" (양키시장; Yangki-sijang) formed that specialized in the trade of these goods. Some of these markets still exist today, including one in Incheon, although they are now regular markets.

=== Kkulkkuri-juk ===
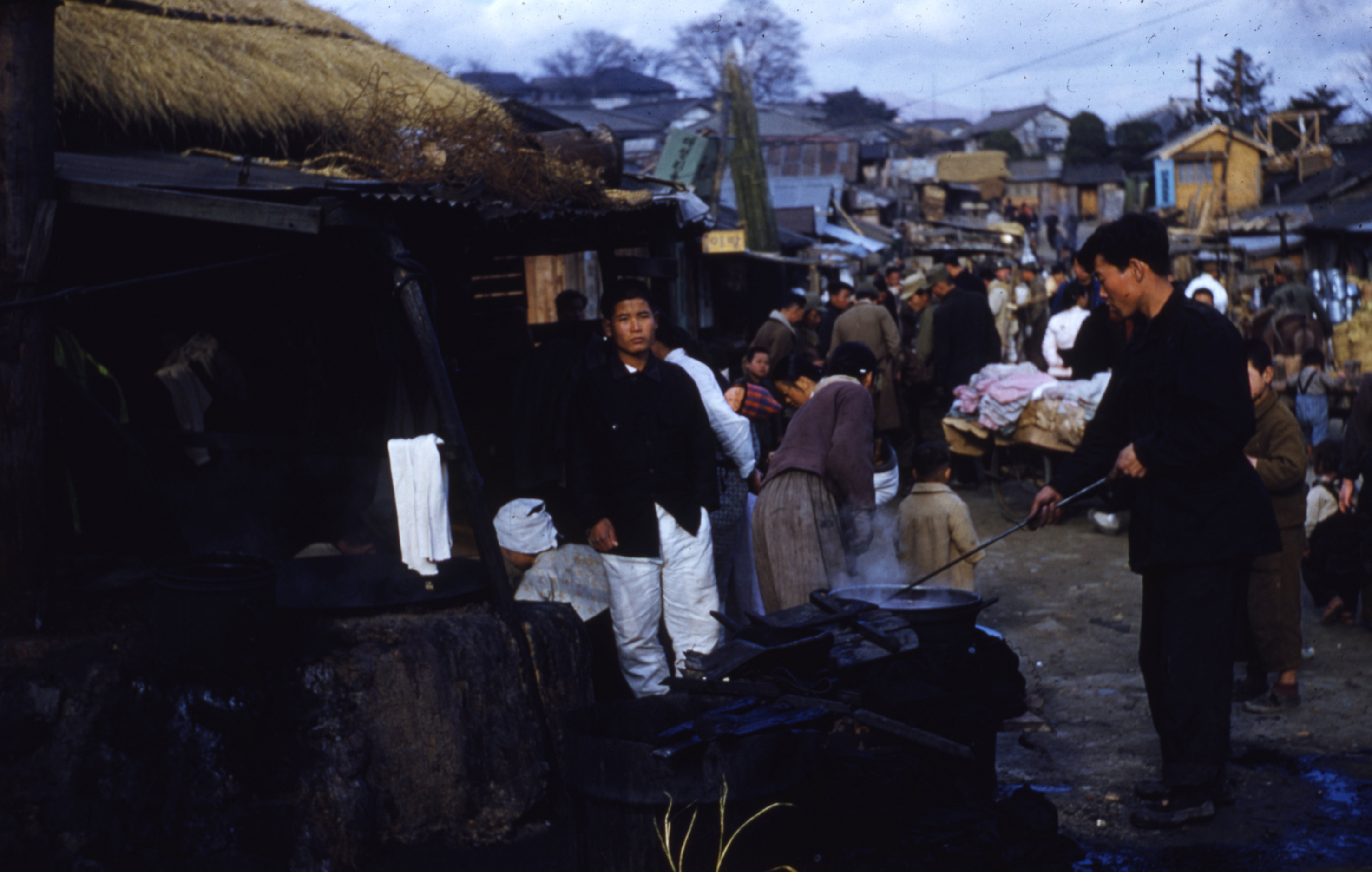
A man (right) cooking kkulkkuri-juk in Burim Market, Changwon (1952)

A predecessor to the dish is often called kkulkkuri-juk (꿀꿀이죽; lit. 'piggy porridge'), although it may have additionally gone by "UN Stew" (as in "United Nations"; 유엔탕; 유엔湯; yuen-tang). Its ingredients and method of cooking were more inconsistent than its successor's. One variant of the dish is attested to in the Pusan Perimeter. It was made with butter, canned pineapples, cabbages, onions, American cheese, and the occasional piece of meat (these rare pieces of scrap meat were often described as 부대고기; budae-gogi; lit. 'military base meat').

The dish used American sausages, which tend to be greasier and saltier than Korean ones. Modern budae-jjigae is instead made with milder ingredients, and seasoning is added to the soup. It also lacked instant ramen, as ramen had not yet reached Korea by then. Coincidentally, Jeon Jung-yun (전중윤) cited the poor quality of kkulkkuri-juk as an inspiration for why he created the first domestic instant ramen brand Samyang Ramen. Jeon says he deliberately set ramen's price as low as possible, in order to make it accessible to people who would otherwise eat kkulkkuri-juk.

A number of people have recalled that, while the dish was highly sought after and enjoyed when consumed, its actual quality was poor in hindsight, especially because it was sometimes made with food scraps picked out of garbage from the military bases. One significant and common issue was the presence of inedible objects. The ends of cigarettes, toothpicks, and tissues could be found in the mix. In 2010, Lee Si-yeon recalled an incident from his boyhood, when he worked at Camp Henry: (Note: "나는 어느 날 용기를 내서 부대의 군목(軍牧)을 찾아갔다. '압'이라는 소령이었다. 압 소령 앞에서 나는 짧은 영어로 군부대에서 나오는 음식 찌꺼기를 한국인들이 먹고 있으니, 제발 오물을 버리지 말아 달라고 부탁했다... 압 소령은 '같이 한번 가서 보자'고 했다. 나는 괜한 이야기를 꺼내서 앞으로 '음식 찌꺼기 반출을 금지하면 어쩌나' 하는 생각에 마음이 조마조마했다... 나를 따라 시장에 온 압 소령은 꿀꿀이죽을 한 그릇 사서 먹기 시작했다. 죽을 먹는 그의 두 눈에는 눈물이 그렁그렁 맺혔다. 말없이 한 그릇을 다 비운 압 소령이 이튿날 내가 있는 캠프를 찾아왔다. 압 소령은 '부대에서 나오는 음식 찌꺼기를 한국인들이 먹고 있으니 앞으로는 이물질이 들어가지 않도록 주의하라'는 공문을 전 미군 부대에 보냈다'고 말했다.")

One day, I mustered up the courage to speak to the military chaplain. He was a major called "Ap" (압). In simple English, I asked if they could not throw away food scraps, as Koreans were picking them out of the garbage... He said "Let me see this for myself". [I feared that he would ban Koreans from taking out the food scraps]... He followed me to the market, where he bought a bowl of kkulkkuri-juk and took a bite. Major Ap's eyes welled up with tears. He ate the whole bowl in silence. The next day, [he told me that he had sent] a notice to all U.S. military bases that read "Koreans are eating food scraps from the bases, so be cautious to not let foreign substances enter them."

Despite the low quality of the dish, many Koreans still could not afford it. According to Jeon, a bowl cost around 5 won in 1963 (equivalent to ₩293 in 2025). The dish persisted until the mid-1960s, when the economic situation somewhat improved.

=== Development of budae-jjigae ===
Since its development, budae-jjigae has remained consistently popular in South Korea. However, it is not known with certainty where the dish first arose; a number of restaurants and cities claim to be the origin. It even possibly arose independently in multiple places due to shared circumstances across South Korea.

According to sociolinguist Yang Minho, the dish was first made in the northern part of South Korea and later propagated south, following the early trajectory of the Korean War. Possible places of origin include the regions of Uijeongbu, Pyeongtaek, Munsan, and Dongducheon.

One person who claimed to be the original inventor was Heo Gi-Suk (허기숙), a North Korean defector. Heo worked at a fishcake stand in Uijeongbu, and occasionally encountered people who asked her to cook meats they had acquired from the nearby military base. She began by simply stirfrying the meats, but eventually turned the dish into a stew containing kimchi, lard, and wild sesame oil. Heo eventually opened a restaurant in 1960 called Odeng Sikdang (오뎅식당; lit. 'Fishcake Restaurant'), which nominally served fishcakes, but was popular for serving budae-jjigae. This drew the ire of the customs office, which confiscated her ingredients and charged her fines on a number of occasions. The restaurant reportedly had long lines as of 2013, despite multiple competitors close by. Heo died in 2014, but the restaurant was still open as of June 2020.

An article in the Encyclopedia of Korean Folk Culture claims that the dish was popular among factory workers in the 1960s and 1970s. However, according to one writer for the JoongAng Ilbo in 2016, the dish was not common in restaurants in the late 1960s. Another writer that published an article for the Cultural Heritage Administration in 2018 claimed that the dish did not reach national popularity until the 1970s.

In 1963, instant ramen entered the South Korean market, and eventually made its way into budae-jjigae. Over time, anchovy broth (flavored with gochujang and kimchi) began to be used as the base of the soup, a practice that has since persisted in some variations of budae-jjigae.

=== Recent history ===
After the June Democratic Struggle of 1987, South Korea finally democratized after decades of dictatorships. In addition, by then the economy was significantly improved in the wake of the South Korean economic miracle. Spam was legalized in that year, after a Korean company purchased the rights to make it locally. According to an article by Hahna Yoon in the BBC, it is around this time that the dish's status changed from survival food to comfort food. That same year, Nolboo (놀부), a restaurant franchise specializing in the dish, opened. As of June 2020, it operated around 1,000 locations across the country.

In recent years, modern variations such as budae-bokkeum as well as fusion flavors incorporating cream, rosé sauce, or malatang spices have emerged. The dish has also been adapted into home meal replacement and meal-kit products for home consumption.

== Spread ==
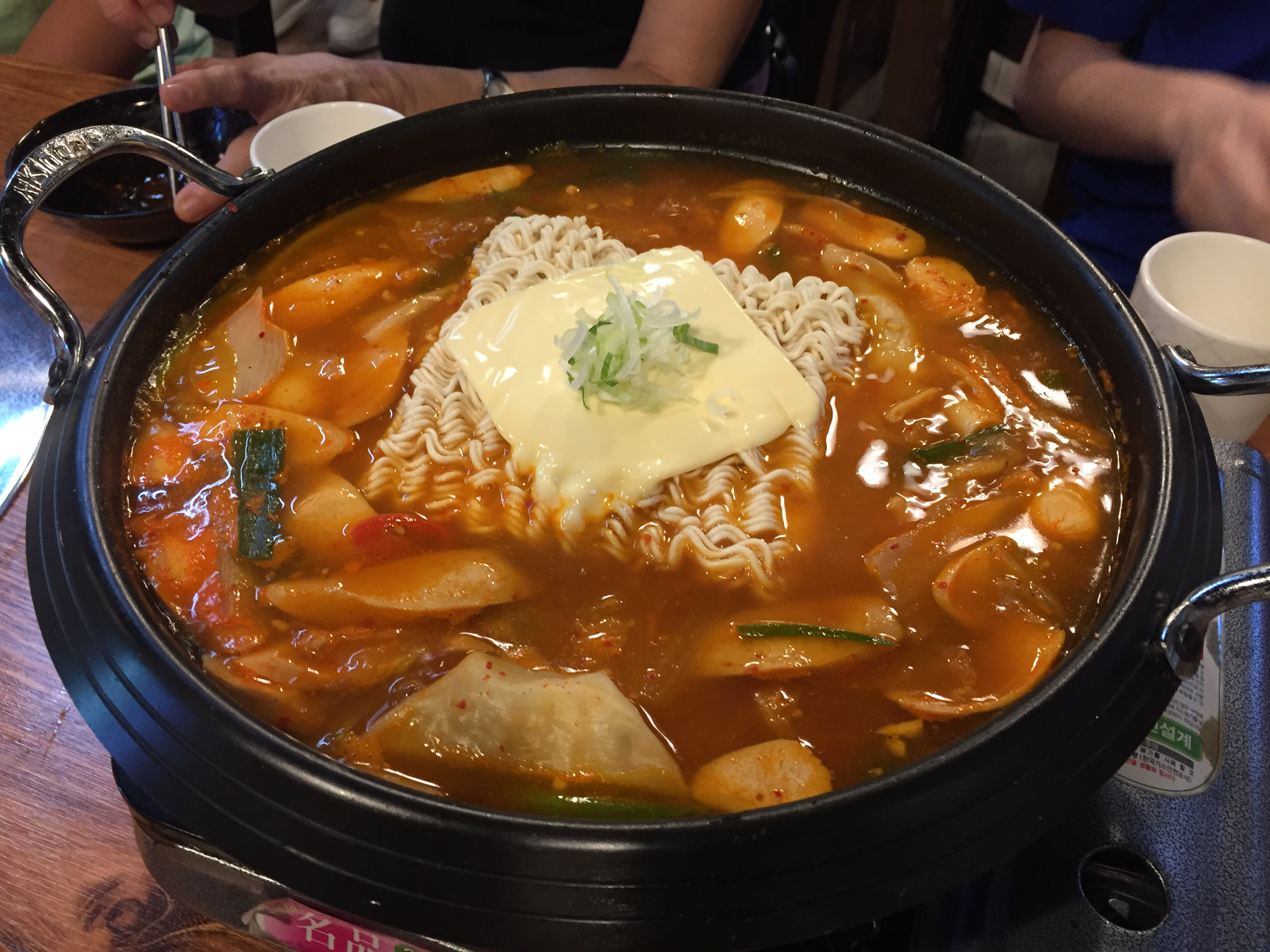
Budae-jjigae served in a restaurant in Singapore (2016)

The dish now has some international popularity. In a 2015 episode of Anthony Bourdain: Parts Unknown, Bourdain described the dish to journalist Anderson Cooper as "a classic example of necessity being the mother of deliciousness". Bourdain later featured the dish in his 2016 book Appetites: A Cookbook:

It's the ultimate dorm food. Just looking at the ingredients might make it sound like a horror, but it very quickly comes together and becomes delicious. It captures the essence of great cooking over the last few centuries: improvisational, born of war and hardship, nostalgic, sentimental, and transformative.

According to a 2016 survey conducted by the Korea Tourism Organization of 200,000 Chinese tourists to South Korea, budae-jjigae was most often ranked as their favorite dish that they ate in the country. In 2019, the Michelin Guide included the dish on a list of "Must-Eat Dishes in South Korea".

A number of restaurants in the United States have served the dish. This includes the Portland, Oregon, restaurant Han Oak, and the New York City restaurant Danji. The dish is served in some restaurants in Beijing, China; and Tokyo, Japan.

Budae-jjigae was brought by restaurateurs to North Korea in 2017 and became a popular dish there. In 2024, North Korea banned the sale of budae-jjigae, along with tteok-bokki, from sale in restaurants, because the dishes are of South Korean origin.

== Cultural legacy ==
Despite its widespread consumption, the dish has a somewhat mixed legacy. Some have noted that it evokes memories of a painful period in Korean history. In 2020, Cătălina Stanciu wrote that "[t]he transformation of the Korean people's trauma story is embodied through the bowl of budaejjigae". Some older Koreans call the dish "garbage stew" and avoid it, mostly because of its history and also because of its unhealthy ingredients. In 2014, anthropologist Grace M. Cho wrote of the dish:

I listened to the oral histories of Korean War survivors living in the United States, who spoke about the days during and after the war when they sought food outside U.S. Army bases. They recalled waiting in long lines outside the mess halls to buy bags of "leftovers", though some of them referred to the bags plainly as "garbage". They'd say things like, "Americans have the best food and throw it away, and then Koreans buy that garbage," their voices filled with humiliation, resentment, and gratitude all at once.

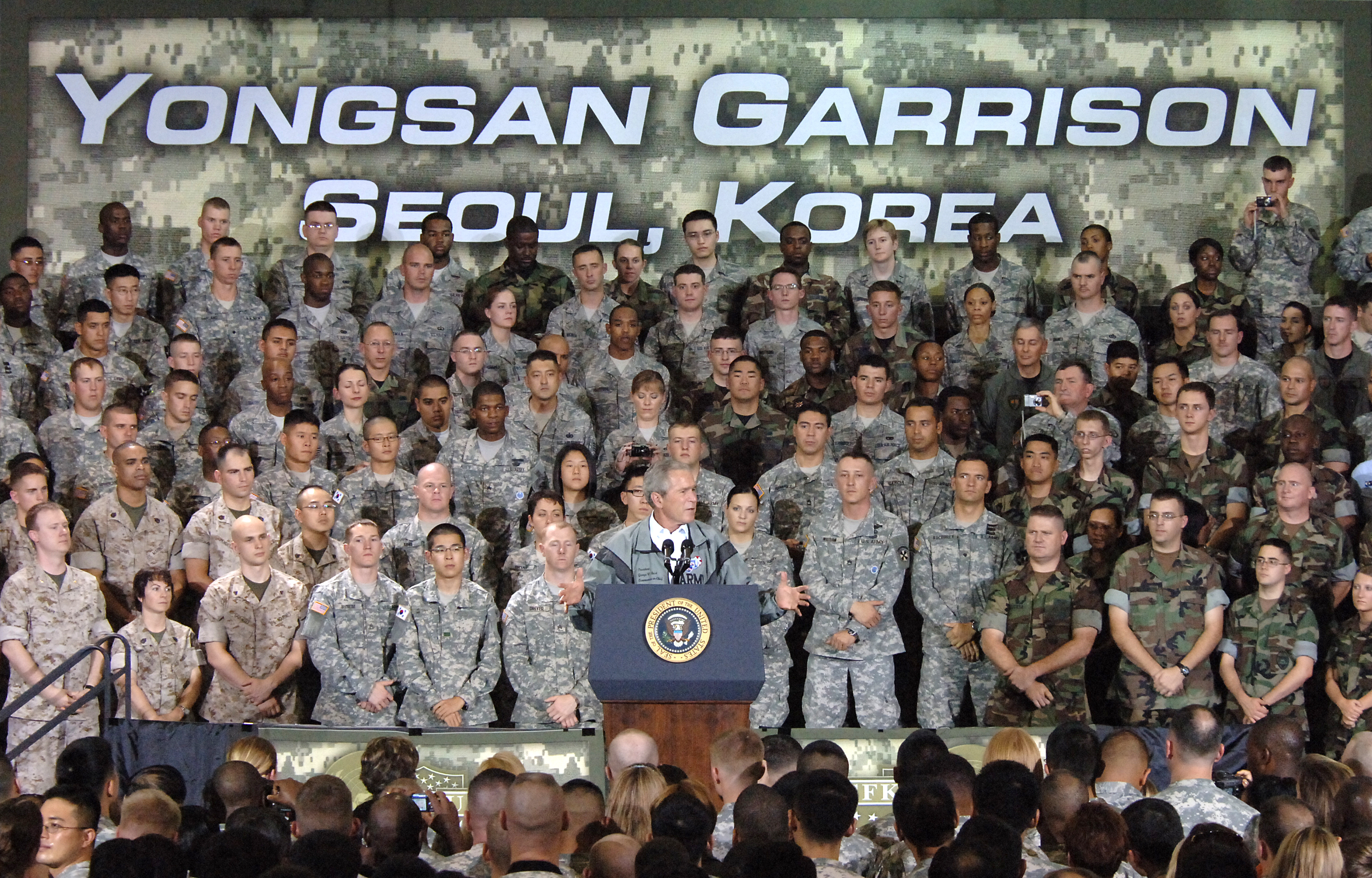
US President George W. Bush speaking at the Yongsan Garrison in 2008

Some note that the dish evokes images of American imperialism, particularly related to controversies surrounding U.S. military bases in South Korea. Some Korean Americans, particularly those who were adopted after the Korean War or are mixed-race children of war brides, have noted parallels between the dish's mix of cultures and their own. The inclusion of Spam is a point of contention, as the food has been described as "the furthest thing from refined" and made the subject of jokes in popular culture. This contrasts with the perception of the food in South Korea during the 1990s, where it was seen as somewhat of a luxury. Some of these emotions have been explored through art. A 2005 multimedium art piece entitled BooDaeChiGae displayed a video inside of a C-ration can. The video showed the dish being made, while the audio was of a Korean War survivor talking about living off garbage from military bases.

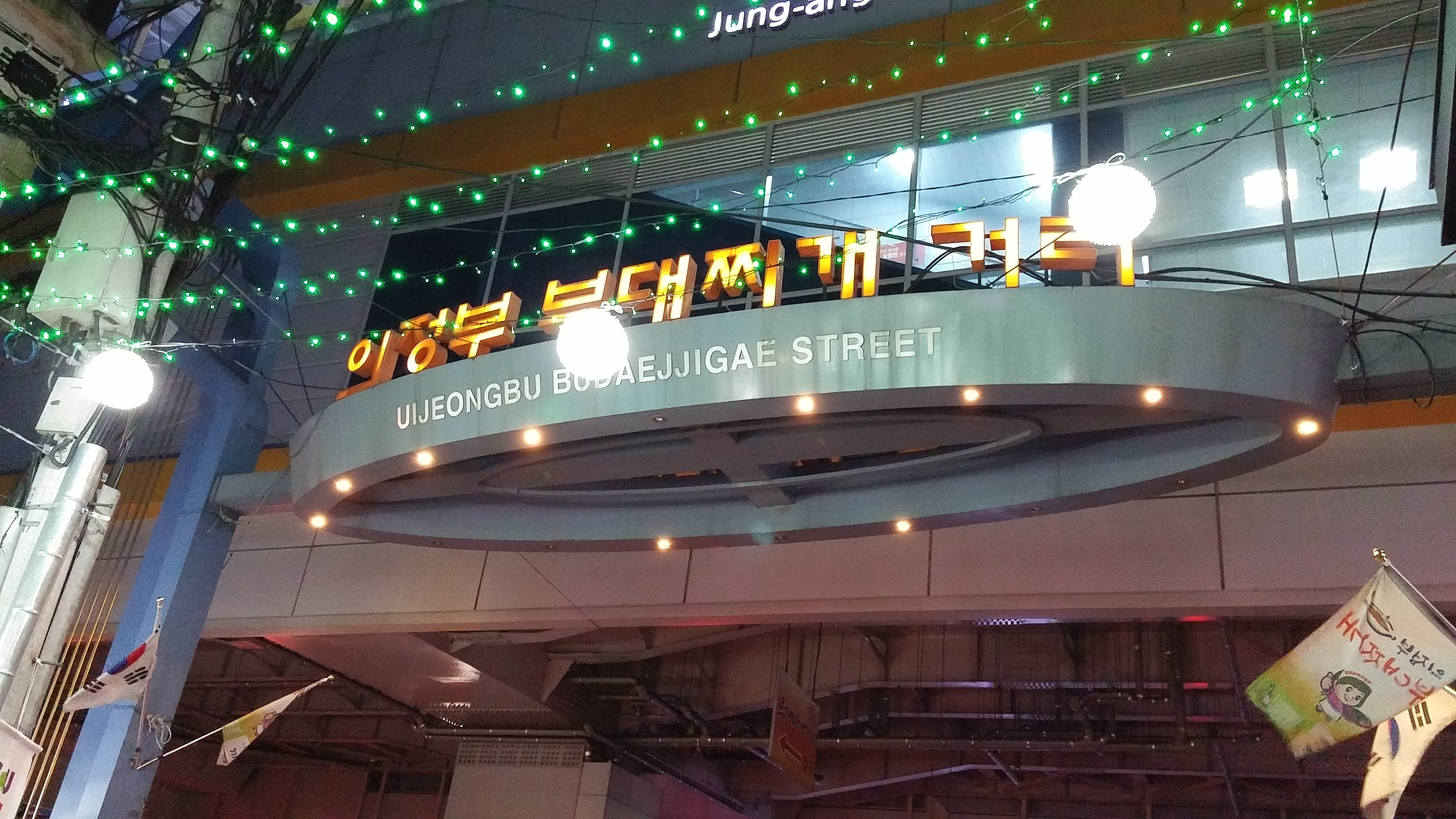
Uijeongbu Budae-jjigae Street (2016)

These mixed emotions have led to some attempts to rename the dish. The city of Uijeongbu, which is north of Seoul and has many army bases, is known for its budae-jjigae. Since 1998, it has had a street with numerous budae-jjigae restaurants. In 1999, the local government attempted to change the name of the dish to Uijeongbu-jjigae ("Uijeongbu Stew"), and the street accordingly. The new name failed to gain traction, and the name of the street was eventually changed back.

Since 2006, Uijeongbu has held a Budae-jjigae Festival on Uijeongbu Budae-jjigae Street, organized in recent years by the Uijeongbu Urban Corporation to promote the city’s budae-jjigae and revitalize the local commercial district. Programs include free tastings at participating restaurants, a cooking contest, experience programs, and performances.

The dish has been used as a neutral or positive metaphor for cosmopolitanism. In a 2020 book, researcher of Korean cinema Christina Klein used the term "budae-jjigae cinema" to describe South Korean films after the Korean War. She compared the invention of the dish to how filmmakers picked and chose various ideas "without asking within profoundly unequal relations of power, and [incorporated] that material into new cultural production". Jeong Dong-hyeon, writing for The Chosun Ilbo, likened the food to the music group BTS, which borrows elements of Western culture but is widely accepted as Korean. In 2017, the mayor of Uijeongbu used the dish as a metaphor for U.S.–South Korea ties. Western interest in the dish has been examined. Nicolyn Woodcock criticized Bourdain's portrayal of the dish, pointing to how Bourdain called the dish a "gift of the G.I.", how he allegedly played into perceptions of Asian exoticism, and how he did not explore the social connotations surrounding it.

Whether budae-jjigae can be considered Korean cuisine has been called into question. According to one 2022 survey, Korean adults tend to view the food as Korean but less so than dishes like kimchi-jjigae. The chef Park Chan-il contended that Korean cuisine had previously accepted new adaptations, and that what mattered was the enjoyment of the dish. She pointed out that kimchi, which Koreans consider quintessentially Korean, only became spicy after the Portuguese brought peppers to Asia in the 16th century.

Others embrace the identity of the dish, while acknowledging its past. Some see it as a hallmark of South Korea's success via its globalization. In 2020, Chef Hooni Kim, whose restaurant served the dish and was the first Korean restaurant to obtain a Michelin star, observed that younger Koreans tend to have more positive reactions to the dish. He said:

I don't think Korea's younger generation considers the country having been poor as something to be ashamed of. Budae-jjigae is an honest portrayal of where our country was and how far our country has come.

== See also ==
- Pagpag: a dish born from poverty in the Philippines
- Mulligan stew: an American poverty dish
- Han (cultural): Korean expression of sorrow related to the events of the 20th century
