= Doenjang-guk =

Korean soybean soup

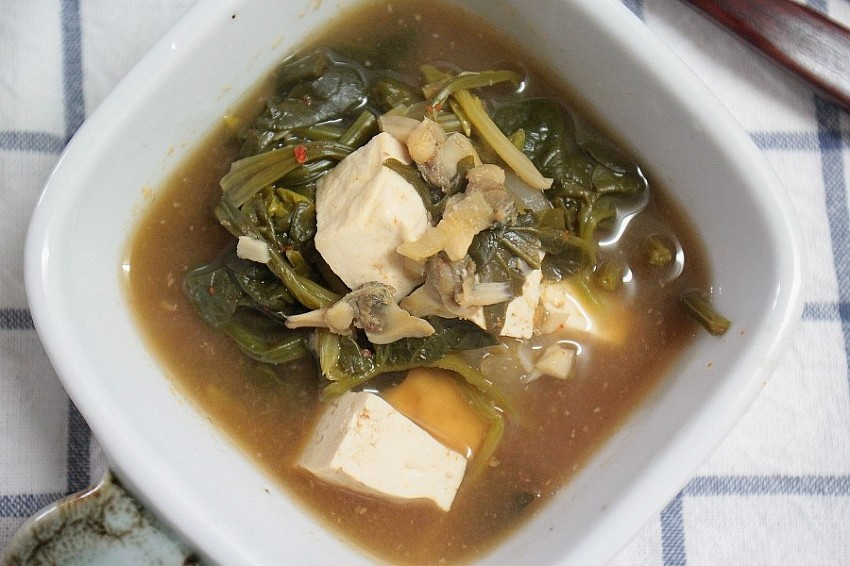
- Sigeumchi-doenjang-guk (soybean paste soup with spinach)
- Alternative names: Soybean paste soup
- Type: Guk
- Place of origin: Korea
- Associated cuisine: Korean cuisine
- Main ingredients: Doenjang
- Similar dishes: Miso soup

Korean name
- Hangul: 된장국
- Hanja: 된醬국
- RR: doenjangguk
- MR: toenjangkuk
- IPA: twen.dʑaŋ.k͈uk̚

Doenjang-guk (Korean: 된장국; pronounced [twen.dʑaŋ.k͈uk̚]) or soybean paste soup is a guk (soup) made with doenjang (soybean paste) and other ingredients, such as vegetables, meat, and seafood. It is thinner, lighter, and milder than doenjang-jjigae (soybean paste stew). It is similar to the Japanese miso soup. It is sometimes mild, sometimes strong, and accompanied with rice most of the time.

Doenjang-guk is an example of a banchan, one of several small dishes served with meals at restaurants and in home cooking. Other banchan include kimchi, marinated vegetables, and pickled/salted seafood. This soup is perhaps the cheapest meal in Korea.

== History ==
In the Joseon period, the royals had five meals (called sura), and in three of those they had doenjang-guk as a side dish (banchan; 반찬), specifically on a small table on the right side of the main table, together with other Korean traditional foods such as vegetables (chaeso; 채소), meat (kogi; 고기), egg, and sesame oil (chamgireum; 참기름).

== Ingredients ==
The most simple form of this soup is clear soybean paste soup (malgeun-doenjangguk 맑은 된장국). It is mainly composed of a good fermented soybean paste and stock. It accompanies more complex one-bowl rice dishes that have many ingredients, like bibimbap with sliced raw fish and avocado, mushroom, and other vegetables. The ingredients for this soup are anchovy-kelp stock, vegetable stock, or unsalted chicken broth; doenjang paste; and optionally some scallions.

The most commonly eaten form of this dish is soybean paste soup with cabbage (baechu-doenjangguk; 배추된장국) and it is eaten at any time of the day. The broth has a deep, comforting flavor, the cabbage adds texture and sweetness, and it is light since there is no grease. The ingredients are dried anchovies; napa cabbage leaves, white-stemmed chard, or bok choy; doenjang; garlic; chili peppers; all-purpose flour or rice water; and fish sauce.

To make the broth for a doenjang-based soup or stew, it is common to begin with the water used to wash rice, ssaltteumul (쌀뜨물). This rice water adds starch to the soup and works as a binding agent between the soybean paste and the broth, while improving the flavor of the doenjang. A substitute can be made by mixing in a teaspoon of flour or rice flour.

=== Types ===
- Mu-doenjang-guk (무된장국) is light yet very flavorful. Prepared with Korean radish, and also some basic aromatic vegetables, such as onion, garlic, scallion, chili peppers, dried kelp, ssaltteeumul (쌀뜨물), and dried shiitake mushrooms (which are common ingredients used to make a traditional Korean broth).
- Paraetguk or parae-doenjangguk (파랫국; 파래된장국) is grassy seaweed soup with soybean paste, a regional specialty of Jeju Province.
- Cheonggyeongchae dubu-doenjangguk (청경채 두부된장국) is made with tofu, bok choy, and gochujang in addition to the regular ingredients used to make the broth.
- Naengi guk (냉이국) (shepherd's purse soup) is very similar to mugwort soup (ssuk-guk; 쑥국) made with nangyi (냉이), gukkanjang (국간장), wild sesame powder and the rest of the common ingredients for the doenjang-guk base broth. Many vegetables can be added to accompany the main ingredients.

== Gallery ==
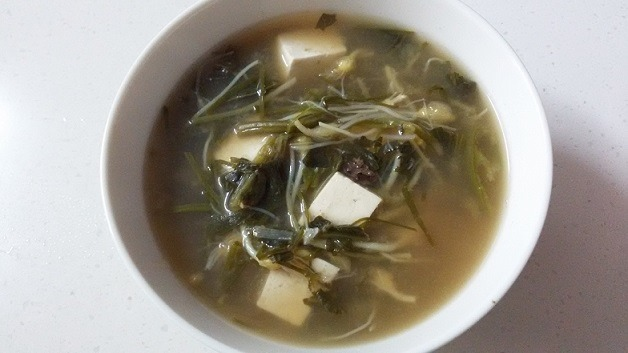
Dallae-doenjang-guk (soybean paste soup with Korean wild chives)

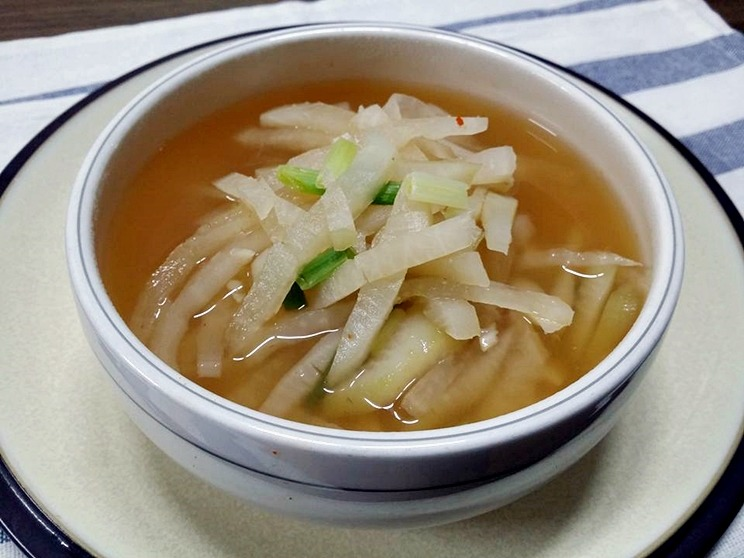
Dongchimi-doenjang-guk (soybean paste soup with dongchimi)

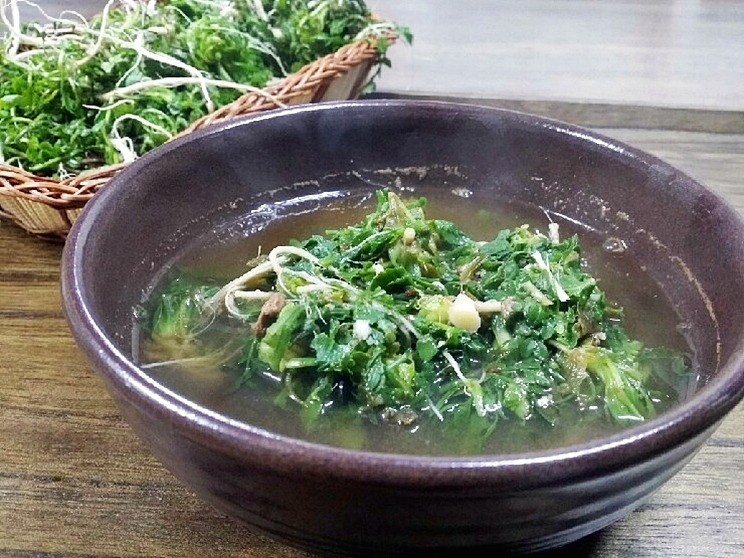
Naengi-doenjang-guk (soybean paste soup with shepherd's purse)

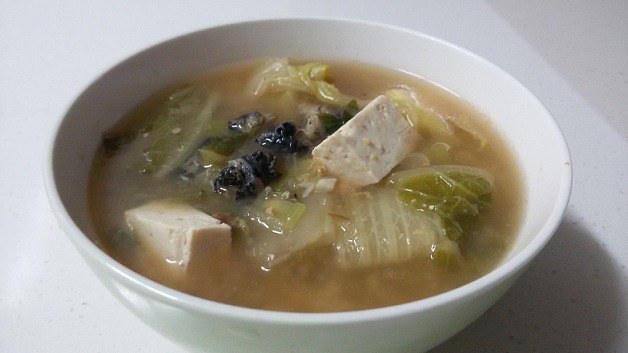
Ugeoji-ureong-doenjang-guk (soybean paste soup with ugeoji and river snails)
