= Ugeoji =

Korean leaf ingredient

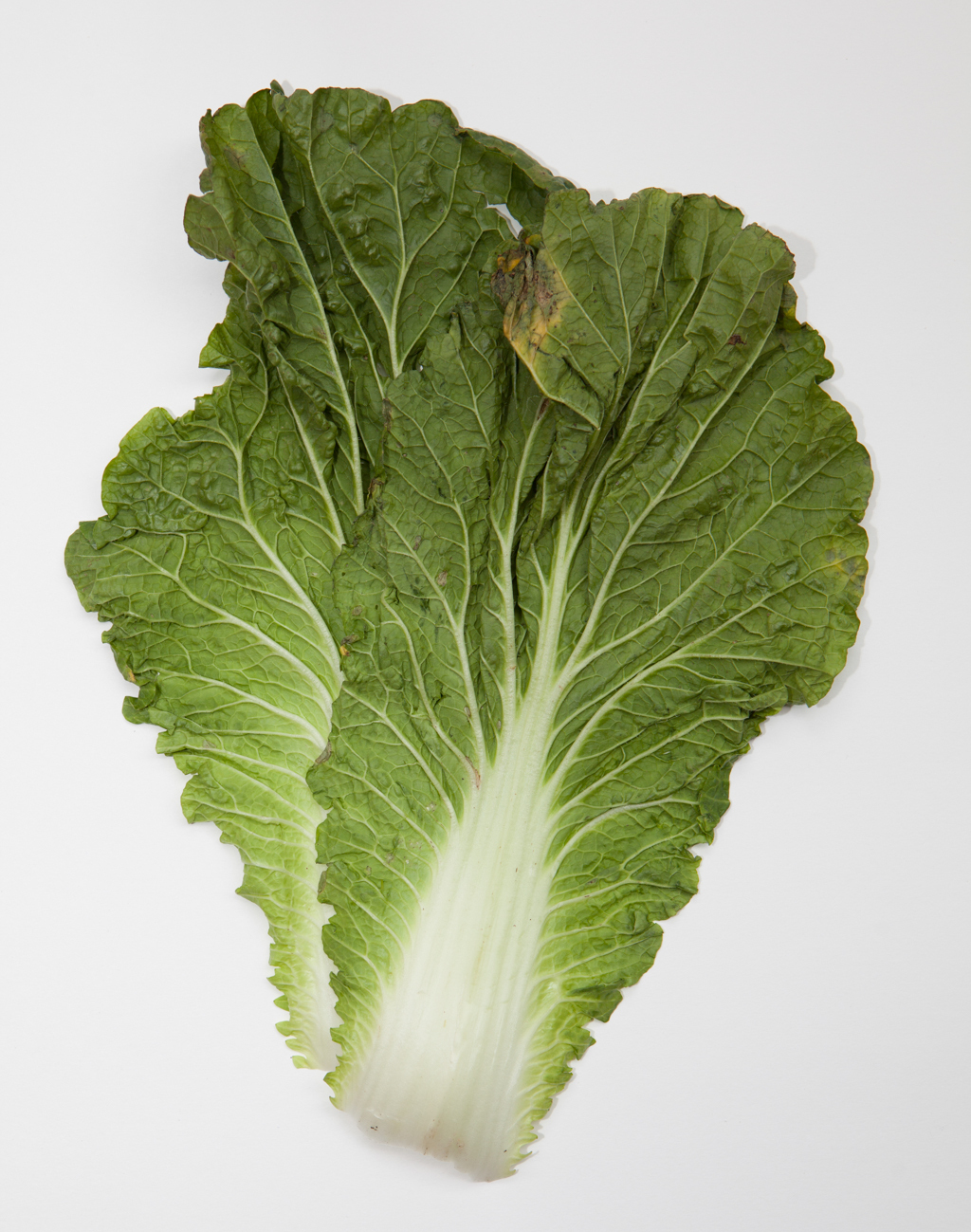
- Place of origin: Korea
- Associated cuisine: Korean cuisine

Korean name
- Hangul: 우거지
- RR: ugeoji
- MR: ugŏji
- IPA: [u.ɡʌ.dʑi]

In Korean cuisine, ugeoji (Korean: 우거지) is outer leaves or stems of cabbage, radish, and other greens, which are removed while trimming the vegetables.

Ugeoji is often used in soups and stews, including haejang-guk (hangover soup).

== Gallery ==
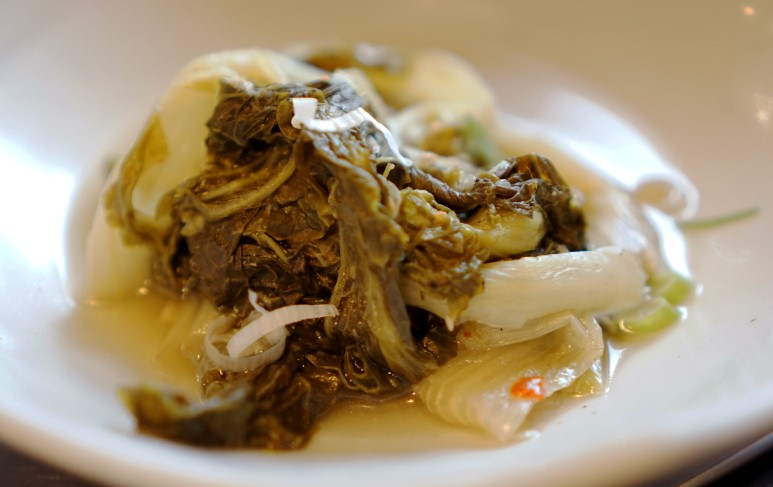
Seasoned boiled ugeoji

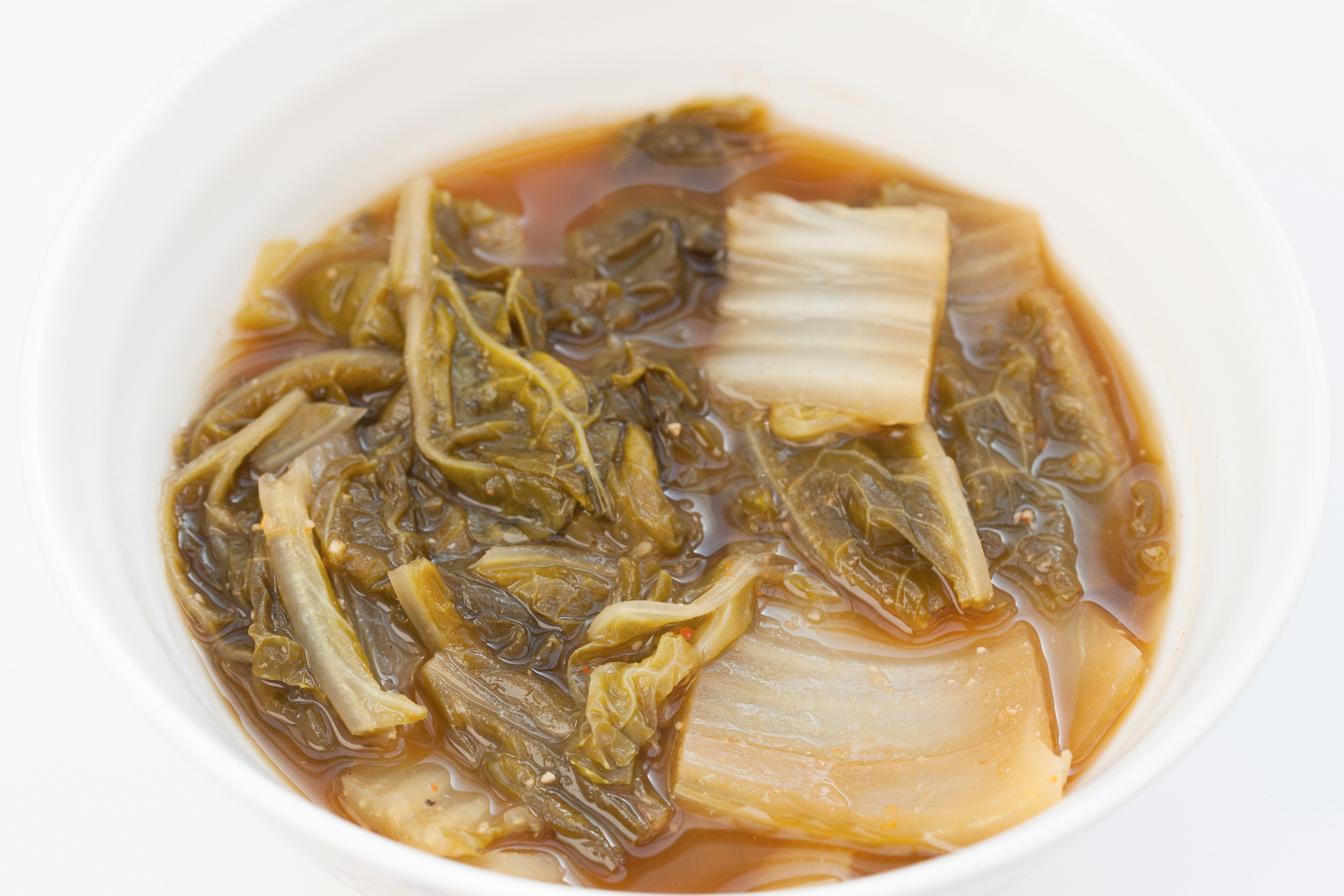
Ugeoji-guk (ugeoji soup)

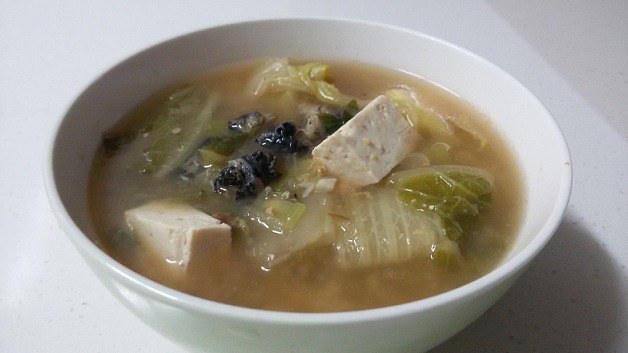
Ugeoji-ureong-doenjang-guk (soybean paste soup with ugeoji and river snails)

== See also ==
- Siraegi – dried radish greens
