= Hee Sook Lee =

Korean American restaurateur (1959–2020)

- Hee Sook Lee, from a 2020 obituary.
- Born: Hee Sook Hong; June 24, 1959; Seoul, South Korea
- Died: July 18, 2020 (aged 61); Los Angeles, California
- Other name: Hee-sook Lee
- Occupation: Businesswoman

Hee Sook Lee (Korean: 이희숙; June 24, 1959 – July 18, 2020), born Hee Sook Hong, was a South Korean-born American businesswoman and founder of the BCD Tofu House chain of restaurants.

== Early life ==
Hee Sook Hong was born in Seoul, South Korea. She was the daughter of Young Pyo Hong and Chun Ja Park. Her father was a teacher. After he became disabled, Hee Sook and her mother worked in restaurants to support the household. She studied graphic design and graduated from Santa Monica College in 1994.

== Career ==
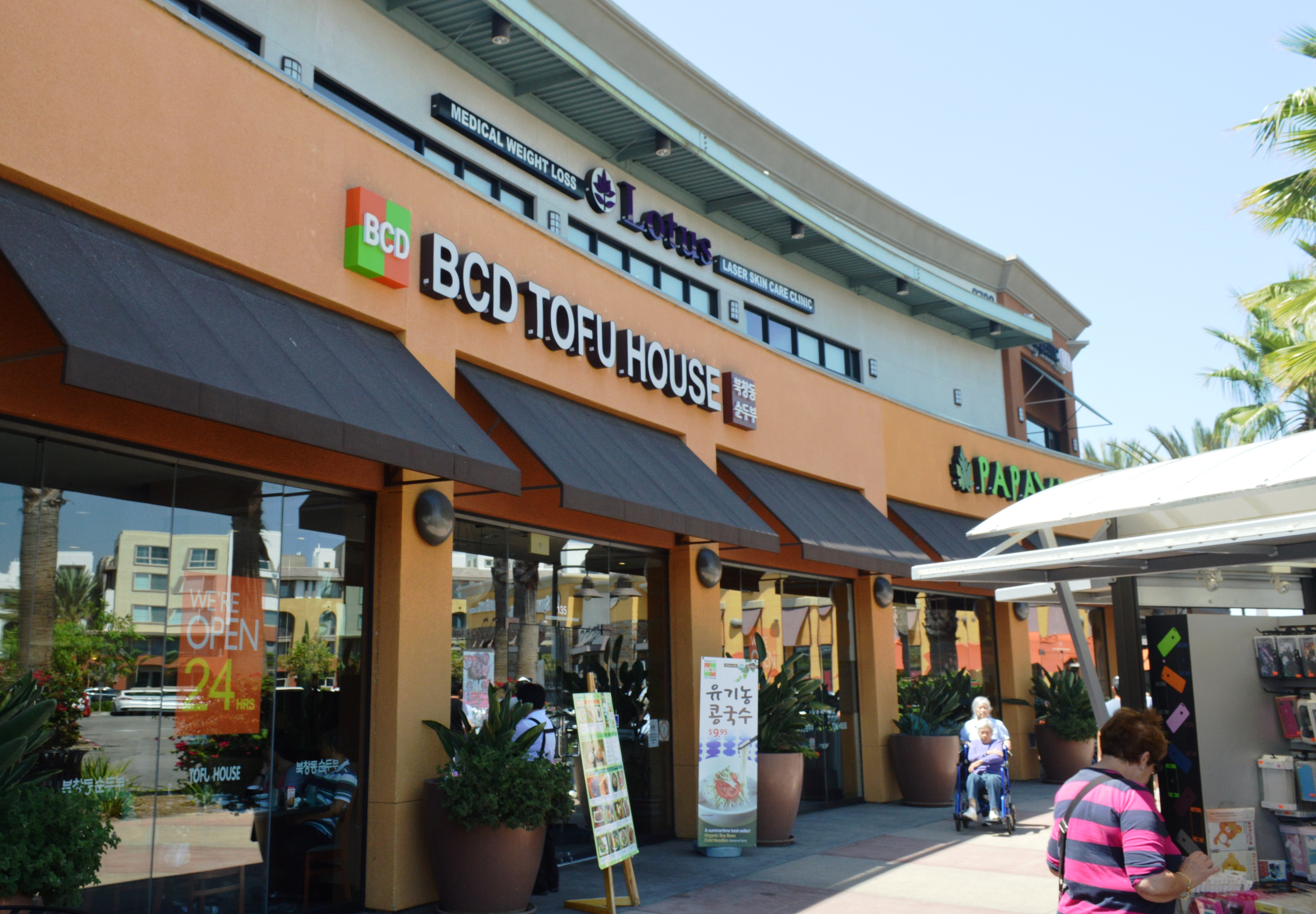
A BCD Tofu House location in Irvine, California.

Lee moved to the United States in 1989, with her husband and children. She was founder of the popular BCD Tofu House chain of Korean restaurants, named for the Buk Chang Dong neighborhood of Seoul, where her husband's mother had a restaurant. Her first restaurant opened in the Koreatown neighborhood of Los Angeles in April 1996. The house specialty, soondubu-jjigae, was made from her own secret recipe. Her chain expanded to include more than a dozen locations, including restaurants in Dallas and New York's Koreatown. Kits for making her signature soup are sold in Korean-American supermarkets.

In early 2020, when Parasite won the Golden Globe for Best Foreign Language Film, director Bong Joon-ho and other members of the film's cast and crew went to BCD Tofu House on Wilshire Boulevard, after the awards ceremony. The restaurant stayed open 24 hours for take-out orders, and donated soup to needy elderly people and essential workers, during the COVID-19 pandemic.

Lee served as president of Global Children Foundation, a Christian charity founded by Korean-American women.

== Personal life ==
Hee Sook Hong married lawyer and restaurant owner Tae Ro Lee in 1983. The couple had three sons. Lee died in Los Angeles in July 2020, aged 61 years, from ovarian cancer. Her son Eddie Lee became interim executive of the family's restaurant business.
