= Sundubu-jjigae =

Korean traditional soft tofu stew

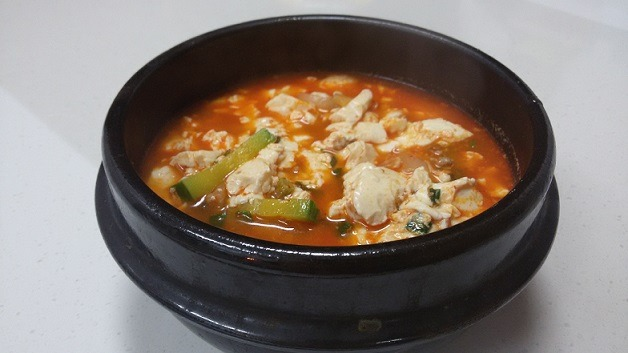
- Alternative names: Soft tofu stew
- Type: Jjigae
- Place of origin: Korea
- Associated cuisine: Korean cuisine
- Main ingredients: Sundubu (extra soft tofu)

Korean name
- Hangul: 순두부찌개
- Hanja: 순豆腐찌개
- RR: sundubujjigae
- MR: sundubutchigae
- IPA: [sʰun.du.bu.t͈ɕi.ɡɛ̝]

Sundubu-jjigae (Korean: 순두부찌개) is a jjigae in Korean cuisine. The dish is made with freshly curdled extra soft tofu (sundubu) which has not been strained and pressed, vegetables, sometimes mushrooms, onion, optional seafood (commonly oysters, mussels, clams and shrimp), optional meat (commonly beef or pork), and gochujang or gochugaru. The dish is assembled and cooked directly in the serving vessel, which is traditionally made of thick, robust porcelain, but can also be ground out of solid stone. A raw egg can be put in the jjigae just before serving, and the dish is delivered while bubbling vigorously. It is typically eaten with a bowl of cooked white rice and several banchan.

Extra soft tofu, called sundubu (순두부; lit. 'mild tofu') in Korean, is softer than other types of tofu and is usually sold in tubes. The first iteration of sundubu was discovered by a Joseon civil official who used spring water and sea water during its cooking process. The stew has multiple variations from various counties in South Korea.

The dish has reached popularity overseas, making appearances in American and Canadian media such as Kim's Convenience of CBC Television. Restaurants that specialise in sundubu-jjigae can be found in many cities, usually Koreatowns, in the United States and Canada.

== Naming ==
The name of the dish is a combination of sundubu and jjigae. The term sundubu (순두부; 순豆腐) means extra soft tofu, with dubu (두부) meaning tofu. The word -jjigae (찌개) describes a thicker stew with more ingredients than -guk (국 'soup'). Sun- (순-) does not have an associated Chinese character.

== Description ==
Sundubu-jjigae can be prepared in both meat and vegan options. To prepare the dish, the soup base can be either any forms of broth or plain water. The most common broth includes anchovy, beef, and chicken. Common ingredients contain soy sauce, kimchi, minced garlic, gochugaru, toasted sesame oil, vegetable oil, onions, and salt. Based on the type of broth and ingredients, additional items can be added. Some recipes include vegetables such as radish, zucchini, shiitake mushrooms, kelp, and scallions. Pork, beef, and shrimp can also be incorporated.

=== Preparation ===
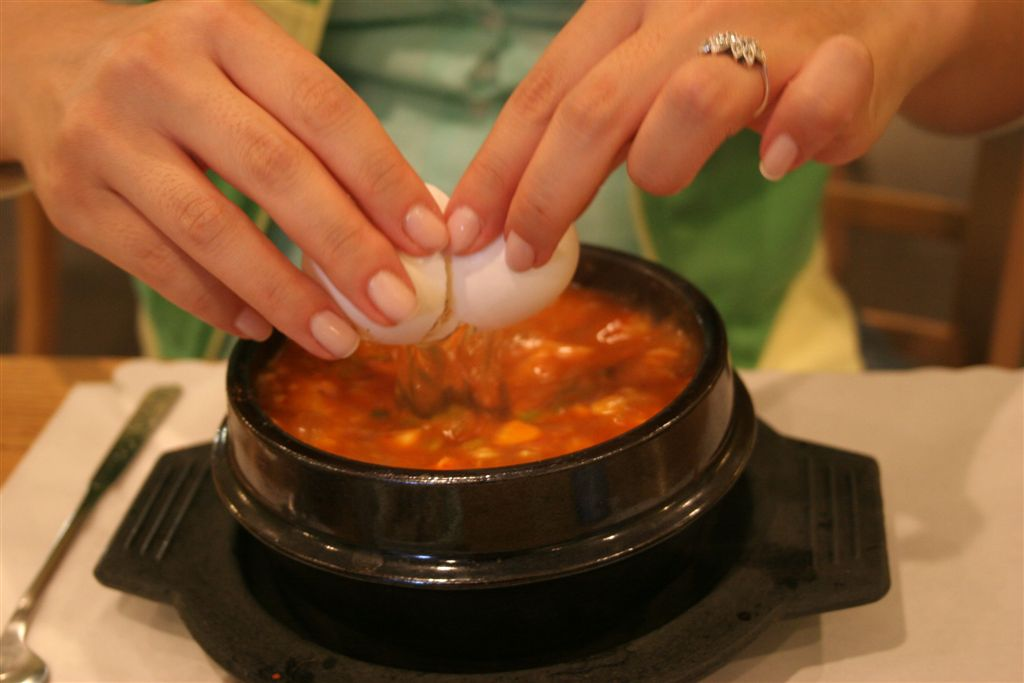
A raw egg is added directly into the bowl.

Just like any jjigae, the dish is prepared in a heatable pot. During the cooking process, spicy paste is incorporated into the mixture, usually made from hot pepper flakes and sesame oil. In the heated pot, vegetable oil, onion, garlic, and pork are sautéed for a few minutes. Kimchi can be added, and a portion of the broth or stock is poured in, before covering and allowing it to cook. Later, salt, sugar, and the soft tofu are mixed in. A raw egg is dropped in the center before serving. A garnish of green onions complements this dish, which is traditionally eaten with rice and various banchan.

== History ==
The origins of using unpressed tofu in Korean cuisine is not well documented, but records from the Joseon dynasty archives show an early form of sundubu-jjigae being served. Some historians assume that unpressed tofu use spread to the masses during the Joseon dynasty.

The key ingredient sundubu originated in the village of Chodang when Chodang Heoyeop, a Joseon-era civil official, made tofu from the spring water and used sea water instead of brine. The spring water was discovered in the front yard of his office.

== Popularity ==
Sundubu-jjigae is considered a regional food in Wanju County and Hamyang County. Hamyang County's regional sundubu-jjigae is prepared with galbi and clams.

=== Overseas ===
Following the Korean War, some American military servicemen who returned from Korea brought home jjigae (especially dubu jjigae) recipes. Some Korean Americans and Korean Canadians opened Korean restaurants in their neighbourhoods.

In 1986, Monica Lee opened Beverly Soon Tofu in the Koreatown neighbourhood of Los Angeles, California, and it was the first restaurant in the United States to specialise in sundubu-jjigae. By the 1990s, sundubu-jjigae restaurants were more popular throughout the United States and Canada.

The dish became even more widely known when Hee Sook Lee, a first-generation Korean immigrant, opened her sundubu restaurant, BCD Tofu, on Vermont Avenue in Koreatown, and expanded it into a national chain. The chain was named after the "Bukchang Dong" district in Korea where Lee's mother-in-law owned a restaurant.

In Canada, several BCD and other similar restaurants have been opened in Toronto, Ontario, since 2001, and can also be found in other cities across the country. Now, sundubu-jjigae restaurants are operated in Koreatown in Toronto and Burnaby and Coquitlam in Metro Vancouver, British Columbia. CBC TV's Kim's Convenience features a scene about sundubu-jjigae.

The North American version of the dish was eventually introduced back to South Korea due to its popularity. A New York Times article reviewing Korean restaurants including Bukchang Dong, Cho Dang Ol, and Li Hua, and Seoul Garden in New York City, described sundubu-jjigae as "a hearty brew of spicy broth and silken tofu that is served in cast-iron bowls. Topped with scallions and nuggets of tender oxtail or crisp kimchi, it's the ideal winter meal". The dish also made an appearance in the Los Angeles Times, describing the jjigae as "comforting, always satisfying".

== See also ==
- List of soups
- List of tofu dishes
