= Doenjang-jjigae =

Korean dish of soybean paste stew

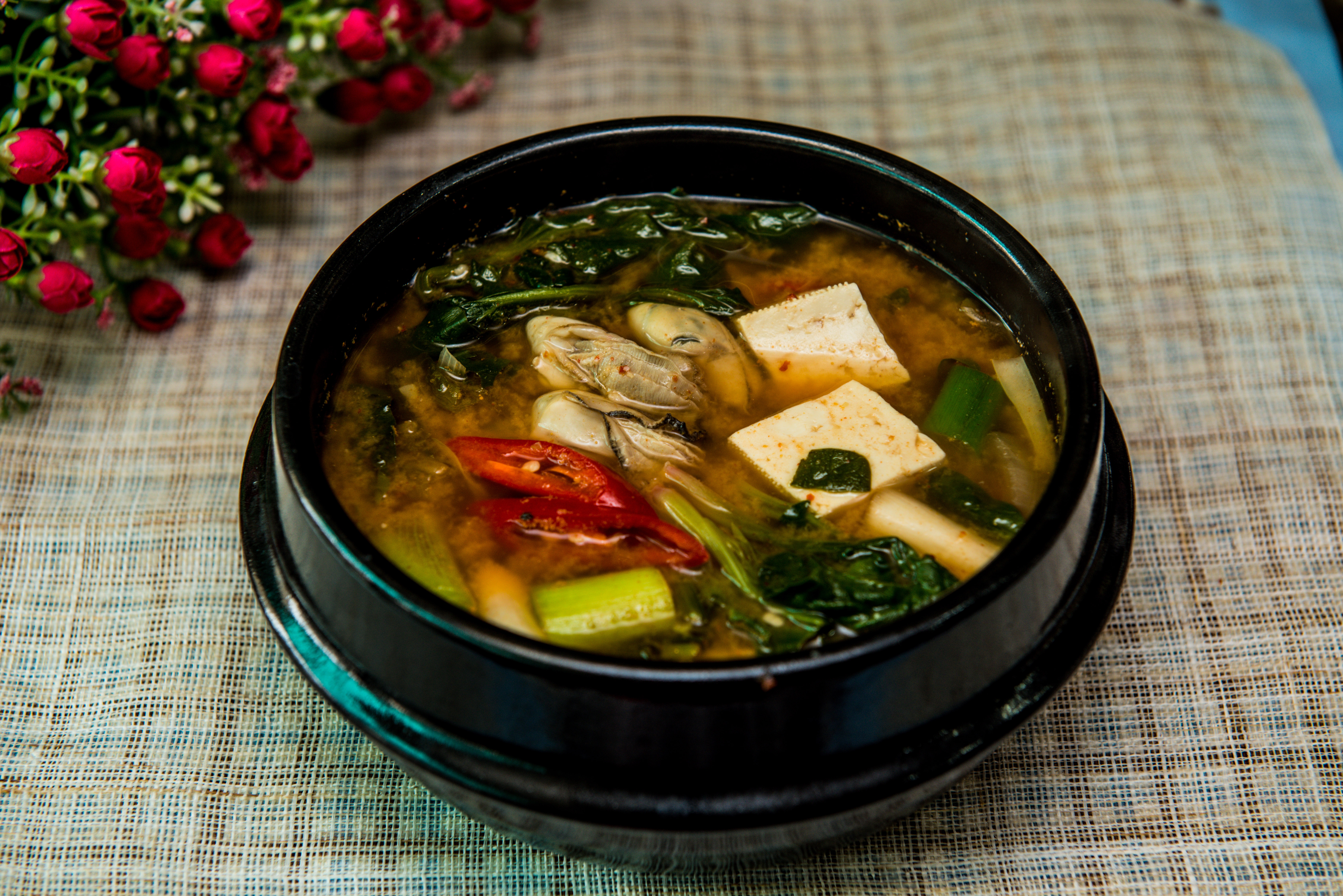
- Alternative names: Soybean paste stew
- Type: Jjigae
- Place of origin: Korea
- Associated cuisine: Korean cuisine
- Main ingredients: Doenjang
- Food energy (per 1 serving): 160 kcal (670 kJ)

Korean name
- Hangul: 된장찌개
- Hanja: 된醬찌개
- RR: doenjangjjigae
- MR: toenjangtchigae
- IPA: twen.dʑaŋ.t͈ɕi.ɡɛ

Doenjang-jjigae (Korean: 된장찌개; pronounced [twen.dʑaŋ.t͈ɕi.ɡɛ]), referred to in English as soybean paste stew, is a Korean traditional jjigae (stew-type dish), made from the primary ingredient of doenjang (soybean paste), and additional optional ingredients of vegetables, seafood, and meat. It is one of the most iconic and popular traditional dishes in Korean cuisine, and is often eaten regularly regardless of occasion or time of day. Doenjang-jjigae was initially made with home-made doenjang; however, due to extensive industrialisation of soybean paste, households and restaurants nowadays use factory-made doenjang instead as their ingredient. From traditional to modern Korean cuisine, doenjang has become one of the most frequently used jang (sauce/paste). It is claimed as a national dish.

Doenjang-jjigae is often mistaken for doenjang-guk (soybean paste soup). The main difference between Korean-style stew and soup is in the method of cooking and serving. Jjigae is thicker, has more ingredients, and is largely served as a dish. Guk is served more so as a companion to the rice to be eaten together.

== History ==
The origin of doenjang, which is used as the primary ingredient of doenjang-jjigae, dates back to as early as the Korean Three Kingdoms period. Korea was largely agricultural, with vast farmlands but unstable, insufficient sources of meat, especially during winter. In the search for easily prepared relief substitutes of sources of protein, Korean farmers began cultivating jang (sauce/paste) from various plants and seeds. Doenjang was first produced during this period through the fermentation of soybeans in the form of meju. Fermented soybean paste is a rich source of isoflavone, which helps in preventing cardiovascular diseases and supplies daily nutrients to the body.

The first official record of the use of doenjang is written in the Samguk sagi, the historical records of the Three Kingdoms era registered by government officials and scholars. It is recorded that doenjang and other varieties of jang were served at the wedding ceremony of King Sinmun of Silla in 683 CE.

The earliest form of doenjang jjigae is mainly connected to 'curled mallow soup', which is mentioned in the Jeungbo sallim gyeongje, a record of Korean agriculture by physician Yu Jung-Rim during the rule of King Youngjo (1724 – 1776). Curled mallow soup is a traditional Korean soup-type dish where mallow leaves and other vegetables are boiled in a doenjang-filled broth, and served as a soup complementary with rice. Since this period, various provinces and regions around the Korean peninsula began to develop their own unique recipes of doenjang-jjigae, and most varieties of these soybean paste stew are still maintained.

== Ingredients ==
There are many variations and subtle differences in the ingredients used in cooking doenjang-jjigae in accordance to its originating province. Primary and typical ingredients commonly found in doenjang-jjigae include doenjang (fermented soybean paste), dried anchovies, white radish, Korean chili pepper, minced garlic, water, onions, green onions, potato, zucchini, and medium-firm tofu.

Doenjang-jjigae was traditionally cooked with homemade soybean paste, which was commonly prepared in most households, similar to the preparation of kimchi. Industrialization brought a nationwide shift to using factory-made doenjang.

Many other ingredients can be added to doenjang-jjigae for a heartier meal, especially meat or seafood. These secondary ingredients significantly change the taste of the broth and stew, so it is usually referred to by a slightly different name according to the ingredient used. The most common seafood ingredients added to doenjang-jjigae include prawns or small clams, and beef is the most popular and commonly found meat ingredient.

== Preparation and serving ==
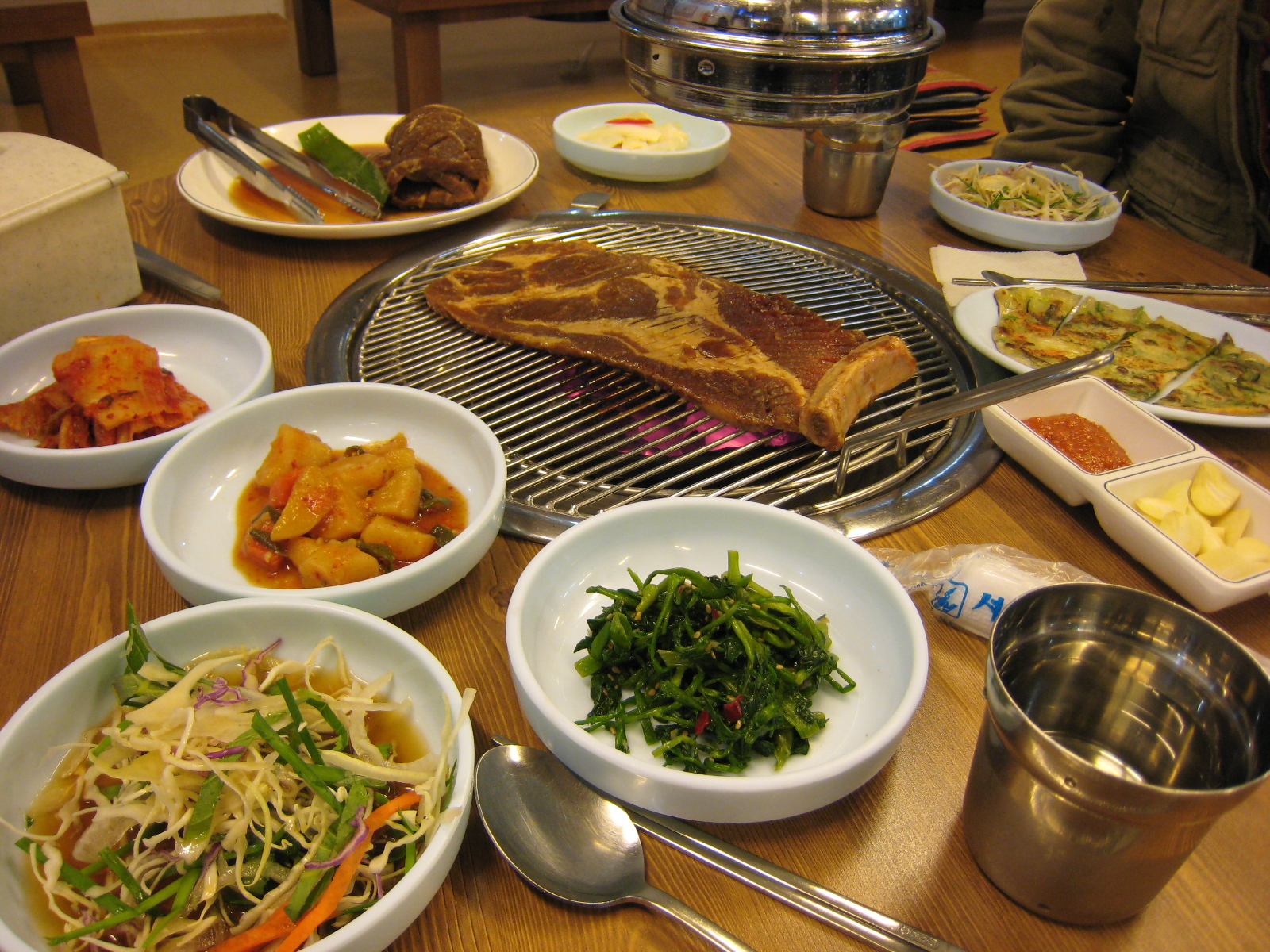
Korean barbecue with supplementary banchans

The base broth is made by boiling dried anchovies and white radishes. Doenjang and chili pepper are added, it is boiled further, and the anchovies are removed and the other ingredients added.

== Health benefits ==
Doenjang contains isoflavone, which helps prevent diseases such as cardiovascular disease or osteoporosis, and lecithin, which helps improve brain function. In addition, doenjang is rich in dietary fiber, which is beneficial for digestive system functions.

== Varieties ==
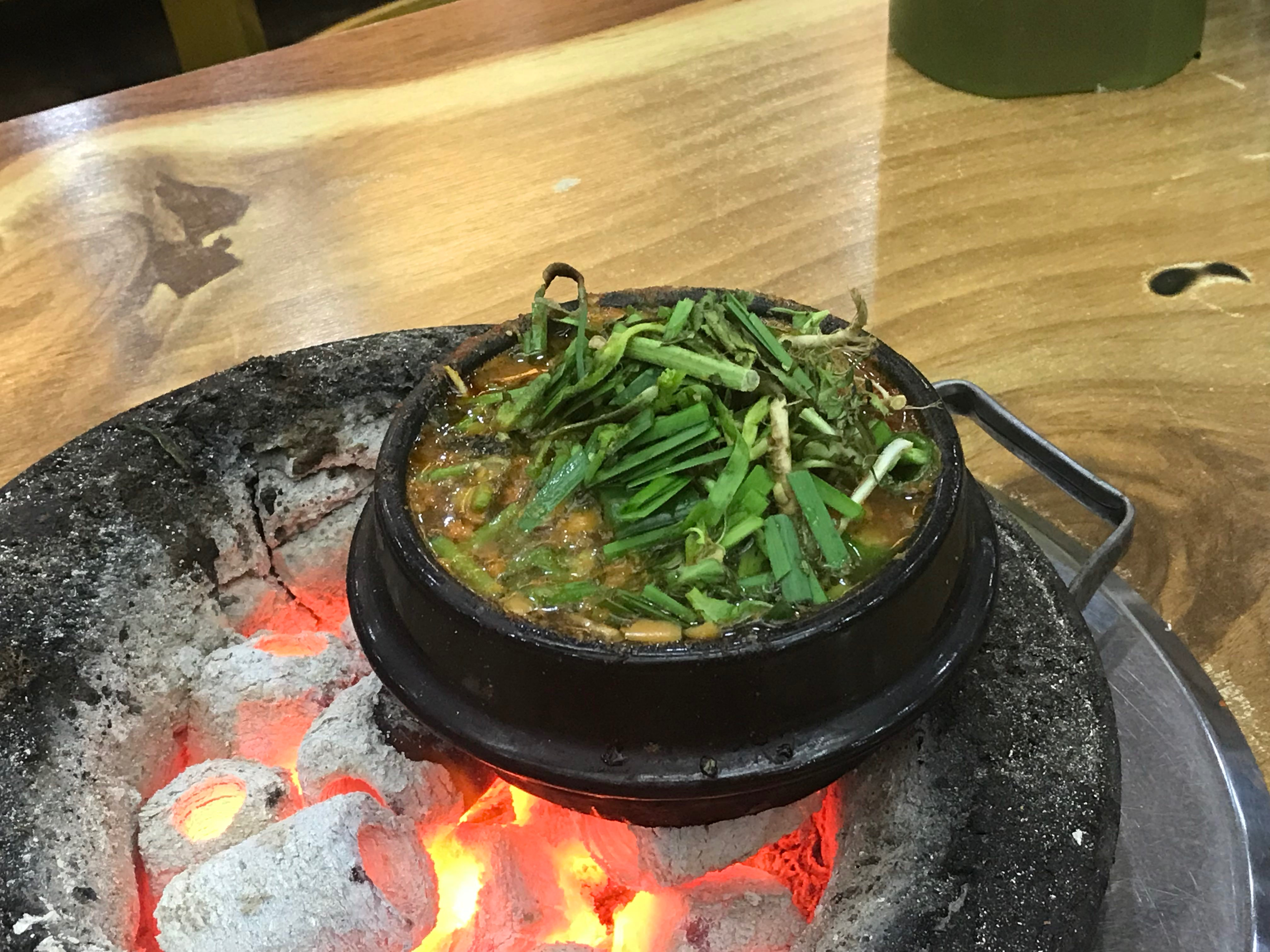
Naengi (shepherd's purse) doenjang-jjigae

Multiple varieties of doenjang-jjigae can be found in Korean cuisine, different in taste, presentation, regionality, and steps of preparation and consumption. These varieties are usually distinguished by their unique main ingredient, which the dish itself is usually named after, with doenjang-jjigae following it.

- Kkot-gae (꽃게; lit. 'swimming crab'). The carapace and legs of swimming crabs are added in the process of making the broth. The crab adds sweetness and deep taste to the stew.
- Chadolbaegi (차돌배기; lit. 'beef brisket'). Fried beef brisket in oil is added to the broth and boiled with the rest of the normal ingredients of doenjang-jjigae. Beef brisket doenjang-jjigae is usually served at Korean barbecue restaurants as a complementary dish to the meat.
- Bajirak (바지락; lit. 'Manila clam'). Clams are de-gritted and prepared, then added into a cooked doenjang-jjigae for a deeper and more savory taste.

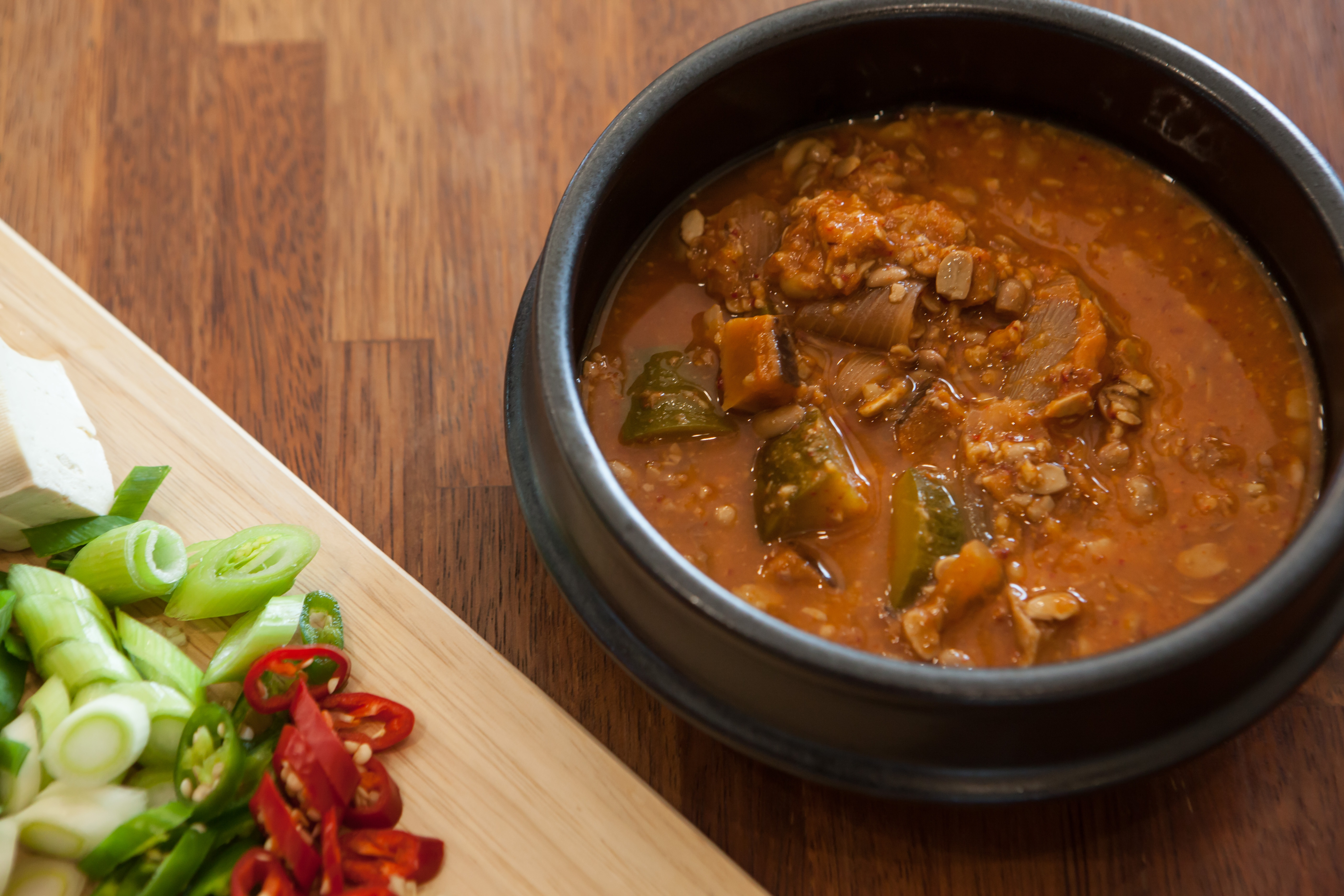
Gang-doenjang-jjigae

- Sundubu (순두부; lit. 'curdled soft tofu'). Medium tofu is usually chosen over soft tofu in cooking stews since soft tofu is very delicate and de-solidifies easily, but soft tofu can be used in cooking doenjang-jjigae for a softer stew for children.
- Dallae (달래; lit. 'Korean wild chives'). Dallae is added into the broth of doenjang-jjigae just before bringing it to a boil. The chives release a pungent and mildly herbal taste into the stew.
- Naengi (냉이; lit. 'shepherd's purse'). The leafy roots of shepherd's purse are blanched in hot water, then added to a cooked doenjang-jjigae at the end for its fragrance.
- Gang-doenjang (간 된장) Vegetable ingredients are first stir-fried with doenjang and gochujang; less water is added than in the usual doenjang-jjigae recipe, and the mixture is brought to a boil until the stew has a thick consistency.

== See also ==
- Doenjang
- Doenjang-guk
- Fermented soybean paste
- Kimchi-jjigae
- Jjigae
- Korean cuisine
