= Kimchi-jjigae =

Korean kimchi stew

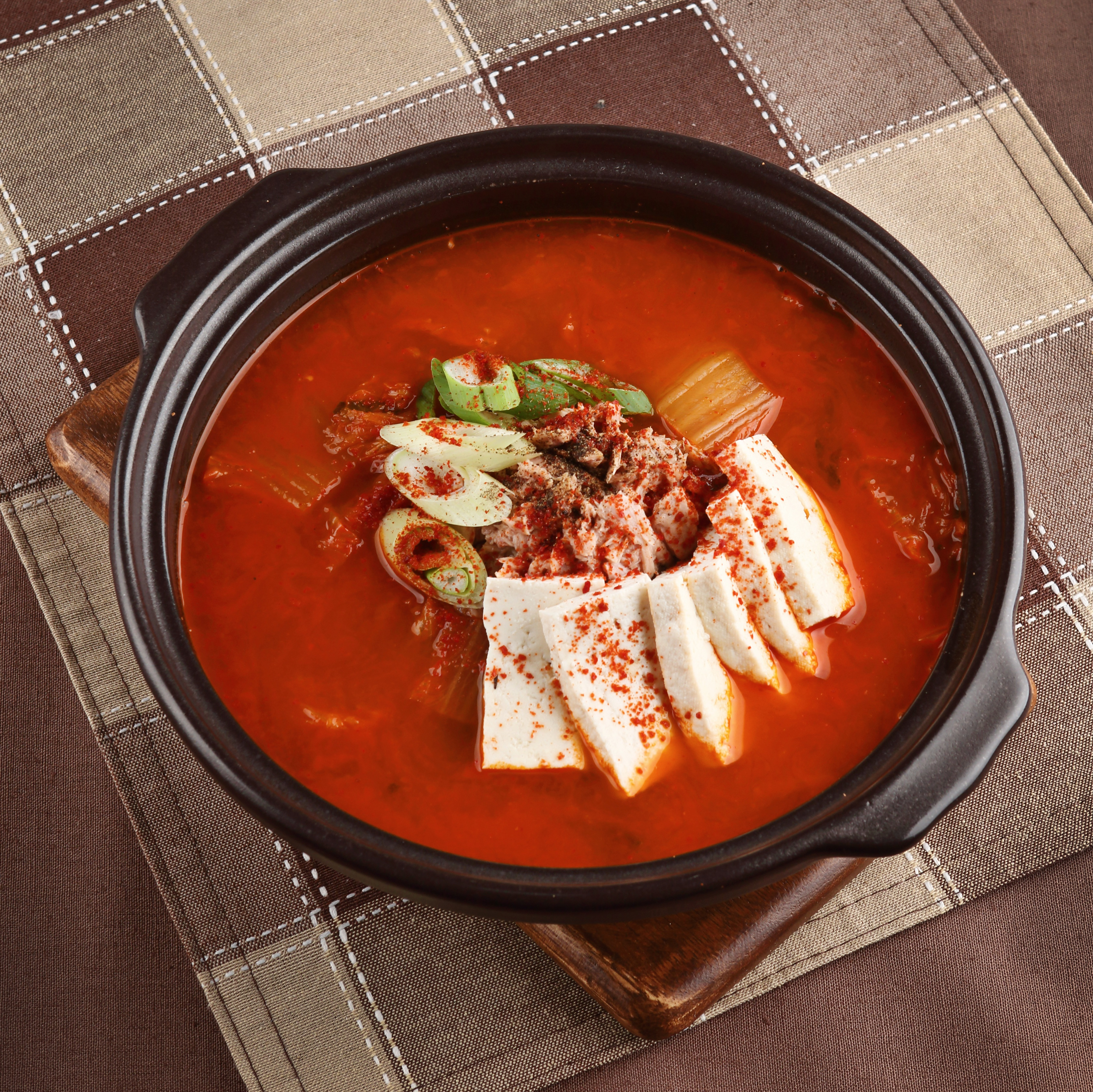
- Alternative names: Kimchi stew
- Type: Jjigae
- Place of origin: Korea
- Main ingredients: Kimchi

Korean name
- Hangul: 김치찌개
- RR: gimchijjigae
- MR: kimch'itchigae
- IPA: [kim.tɕʰi.t͈ɕi.ɡɛ]

Kimchi-jjigae (Korean: 김치찌개) or kimchi stew is a jjigae, or stew-like Korean dish, made with kimchi and other ingredients, such as pork, scallions, onions, and diced tofu. It is one of the most common stews in Korean cuisine.

== History ==
Kimchi existed as a non-spicy pickled vegetable dish well prior to the Joseon era (1392–1897); it was not until the introduction of chili peppers to the Korean peninsula mid-era that the variant of kimchi which has become the de facto standard of today was created. Kimchi-jjigae is assumed to have developed around this time as well.

Joseon-period cookbooks do not use the word jjigae; dishes of this type first appear in writing under the name jochi (조치) in the Siuijeonseo, compiled in the late Joseon period. Jochi was the court term for jjigae, and kimchi-jochi was made by stewing chopped kimchi with seasoned shredded beef and pyeonyuk (boiled, pressed sliced meat), seasoned with soy sauce.

== Preparation and serving ==
Kimchi's flavor as an ingredient becomes stronger and more complex as it ages. As a result, kimchi-jjigae is often cooked using older, more fermented, and "riper" kimchi, which has a much more pronounced flavor and contains higher amounts of probiotics. (Living bacteria in fresh, uncooked kimchi will not survive the cooking process.) As kimchi is the core ingredient in kimchi-jjigae, other ingredients are dependent on personal preference.

Sliced kimchi is put into a pot with the meat of choice and other typical ingredients, such as tofu, sliced spring onions, and garlic. They are stewed in water or anchovy (myeolchi) stock. The stew is seasoned with fermented bean paste (doenjang) or fermented red pepper paste (gochujang).

Like many other Korean dishes, kimchi-jjigae is usually eaten communally from the center of the table if more than two people are served. It is accompanied by traditional side dishes (banchan) and rice. It is usually cooked and served boiling hot in a stone pot.

== Varieties ==
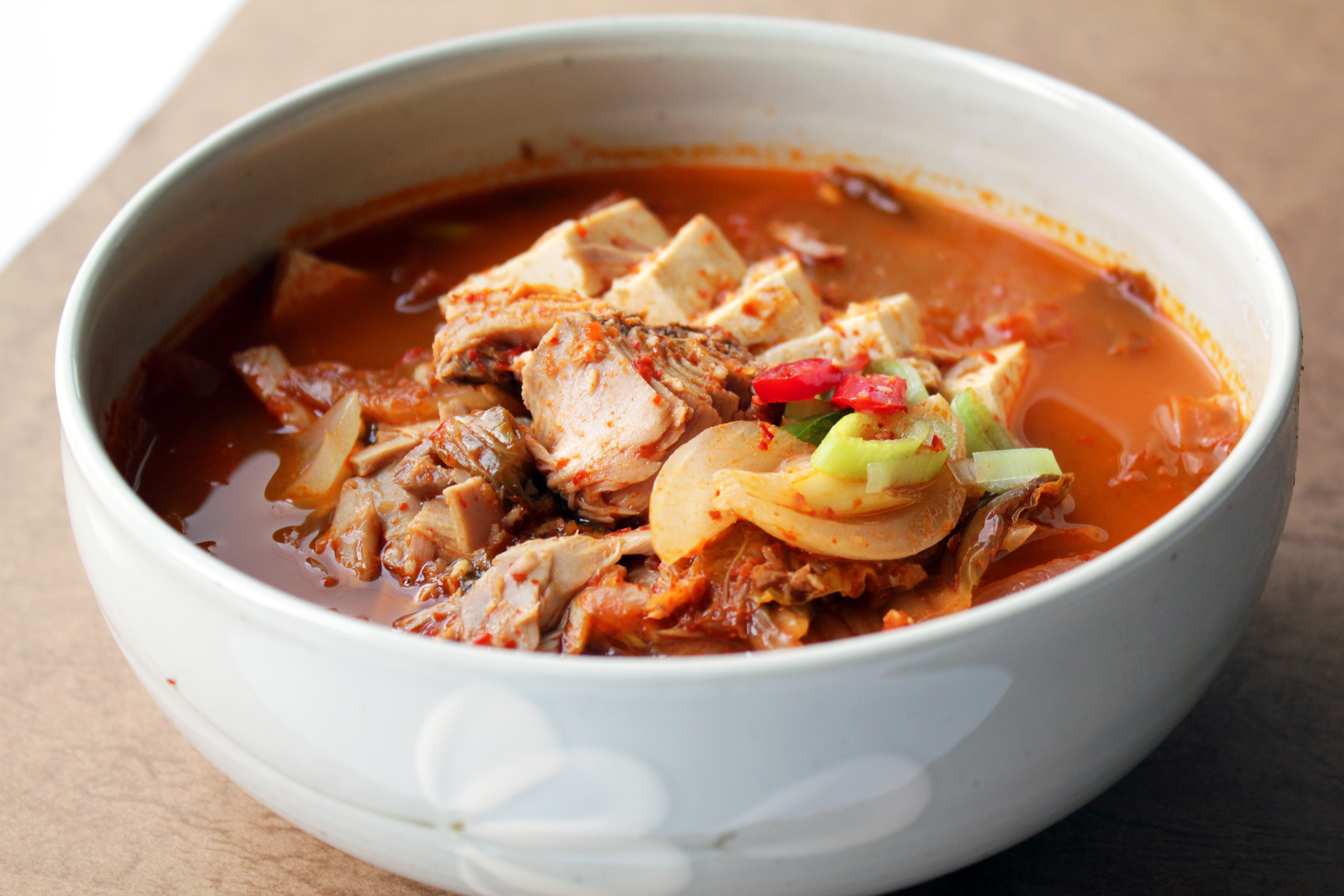
Tuna kimchi-jjigae

Beyond the standard ingredients of beef, pork, or chicken, some varieties are called by their particular names.

- Chamchi kimchi-jjigae (참치 김치찌개) is made with tuna, usually the canned type made specifically to use in jjigae. It is popular for camping trips or picnics, because of its ease of cooking and portability.
- Kkongchi kimchi-jjigae (꽁치 김치찌개) is made with Pacific saury.
- Budae-jjigae (부대찌개) is made by stewing kimchi with various ingredients not native to Korean cuisine, including Spam, hot dogs, and American cheese slices. Budae means "army base" in Korean; it originated during the Korean War, when South Koreans used ingredients procured from the US military.
- Vegan kimchi-jjigae (비건 김치찌개) is a plant based version of the stew; using ingredients such as kimchi, tofu, mushrooms, and vegetables. As it is a common cuisine it is a great cold weather comfort food.

== See also ==
- List of stews
