= Jjigae =

Category of Korean stews

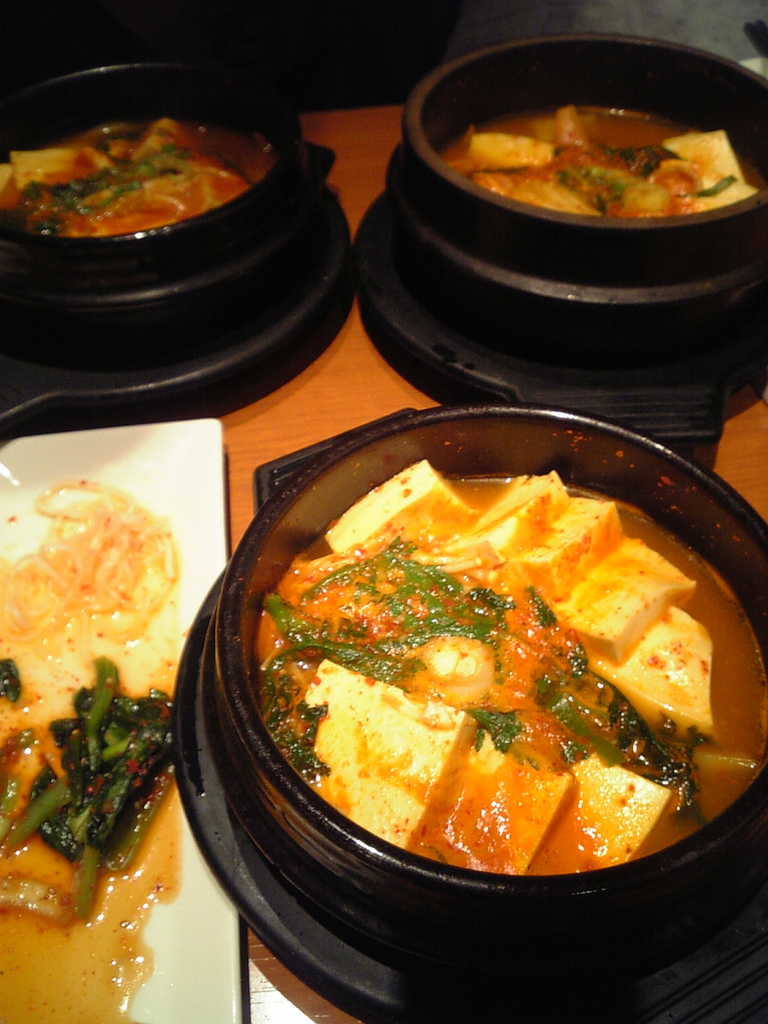
- Dubu jjigae (Korean tofu stew)
- Type: Stew
- Place of origin: Korea
- Region or state: East Asia
- Serving temperature: Hot
- Main ingredients: Meat, seafood or vegetables; broth

Korean name
- Hangul: 찌개
- RR: jjigae
- MR: tchigae

Jjigae (Korean: 찌개; pronounced [tɕ͈iɡɛ]) are Korean stews. There are many varieties; they are typically made with meat, seafood or vegetables in a broth seasoned with gochujang (red chili paste), doenjang (soy bean paste), ganjang (soy sauce) or saeu-jeot (salted and fermented shrimp). Jjigae is often served as a communal dish.

Korean meals often include either a jjigae or a guk. During the Joseon dynasty, it was known as jochi, and two varieties would always be present on the King's surasang (royal cuisine).

The types of jjigae are often named according to their principal ingredients, such as saengseon jjigae (생선찌개; lit. 'fish jjigae') made from fish or dubu jjigae (두부찌개; lit. 'tofu jjigae'). They are also sometimes named according to their broth and seasonings, for example gochujang jjigae (고추장찌개) or doenjang-jjigae (된장찌개).

Compared to jeongol, which primarily consists of broth or stock, jjigae have less liquid (roughly half solid ingredients) and have stronger seasoning. Common types include soy sauce jjigae and salted fish jjigae, also known as jeotguk jjigae (also called clear stew).

== Varieties ==
=== By ingredient ===
- Altang (알탕), made with pollock roe
- Dubu jjigae (두부 찌개), made with firm tofu
- Ge jjigae (게 찌개), made with crab
- Kimchi jjigae (김치 찌개), made with kimchi and other ingredients
- Kongbiji jjigae (콩비지 찌개), made with soybeans
- Budae jjigae (부대 찌개), made with a spicy broth and assorted meats and other ingredients
- Saengseon jjigae (생선 찌개), made with fish. Dongtae jjigae (동태 찌개) is made from frozen pollock.
- Sundubu jjigae (순두부 찌개), made with uncurdled soft tofu
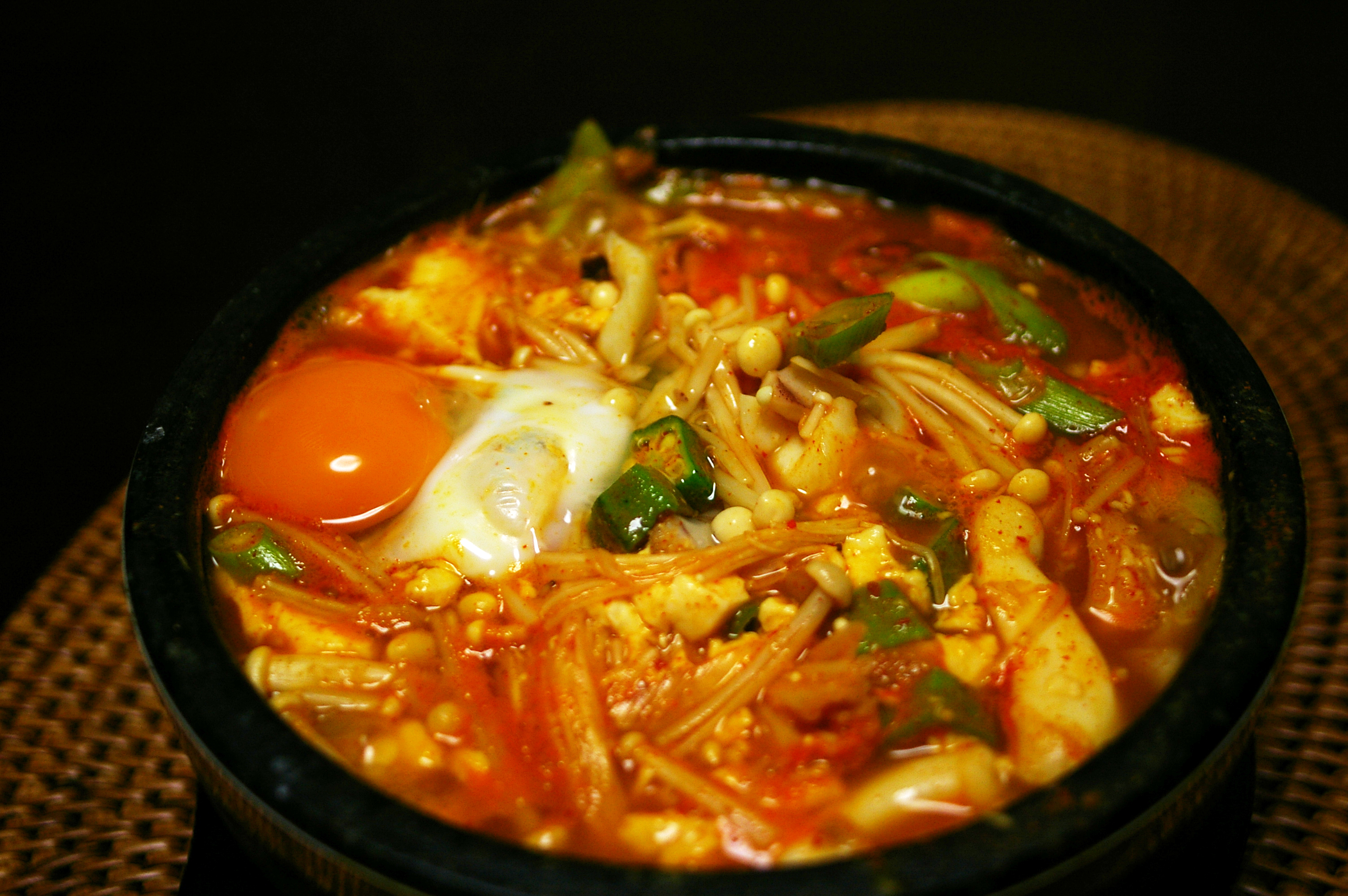
Sundubu jjigae

=== By condiment ===
- Doenjang jjigae (된장찌개), made with a doenjang broth
- Cheonggukjang jjigae (청국장찌개), made with cheonggukjang and other ingredients
- Saeujeot jjigae (새우젓찌개), made with saeujeot
- Gochujang jjigae (고추장찌개), made with gochujang broth, usually including pork
- Myeongranjeot jjigae (명란젓 찌개), made with myeongran jeot (salted fermented roe)
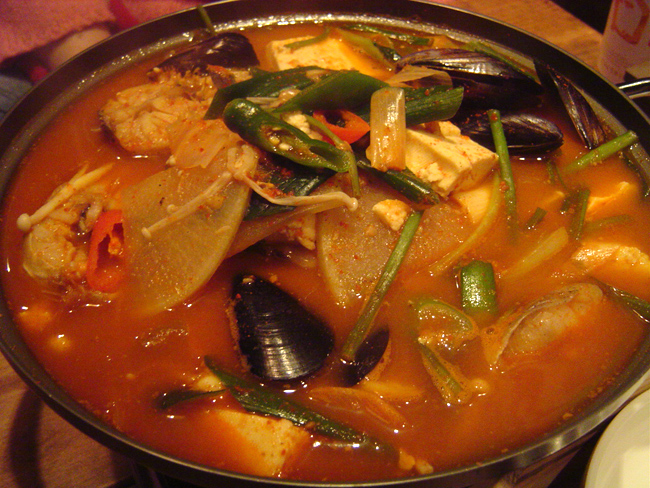
Hot dongtae jjigae, Korean pollack stew

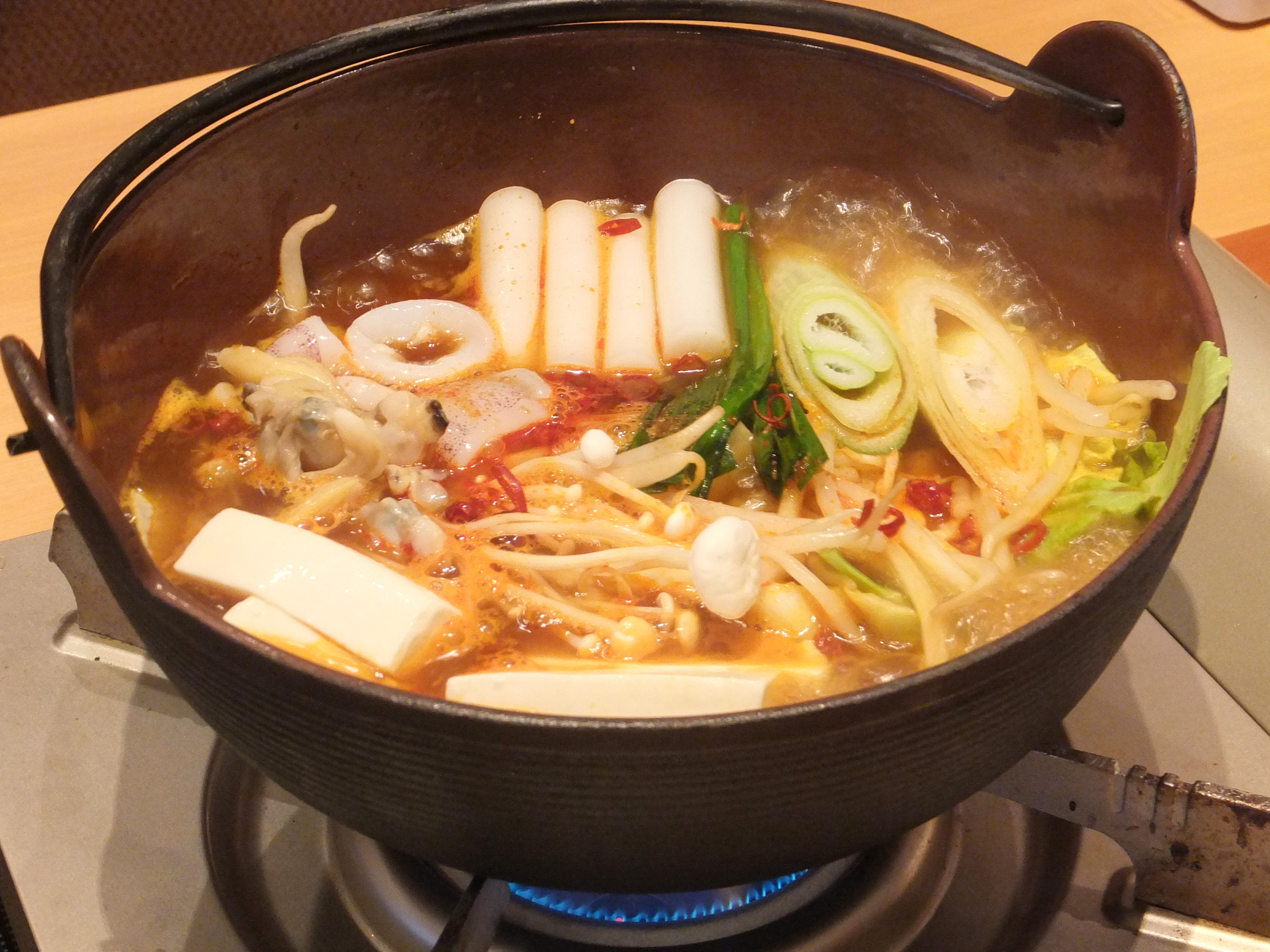

== See also ==
- Fish stew
- Korean cuisine
- List of soups
- List of stews
