= Gukbap =

Korean soup and rice dish

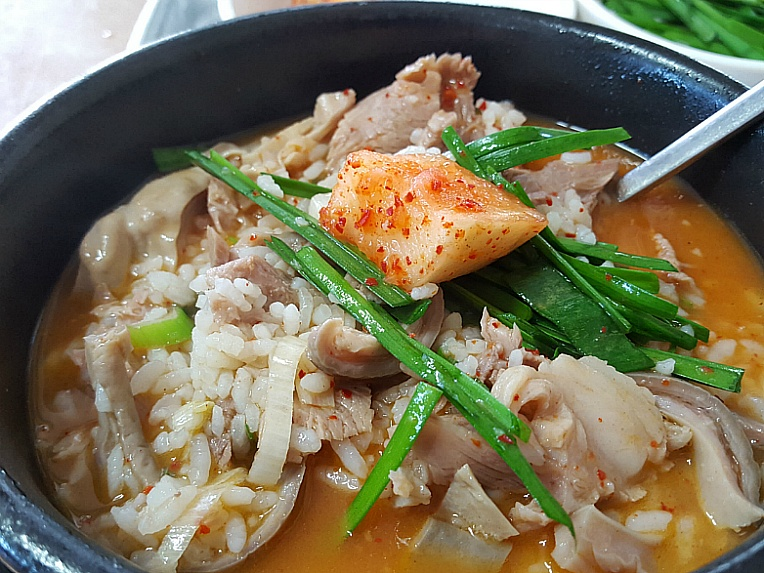
- Dwaeji-gukbap (pork and rice soup) with a cube of kkakdugi (diced radish kimchi)
- Place of origin: Korea
- Serving temperature: Hot
- Main ingredients: Guk (soup), bap (cooked rice)
- Similar dishes: Noodle soup

Korean name
- Hangul: 국밥
- Lit.: soup rice
- RR: gukbap
- MR: kukpap
- IPA: [kuk̚.p͈ap̚]

Gukbap (Korean: 국밥; lit. 'soup rice') is a Korean dish made by putting cooked rice into hot soup or boiling rice in soup. It is commonly served in a ttukbaegi. Whereas soup and rice is generally eaten separately in Korea, in gukbap, rice is expected to be mixed into the soup.

With jumaks, gukbap became popular especially in the late Joseon period.

== Origin ==
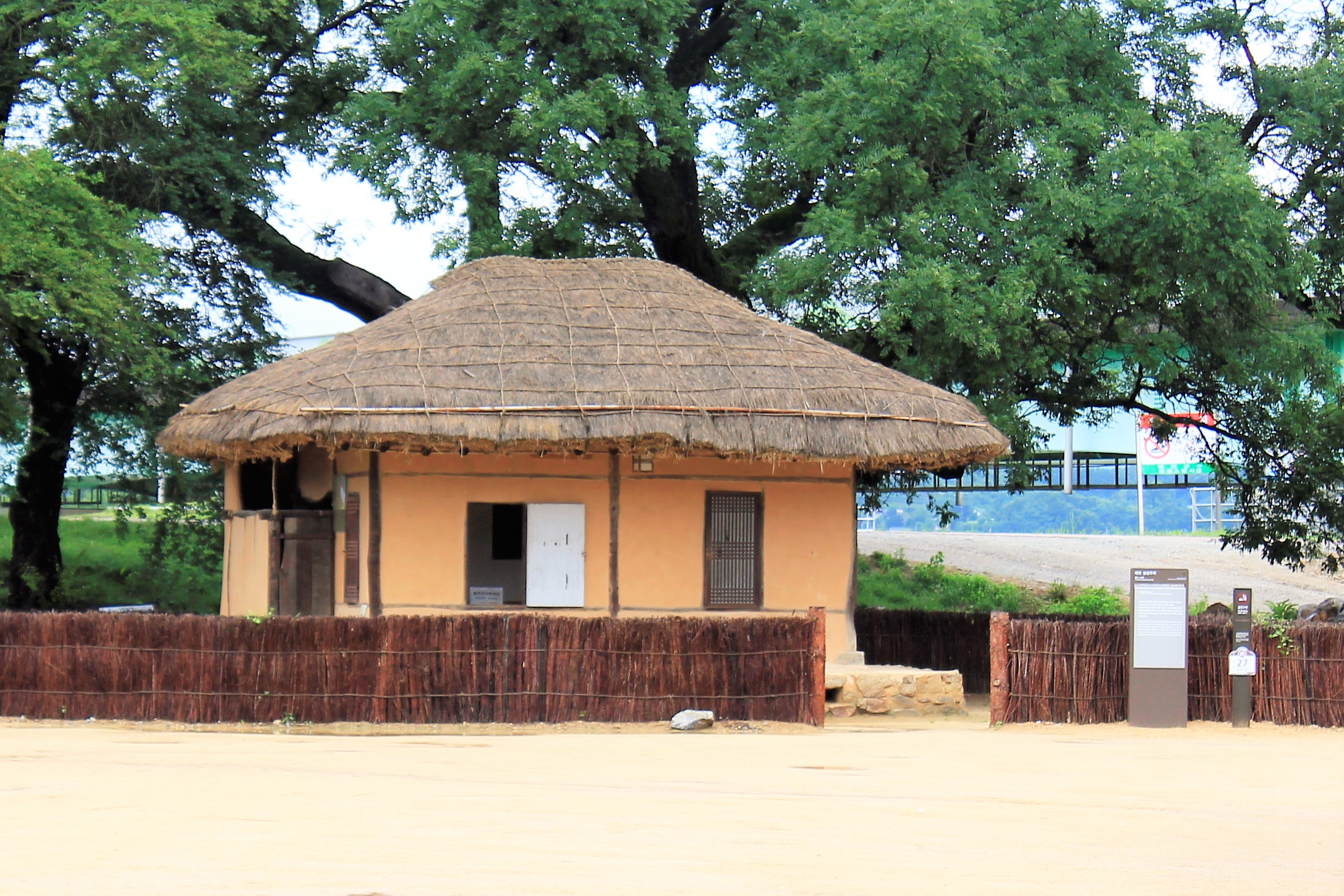
A jumak (tavern for merchants that served food and alcohol)

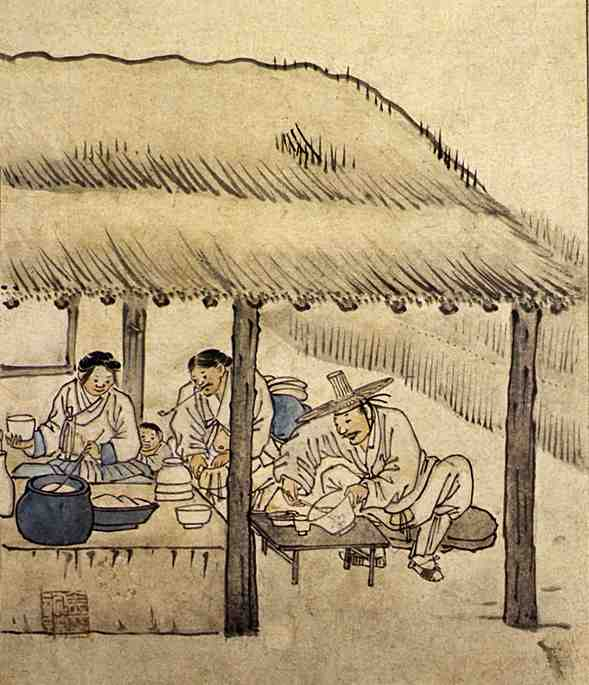
Gim Hong-do's "Jumak" painting depicting gukbap being served

The first record of gukbap in literature is in the "Journal of Royal Secretariat" (Seungjeongwon Ilgi). The journal stated that female physicians recommended the dish to King Sukjong due to its heartiness. During the Joseon period, gukbaps were served in jumaks, taverns for merchants. As jumaks began to develop along roadside areas, gukbap was given the name janggukbap: gukbap sold in jangsi (markets). Illustrations of gukbap being served in jumaks can be seen in Gim Hong-Do's paintings from the Joseon Dynasty. In the art piece, a barmaid is serving the dish while a customer opens a pouch to pay for his meal.

Rituals through ancestral rites were common in the Joseon Dynasty. At these rites, meat dishes from pigs and cattle were regularly present. Due to the frequency of these rituals, a meat-eating culture developed and meat based soups, like gukbap, became popular. The first gukbap recipe in Korean literature is the Gyugon Yoram from the 18th century. This recipe states that it is made by "placing oily meat stewed in a sauce over the rice". The broth is made by boiling down pork bones to create a cloudy, translucent, or clear appearance. Those of the western part of the South Gyeongsang Province developed a leaner clear broth. During the 19th century, the dish became commercialized and was sold in large-scale markets. In the Japanese colonial period, gukbap began to gain popularity as a common delivery food. According to a magazine published in 1929, the owners of gukbap diners were often people of low social status, so it was not easy for those who were once aristocrats to eat it with confidence. Digging into this niche market, gukbap has been recognized as the first fast food as well as the first delivery food. After Korea's liberation from Japan and the Korean War, variations of the dish began to emerge by region. Then, ever more places sold simple meals for workers, resulting in a variety of gukbap by region. As a result, Gukbap is known as the first fast food in Korea because of its affordability.

Until the 1970s, when there were no refrigerators and heating cabinets, once the rice was cooked, it was spread flat on a wicker tray and stored in a cool place. When an order was placed, the rice was put in a bowl, and the broth was poured in and out several times to make it warm. Until then, pouring hot broth over the rice was common, and since the broth was absorbed into the grain of the rice, its taste improved. With the introduction of the heating cabinet, ttarogukbap(rice and soup served separately) emerged. Technological advances caused the preparation of gukbap to vary over time.

== Etymology ==
Gukbap is a compound of guk (soup) and bap (cooked rice).

== Varieties ==
- Dwaeji gukbap (돼지국밥) – pork and rice soup made from boiling pig bones in meat broth and eaten with boiled pork slices. The history of dwaeji-gukbap dates back to the Korean War, when war refugees made seolleongtang using easily obtained pig bones instead of scarcer beef bones.
- Sogogi-gukbap (소고기국밥) – beef and rice soup.
- Someori-gukbap (소머리국밥) – ox head soup.
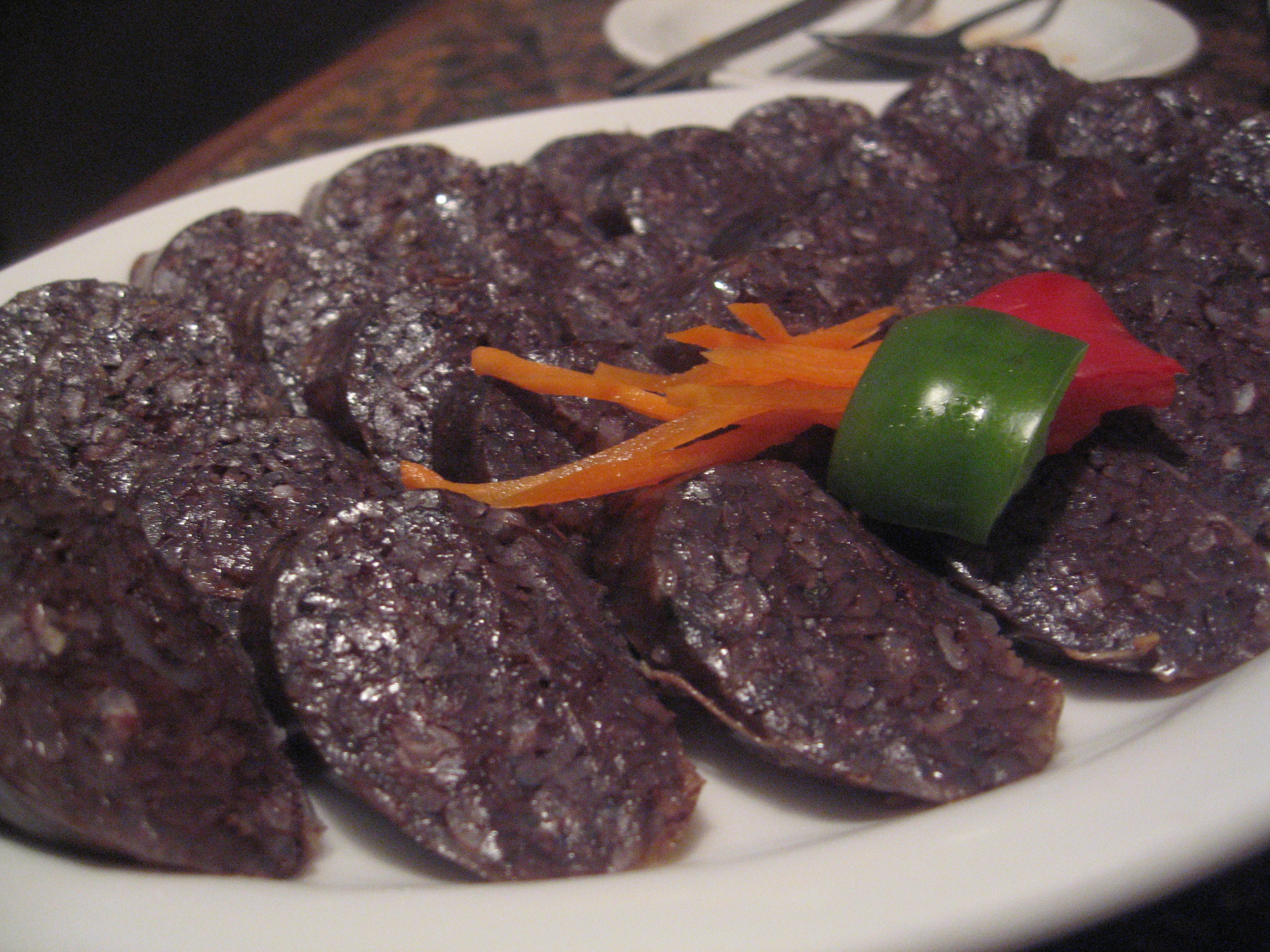
- Korean blood sausage that is used as the meat product in sundae-gukbap
  Sundae-gukbap (순대국밥) – sundae (Korean sausage) and rice soup.
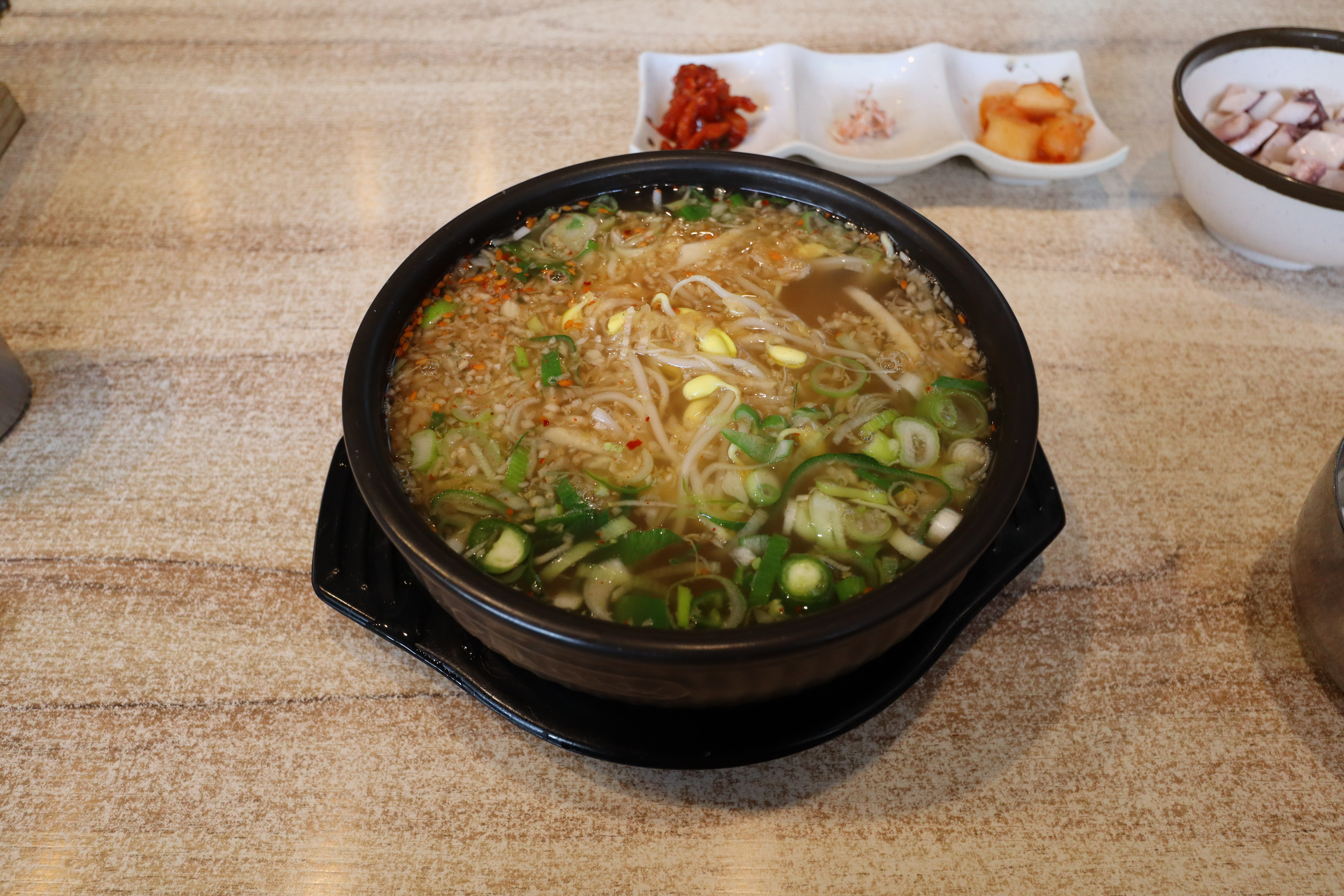
- Kongnamul-gukbap
  Kongnamul-gukbap (콩나물국밥) – kongnamul (soybean sprouts) and rice soup. Usually seasoned with garlic and salt and cooked in an iron pot. In Jeonju, kongnamul-gukbap became famous because water is very important in kongnamul-gukbap and Jeonju is famous for its clean water.
- Gul-gukbap (굴국밥) – oyster and rice soup.
- Siraegi-gukbap (시래기국밥) – siraegi (dried mucheong) and rice soup.
- Ttaro-gukbap (따로국밥) – guk (soup) and bap (cooked rice) served in separate bowls.
