= Cheongjinok =

Historic restaurant in Seoul, South Korea

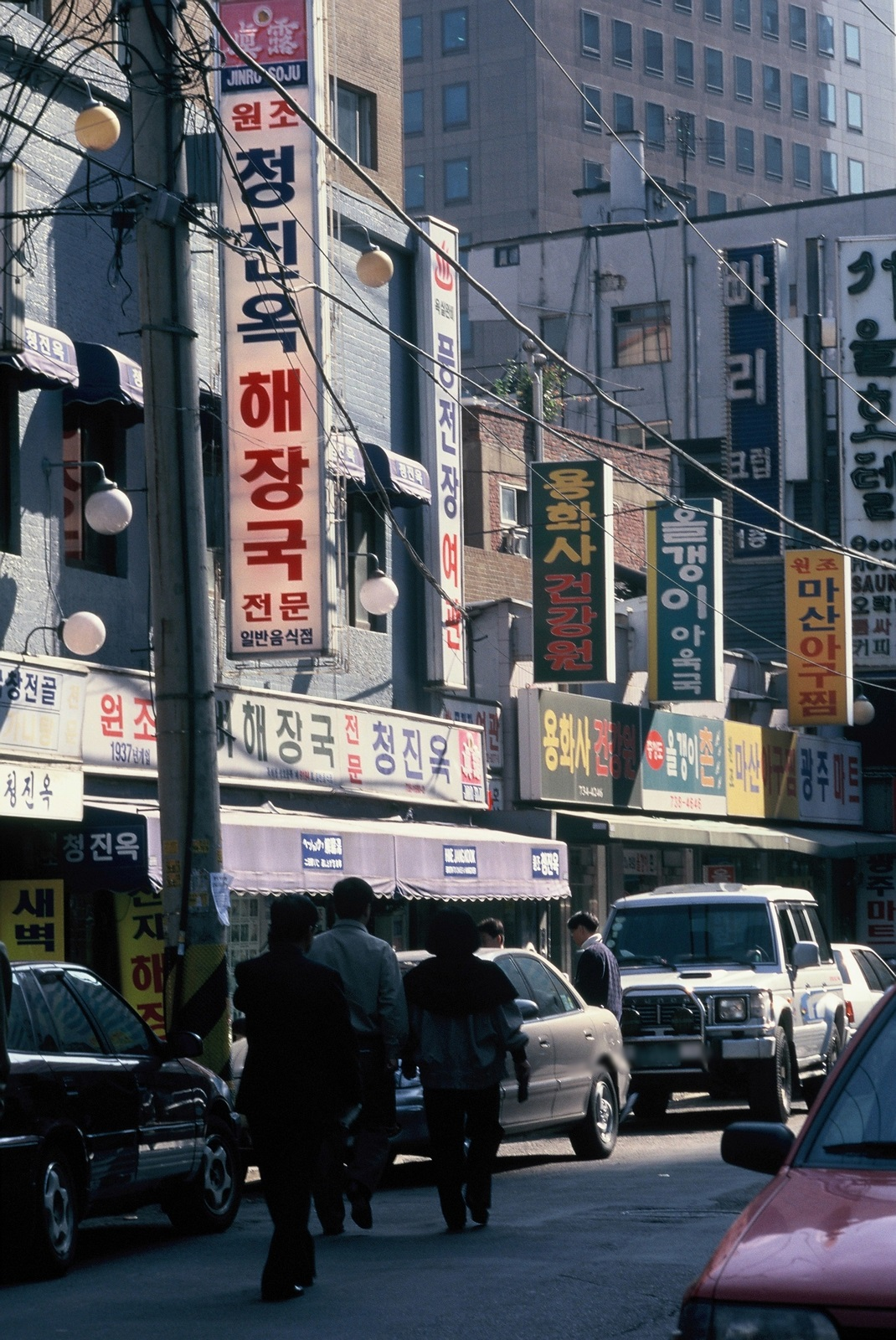
- Cheongjinok in 1999

General information
- Coordinates: 37.5716°N 126.9793°E
- Designations

Seoul Future Heritage
- Reference no.: 2013-250

Restaurant information
- Established: 1937; 88 years ago
- Food type: Korean cuisine, haejang-guk
- Location: 32 Jong-ro 3-gil, Jongno District, Seoul, South Korea
- Website: www.cheongjinok.com

Cheongjinok (Korean: 청진옥) is a historic Korean restaurant in Cheongjin-dong, Jongno District, Seoul, South Korea. It is the sixth-oldest active restaurant in Seoul, having been founded in 1937. It specializes in the hangover soup dish haejang-guk.

In 2013, it was made a Seoul Future Heritage in recognition of its historical value and quality.

== History ==
The restaurant was founded in 1937 (during the Japanese colonial period, when Seoul was called Keijō), near its current location, by couple Choi Dong-seon (최동선) and Lee Gan-nan (이간난). It was founded in around a time when there were many lumberjacks who worked in the area; it was popular among this demographic. Reportedly, early in its history, rice was scarce, so it was commonplace for people to bring their own rice with them to the restaurant. Like with another soup dish seolleongtang, haejang-guk was popular amongst the working class and seen as a representative dish of Keijō. Eventually, the restaurant was passed onto the second generation of owners: Choi Chang-ik and Kim Jae-in. They gave way to a third generation; Choi Chang-ik died in 2005. The third generation owner had been working at a company, and reportedly had not intended to take over the family business.

In a 2016 article, the restaurant owner claimed in an interview that the restaurant had 12 employees with an average age of 58 and average tenure at the restaurant of 18.5 years. One member of its staff had worked there from age 16 to 67. One of its security guards worked there for 45 years.

Fires in the restaurant reportedly run at all hours. The restaurant began selling prepackaged versions of its soups in 2013.
