= Haejang-guk =

Korean soup used to cure hangovers

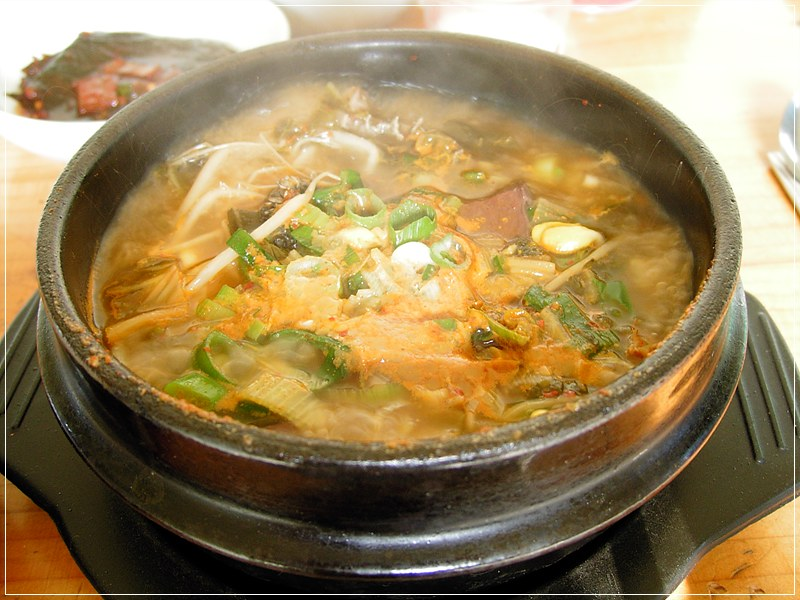
- Seonji-guk, a type of haejang-guk
- Alternative names: Hangover soup
- Type: Guk
- Course: Hangover food
- Place of origin: Korea
- Main ingredients: Napa cabbage, beef broth, offal

Korean name
- Hangul: 해장국
- Hanja: 解酲국
- RR: haejangguk
- MR: haejangkuk
- IPA: Korean pronunciation: [hɛ.dʑaŋ.k͈uk̚]

Haejang-guk (Korean: 해장국) or hangover soup refers to every kind of guk or soup eaten as a hangover cure in Korean cuisine. It means "soup to chase a hangover" and is also called sulguk (술국). It usually consists of dried napa cabbage, vegetables and meat in a hearty beef broth. One type of haejangguk, seonjiguk, includes sliced congealed ox blood (similar to black pudding), and another type, sundaeguk, includes blood sausage made with intestine stuffed with pig's blood and other ingredients.

== History ==
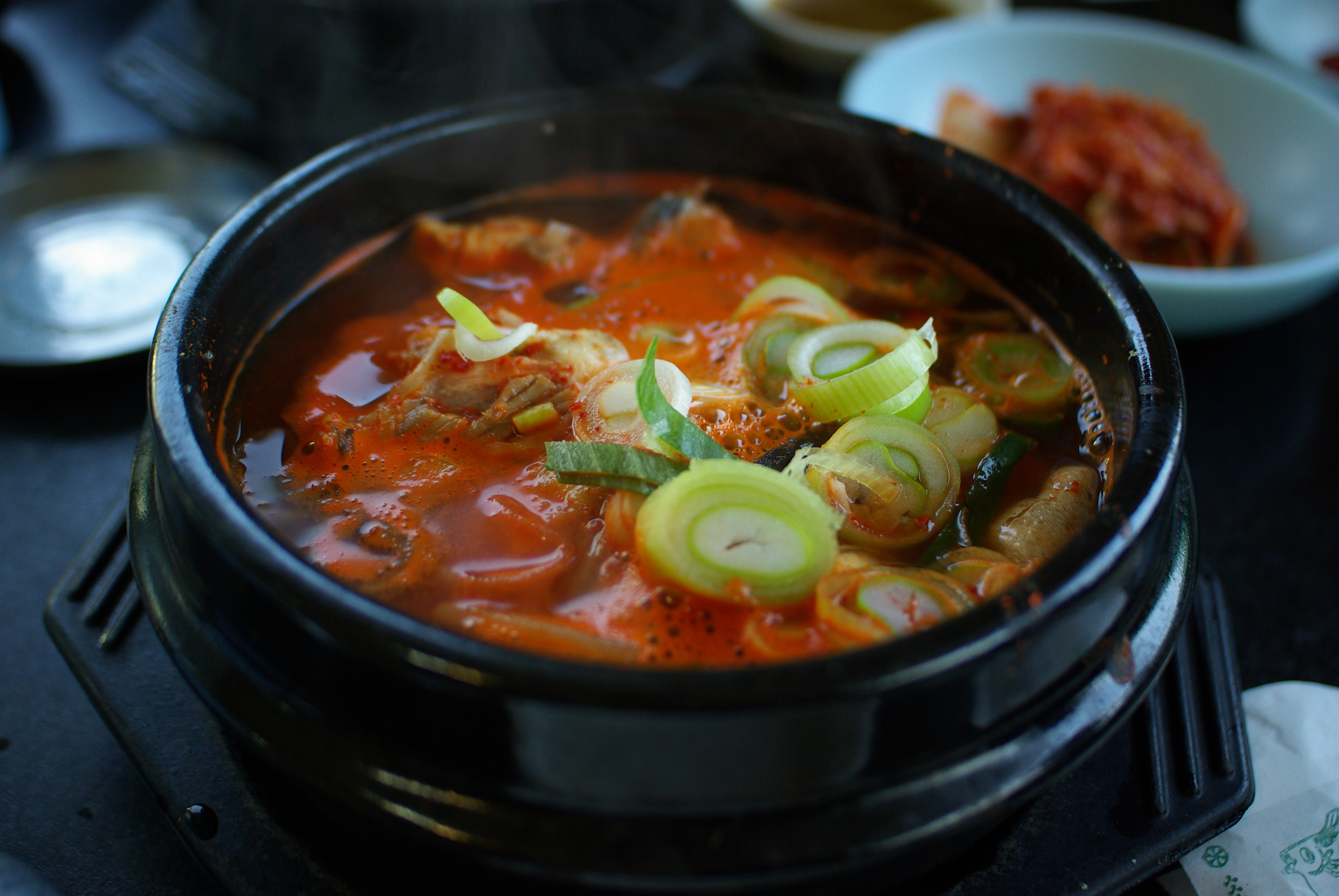
Pufferfish haejang-guk

In the Nogeoldae, a manual for learning spoken Chinese published in the late Goryeo dynasty (918–1392), the term seongjutang (Chinese: 醒酒湯) appears. It means "soup to get sober" and is assumed to be the origin of haejangguk. According to the record, the soup consists of thinly sliced meat, noodles, scallions, and powder of cheoncho (천초) in a broth. The composition is same as the basic recipe of a present-day haejangguk.

Although haejangguk is not mentioned in cookbooks written during the Joseon (1392–1910), relevant contents can be seen in genre paintings and documents of the late Joseon. In Shin Yun-bok (b. 1758)'s painting titled Jumakdo (Korean: 주막도 "Painting of the Tavern"), a scene regarding haejangguk is well depicted. A group of unemployed children of the rich gather to eat haejangguk while a jumo (a female owner of a jumak) ladles boiling soup out of a cauldron.

This dish seemed to be eaten not only by commoners. According to Haedong jukji (海東竹枝), poetry collection written by Choe Yeong-nyeon (崔永年 1856~1935), haejangguk is referred to as hyojonggaeng (曉鍾羹), which literally means a "dawn bell soup". The book states that the area within Namhansanseong is known for making the soup well. The ingredients for the soup are inner parts of napa cabbage, and kongnamul (soybean sprouts), mushrooms, galbi, sea cucumber, and abalone. They are mixed together with tojang (fermented bean paste) and are simmered thoroughly for a day. The cooked soup is then put into a hangari or earthen crock covered with a pad of cotton and sent to Seoul at night. When the dawn bell rings the time, the soup is delivered to a house of high-ranking officials. The hangari is still warm and the soup is very good for relieving hangovers. The record suggests that hyojonggaeng is either the first delivery food to cure a hangover after a banquet held by jaesang was ended or was used as a bribe. The restaurant Cheongjinok, one of the oldest active restaurants in Seoul, specializes in haejang-guk.

== Types ==
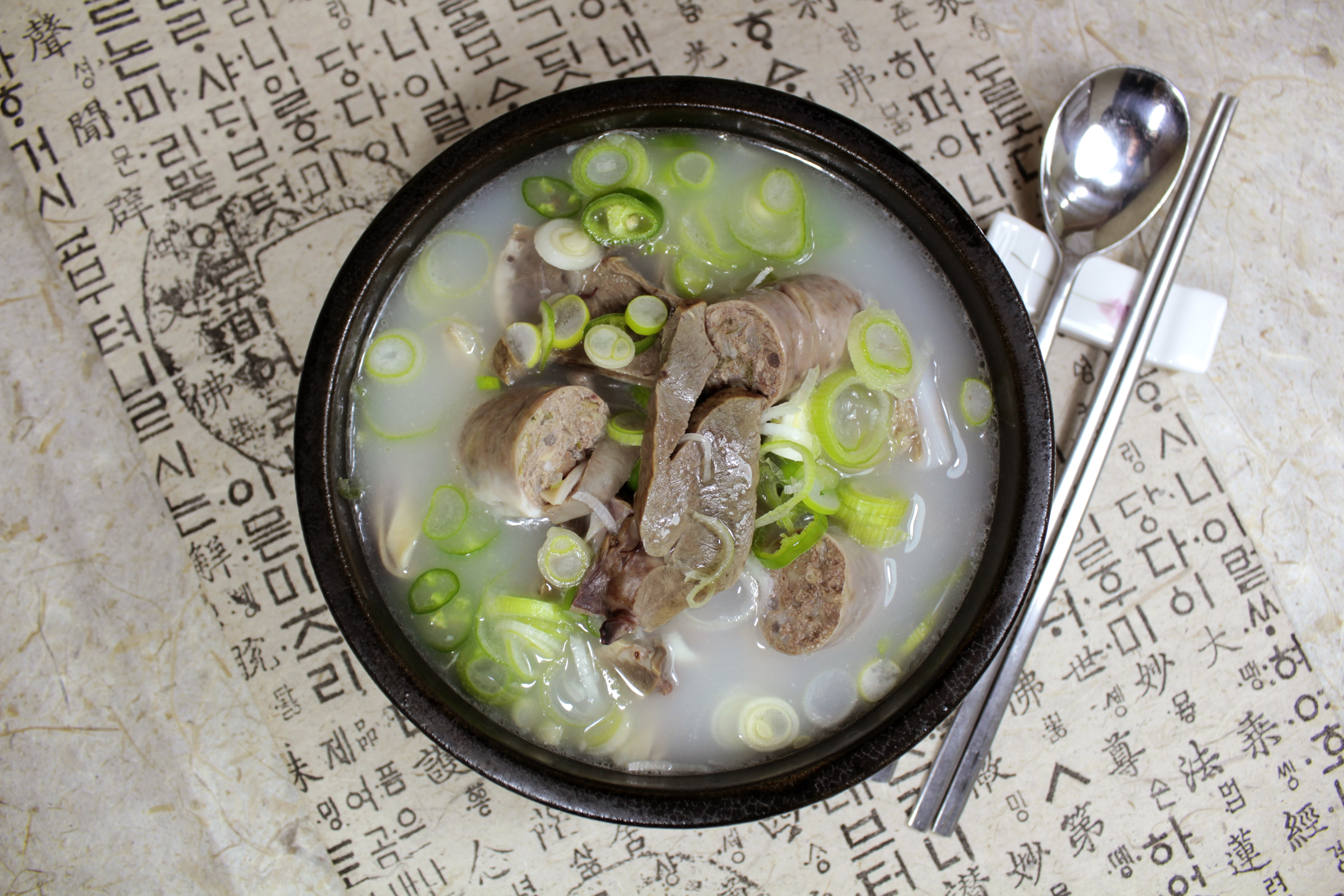
White haejang-guk (also known as seolleongtang)

There are various types of haejangguk according to region based on ingredients and recipe that give each variety its own characteristic taste. Haejangguk of the Seoul region is a kind of tojangguk (soybean paste soup) made with kongnamul, radish, napa cabbage, scallions, coagulated ox blood, and tojang in a broth. The broth is prepared by simmering ox bones in a pot with water for hours. The neighborhood of Cheongjin-dong is famous for the Seoul-style haejangguk.

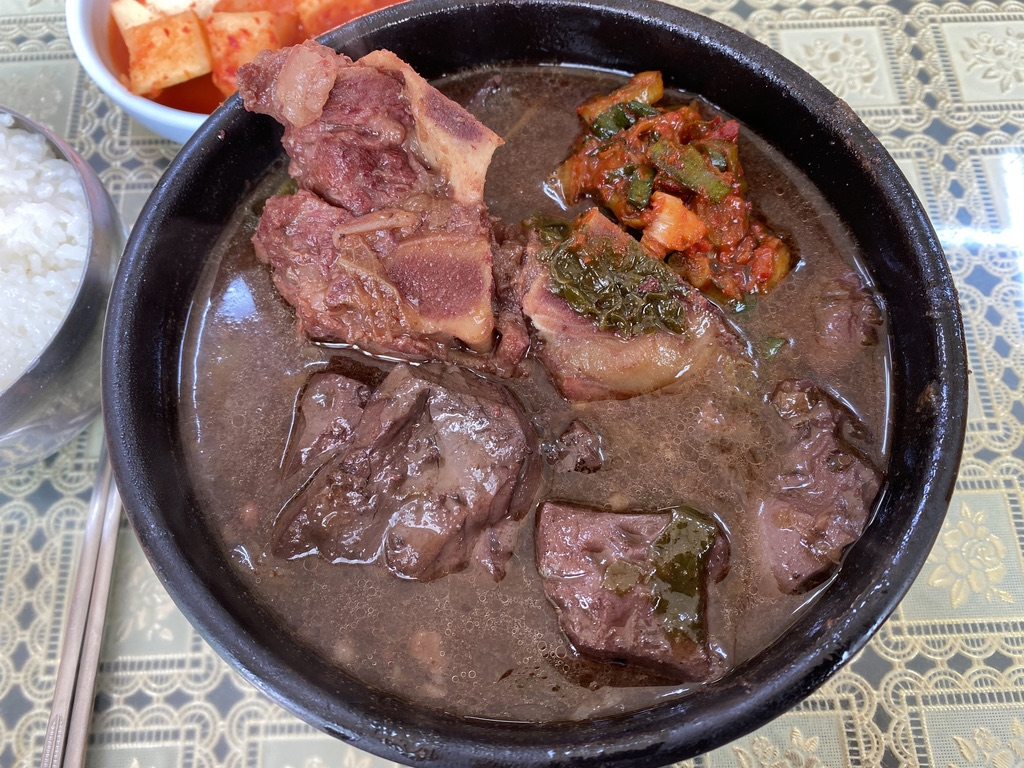
Haejang-guk with beef

In the city of Jeonju, people eat kongnamul gukbap as a haejangguk. A little lean kongnamul with the length of an index finger are poached in water diluted with a small amount of salt. Along with the kongnamul, steamed rice, sliced ripe kimchi, scallions and garlic, beef broth, and a small amount of shank are put into a ttukbaegi (a small earthen pot) over heat and the kongnamul broth is poured into it. When the ingredients are boiled, a raw egg is cracked over the soup. Once it is served, a mixture of sesame seeds and salt, scallions, minced garlic, chili pepper, and chili pepper powder, and saeujeot (salted fermented shrimp) are put into the haejanguk are added according to the diner's taste. It is said that, when eating haejangguk, if the diner drinks a cup of moju (母酒) made by boiling a fermented mixture of makgeolli (a type of rice wine), sugar, and wheat flour, the combination may alleviate a hangover.

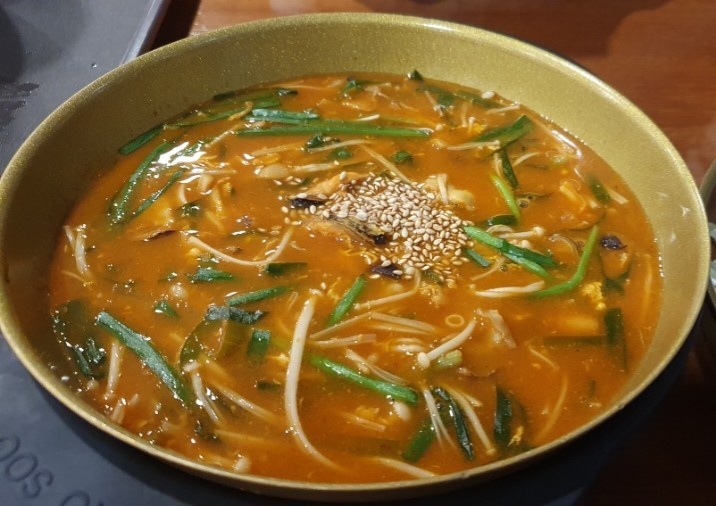
Seopguk

Yangyang and Sokcho in the east coast of Korea are known for their mussels, as such a type of haejangguk, called seopguk (섭국) is developed by the locals. Seop in the Gangwon dialect means "mussels", so seopguk translates to "mussel soup". It is in season from late winter to early spring. The dish is prepared by boiling mussels with chives, mushrooms, eggs, and seasoned with doenjang and gochujang.

There are also haejangguk with cold soup. On the shore of the Sea of Japan, especially in Uljin County, "ojingeo mulhoe guksu" (오징어물회국수) is eaten as a haejangguk. Finely sliced squid-like noodles are mixed with a sauce and cold water is poured over it along with ice cubes.

- Ugeojiguk (우거지국) - made with ugeoji (우거지, outer leaves of napa cabbage)
- Seonjiguk (선짓국) - made with seonji (선지, coagulated ox blood)
- Jaecheopguk (재첩국) - made with jaecheop (Corbicula fluminea) and buchu (garlic chives)
- Gulgukbap (굴국밥) - made with oyster and buchu

== Gallery ==
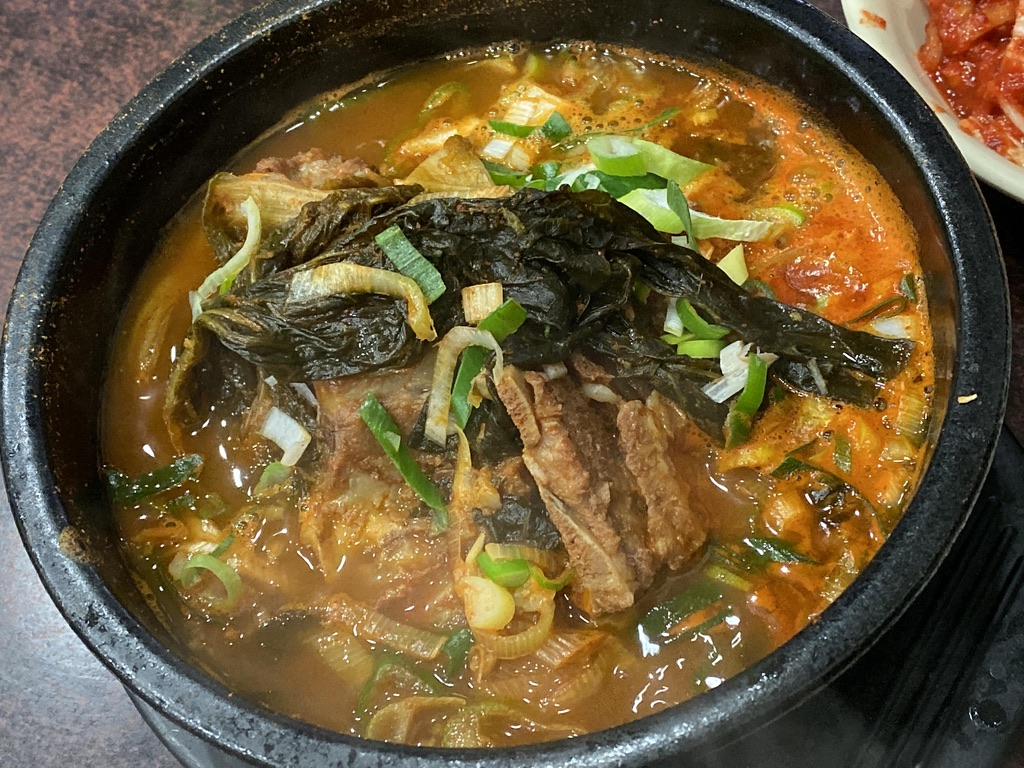

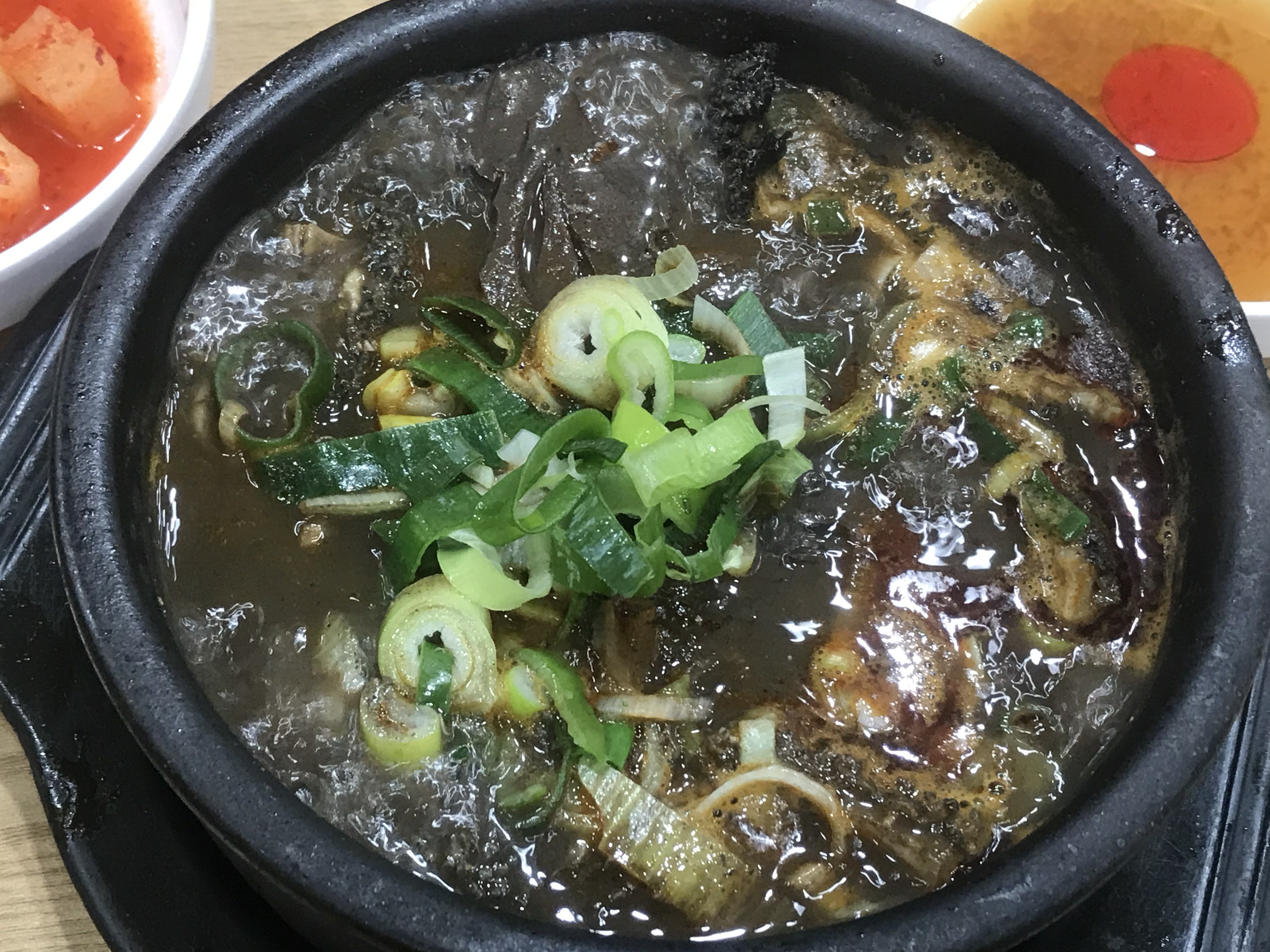

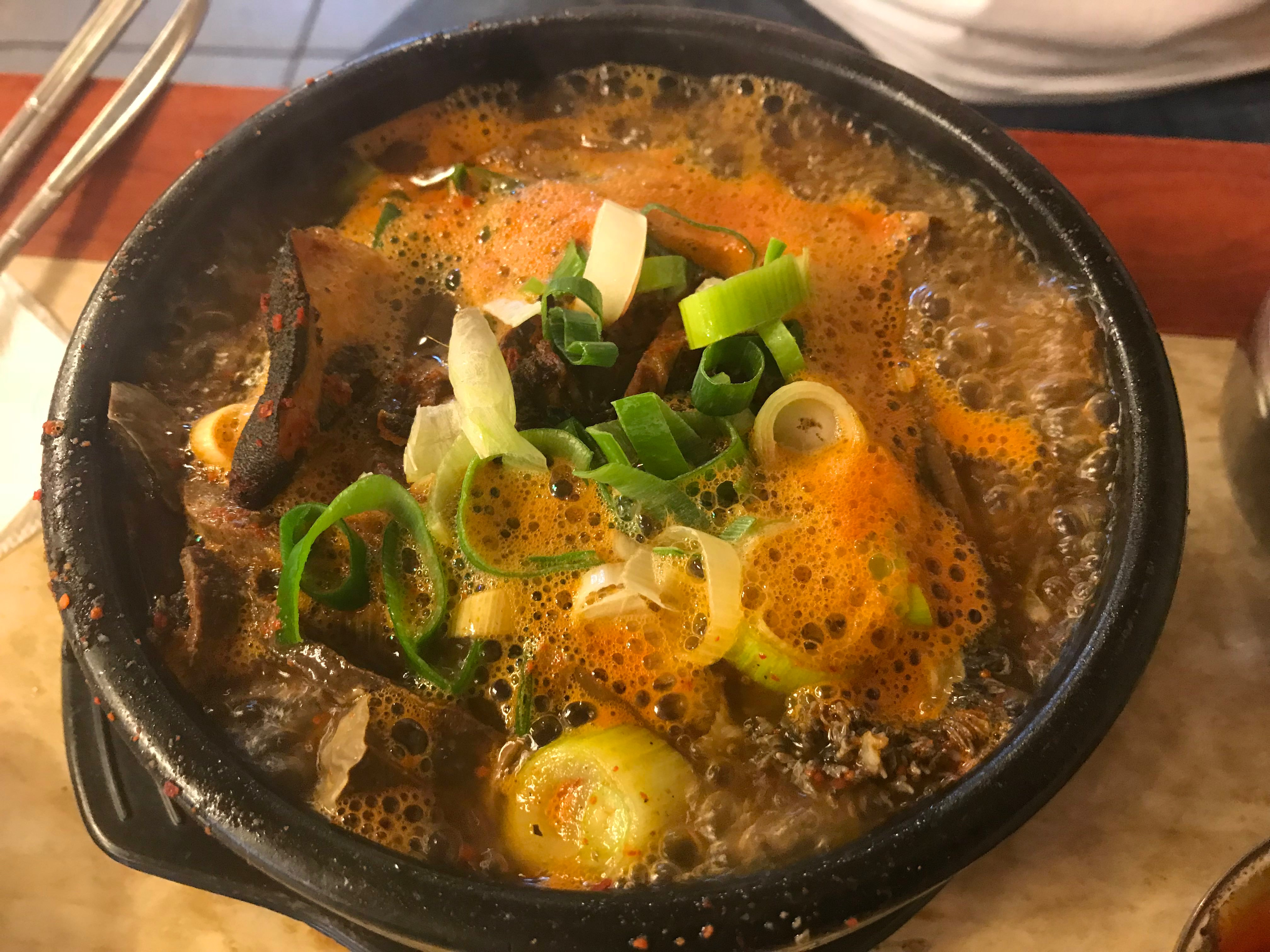

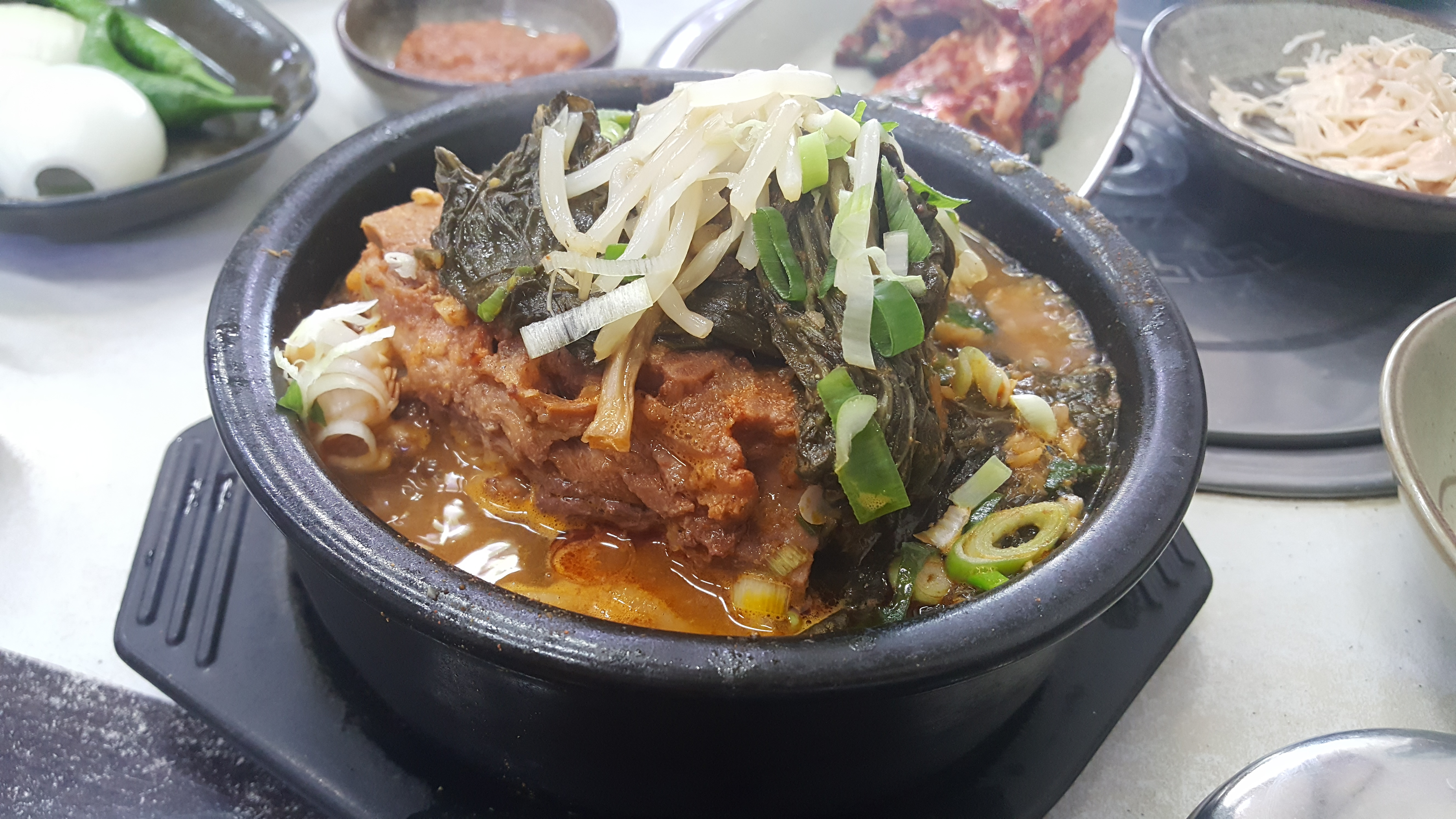

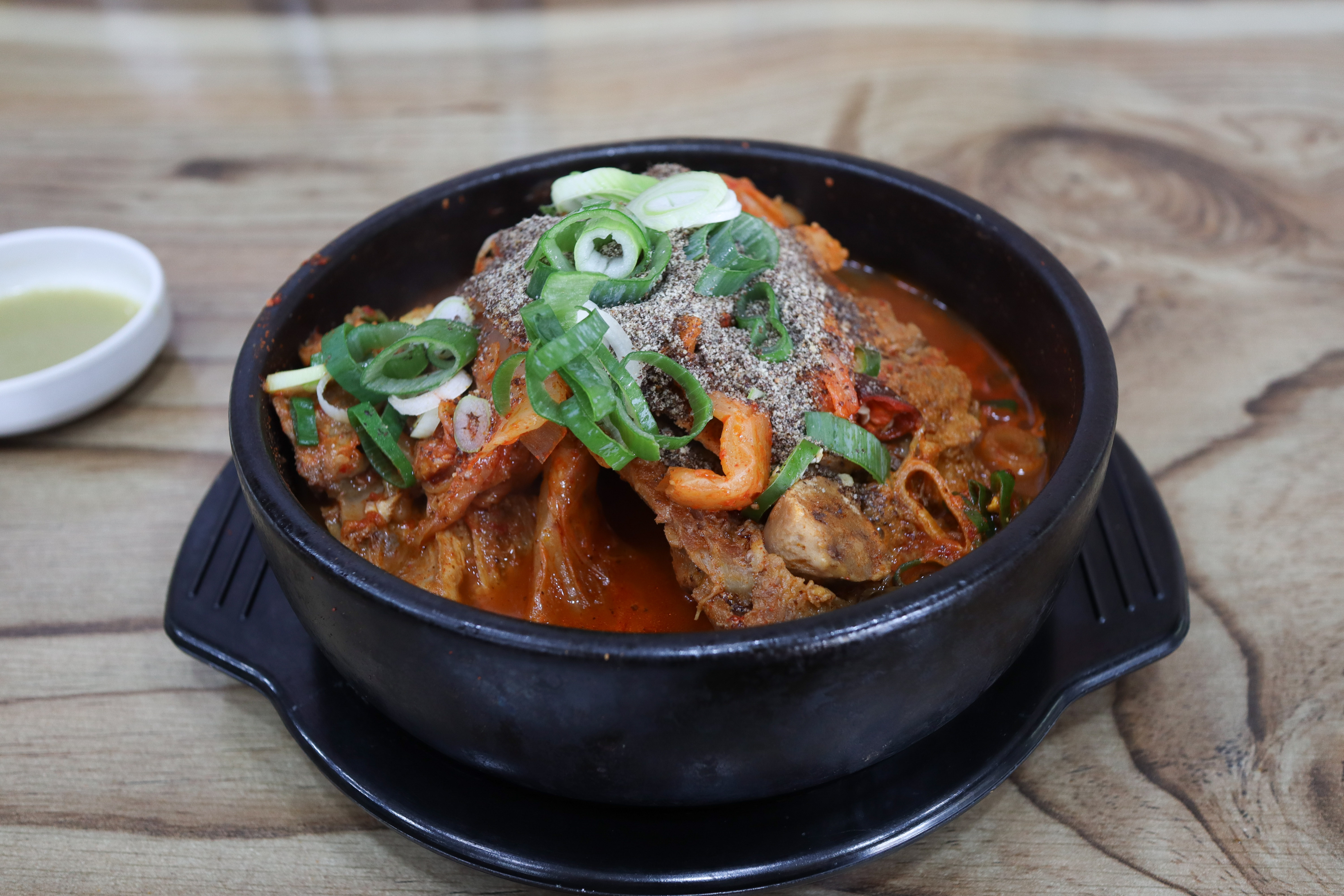

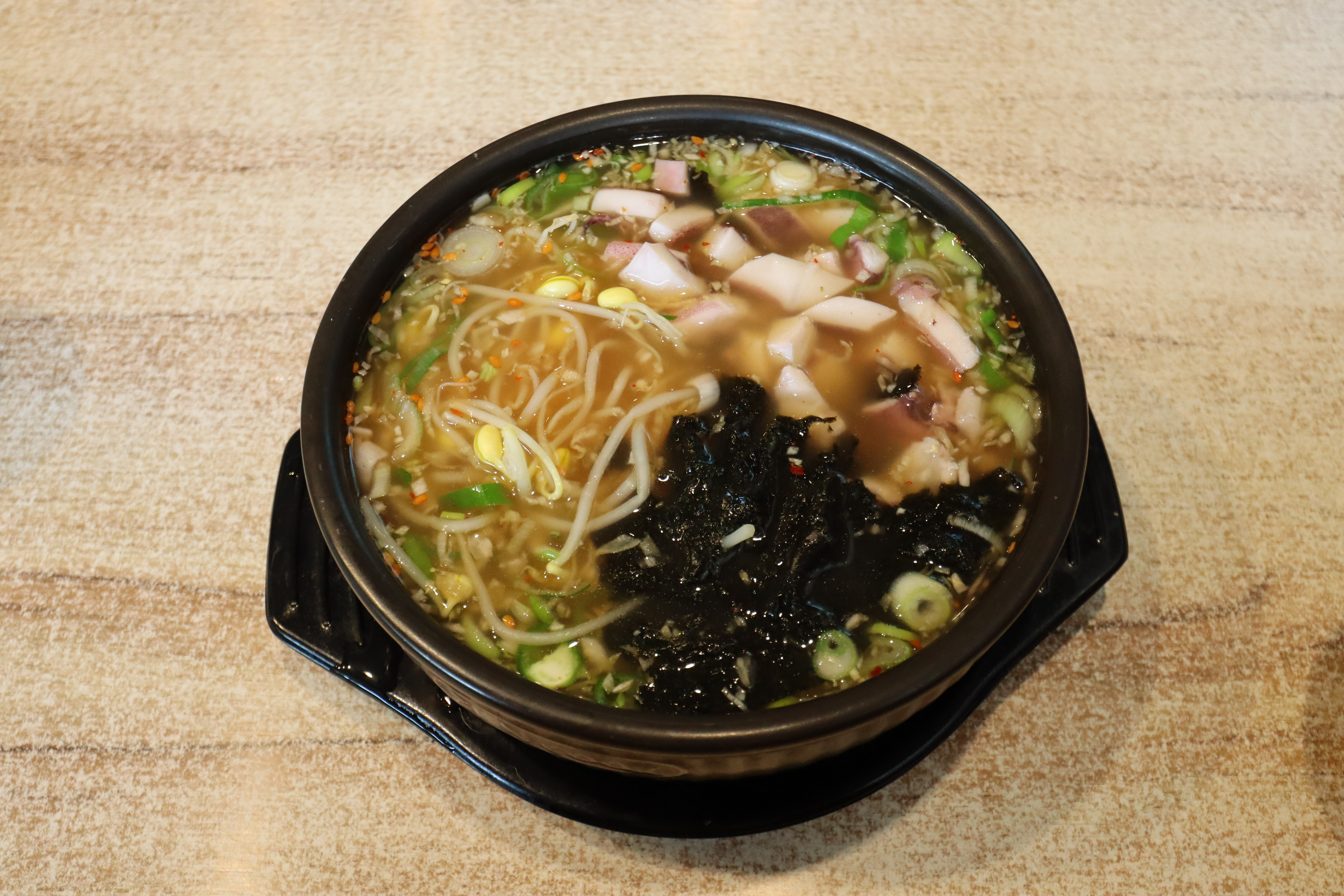

== See also ==
- Blood as food
- Hangover food
- List of soups
- Hangover drinks in South Korea
- Jjigae
