= Pork bone soup =

Pork bone soup may refer to one of the following Asian noodle soups:

- Gamjatang (감자탕), a Korean soup
- Kyay oh, a Burmese noodle soup
- Tonkotsu (豚骨), a Japanese noodle broth
