= Guk =

Korean soup-like dish

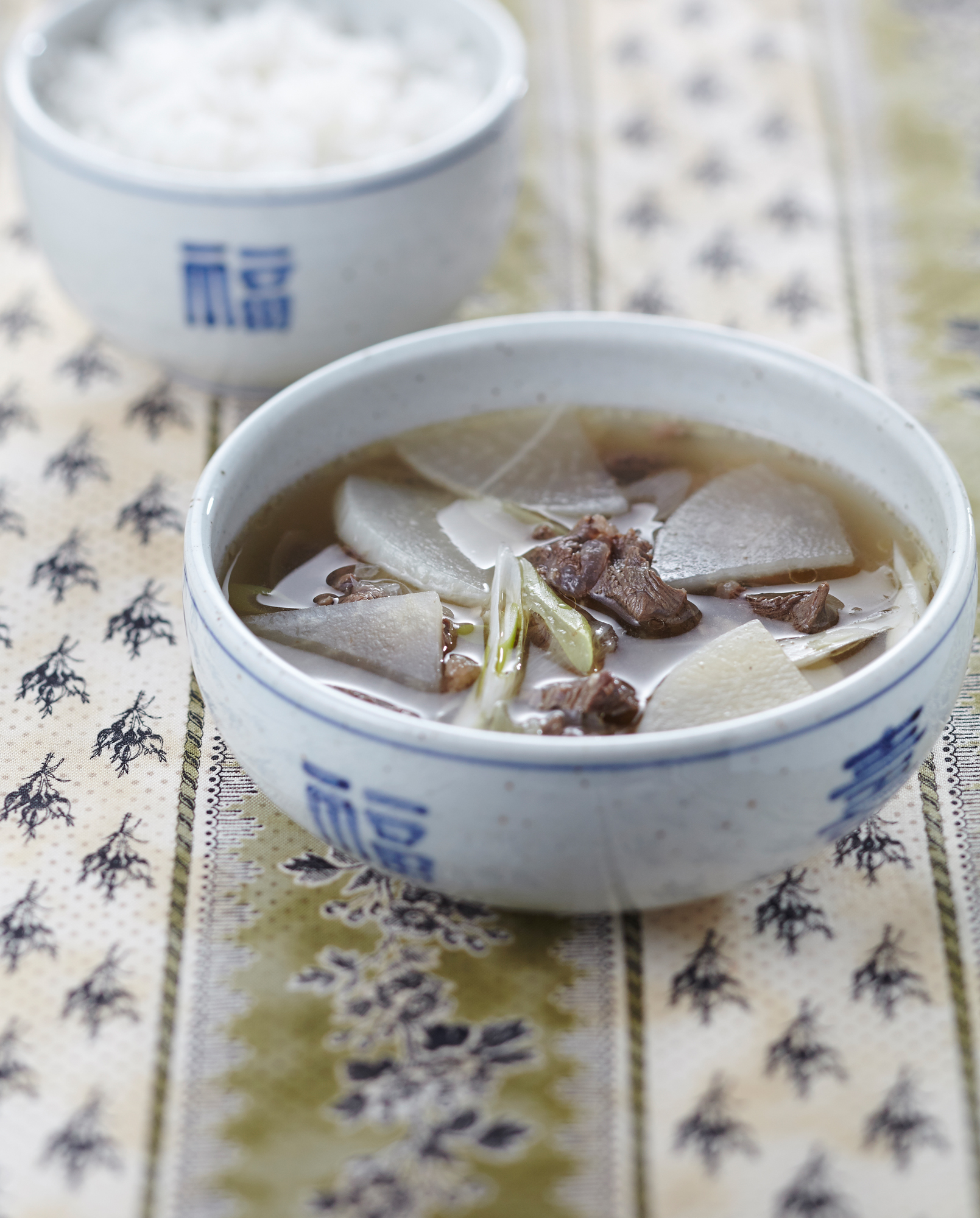
- Soegogi-mu-guk (beef and radish soup)
- Alternative names: Tang
- Type: Soup
- Place of origin: Korea

Korean name
- Hangul: 국
- RR: guk
- MR: kuk
- IPA: [kuk̚]

Alternate name
- Hangul: 탕
- Hanja: 湯
- RR: tang
- MR: t'ang
- IPA: [tʰaŋ]

Guk (Korean: 국), also sometimes known as tang (탕; 湯), is a category of soup dishes in Korean cuisine. Guk and tang are commonly grouped together and used interchangeably. They are regarded as the same type of soup, although tang can sometimes be a little thicker than guk. It is one of the most basic components in a Korean meal, along with bap (밥, rice), and banchan (반찬, side dishes). In Korean table setting, guk is served on the right side of bap (rice), and left side of sujeo (수저, a spoon and chopsticks).

Guk is a native Korean word, while tang is a Sino-Korean word that originally meant "boiling water" or "soup". Tang has been used as an honorific term in place of guk, when it denotes the same meaning as guk as in yeonpo-tang (연포탕, octopus soup), daegu-tang (대구탕, codfish soup), or jogae-tang (조개탕, clam soup). Generally, the names of lighter soups with vegetables are suffixed with -guk, while heavier, thicker soups made with more solid ingredients used in jesa (ancestral rites) are often referred to as tang. Gamja-guk (potato soup) and gamja-tang (pork back-bone stew) are different dishes; the potato soup can be called gamjeo-tang.

== Types ==
Guk is largely categorized into four groups of soups, such as malgeun jangguk (맑은 장국), gomguk (곰국), tojangguk (토장국), and naengguk (냉국). Malgeun jangguk literally means "clear (malgeun, 맑은) soup (guk, 국) seasoned with a condiment (jang, 장)," such as doenjang (soy bean paste) or ganjang, and is served in a bansang (반상, regular meal table). The main ingredients for malgeun jangguk are meat, fish, vegetables, and seafoods. Gomguk, also called gomtang, refers to either a heartier, thicker soup broth made by boiling various beef parts such as rib, oxtail, brisket, head, and so forth for a long time, or made with ox bone by the same method. The broth of gomguk tends to have a milky color and to be rich and hearty taste. This type of broth produces many health benefits, like collagen and minerals due to the long process of boiling meat bones for hours. It can also be made with chicken or pork bone, to produce samgyetang or gamjatang.

Tojangguk are based on doenjang broth and ssaltteumul (쌀뜨물, leftover water after washing rice for cooking). The taste is typically savory and deep, with a rich umami taste from the fermented soybean paste. Naengguk are cold soups usually eaten in summer. These soups are usually fresh, clean and tangy, such as with oi-naengguk (오이냉국, cold cucumber) and miyeok-naengguk (미역냉국, cold wakame soup). Kkaet-guk (깻국, sesame soup), made with chicken and sesame seeds, is thicker and is made to replenish and supplement nutrients during hot weather. This tradition is practiced by Koreans to match their body temperature with the season, a cultural norm believed to produce many health benefits.

=== Malgeun jangguk ===
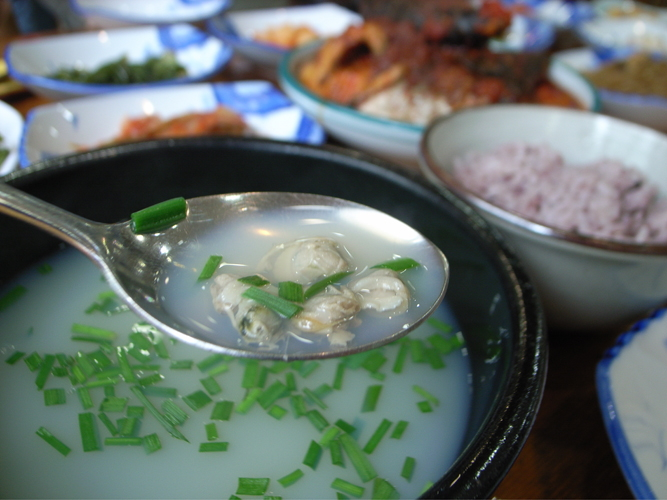
Jaecheopguk, small shellfish soup one of malgeun jangguk

- Tteokguk (떡국), tteok (rice cake) soup
- Miyeok-guk (미역국), wakame (edible seaweed) soup
- Kong-namul-guk (콩나물국), made with kongnamul
- Mu-guk (뭇국), made with radish
- Gamja-guk (감잣국), made with potato
- Toran-guk (토란국), made with taro
- Bugeo-guk (북엇국), made with dried Alaska pollock
- Bok-guk/bogeo-tang (복국/복어탕), made with puffer fish
- Jogae-guk (조갯국), made with shellfish
  - Jaecheop-guk (재첩국), soup made with jaecheop (small clams, Corbicula fluminea) harvested in rivers of Gyeongsang Province

=== Gomguk ===
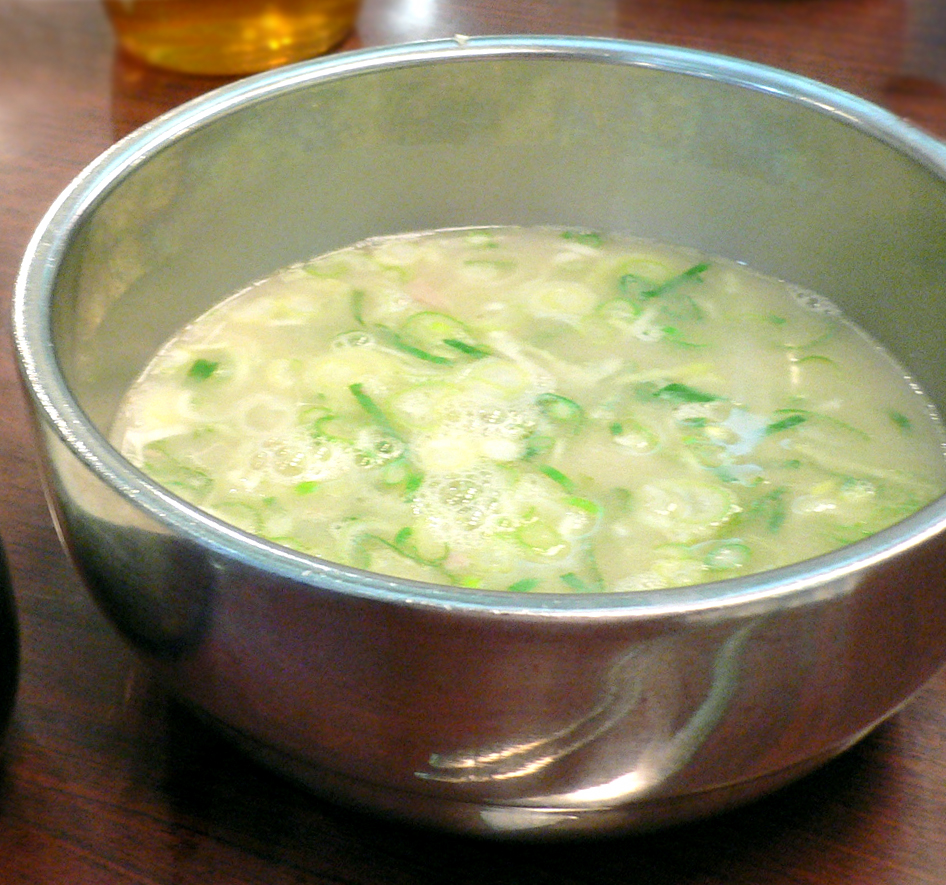
Seolleongtang, one of the types of gomguk

- Beef
  - Gomguk/gomtang (곰국/곰탕, Korean pronunciation: [koːmk͈uk, koːmtʰaŋ]):
    - Sagol gomtang (사골곰탕), pale-bone broths garnished with oxtail or sliced brisket
    - Kkori gomtang (꼬리곰탕), ox tail soup
  - Seolleongtang (설렁탕): ox leg bone soup simmered for more than 10 hours until the soup is milky-white. Usually served in a bowl containing somyeon and pieces of beef. Sliced scallions and black pepper are used as condiments
  - Galbi-tang (갈비탕), made with galbi or beef ribs
  - Yukgaejang (육개장), beef soup with red chili flakes, soy sauce and bean sprouts
  - Dogani-tang (도가니탕), soup from knuckles and bones
- Chicken and pork
  - Samgye-tang (삼계탕), a soup made with Cornish game hens that are stuffed with ginseng, a hedysarum, glutinous rice, jujubes, garlic, and chestnuts; the soup is traditionally eaten in the summer
  - Gamja-tang (감자탕, "potato stew"), a spicy soup made with pork spine, vegetables (especially potatoes), and hot peppers; the vertebrae are usually separated, and the dish is often served as a late night snack but may also be served for lunch or dinner
  - Dwaeji-gukbap (돼지국밥), a representative regional hearty pork-parts soup with rice of coastal Gyeongsang-do

=== Tojangguk ===
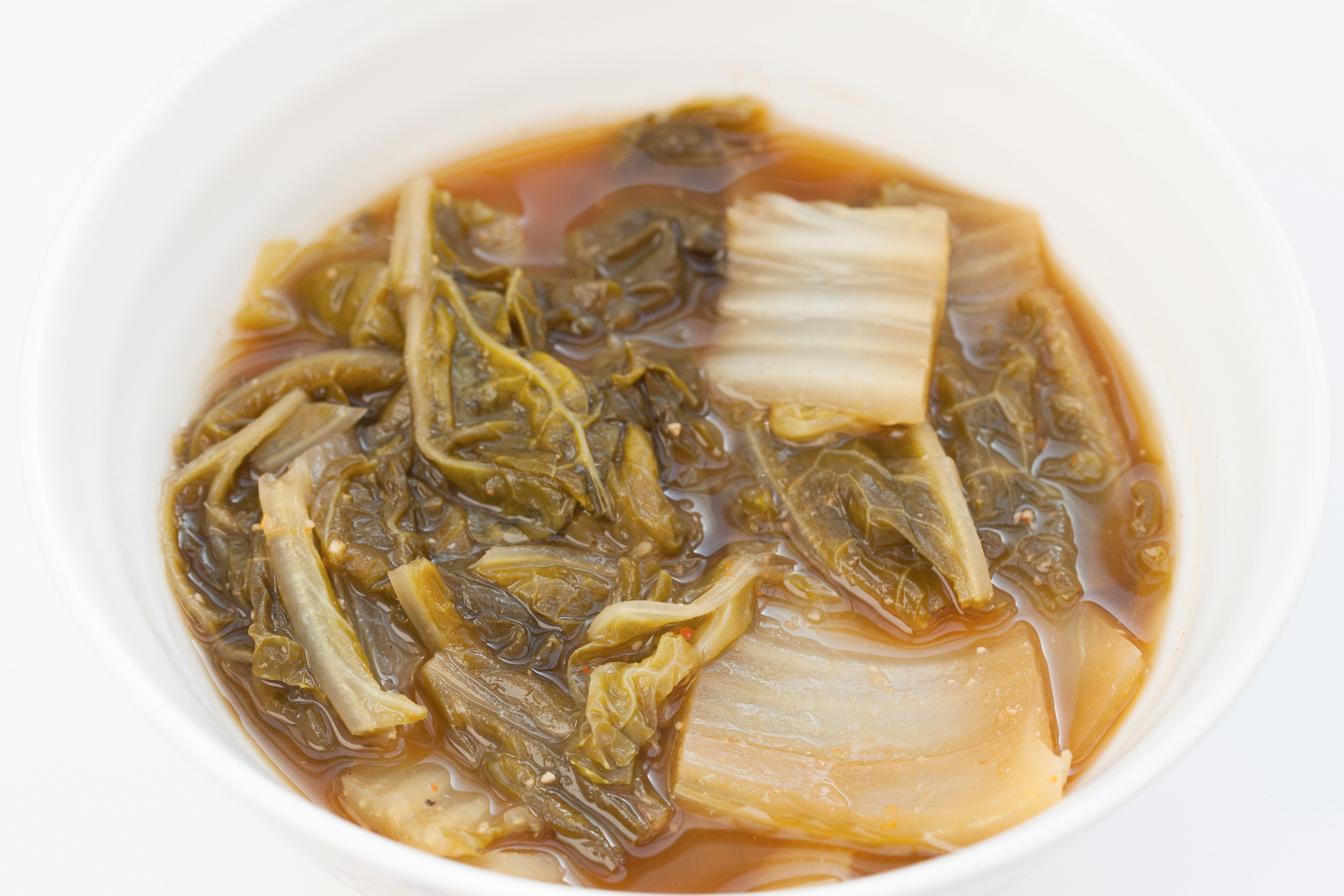
Ugeojiguk

Tojangguk are eaten all year round. The term emerged in the 1930s in Korean cookbooks.

- Sigeumchi tojangguk (시금치토장국), made with spinach
- Auk tojangguk (아욱토장국), made with malva
- Naengi tojangguk (냉이토장국), made with horseradish
- Ugeoji-guk (우거짓국), made with ugeoji (우거지, dried napa cabbage)
- Daseulgi-guk (다슬깃국), made with freshwater snails (다슬기, Semisulcospira libertina)

=== Naengguk ===
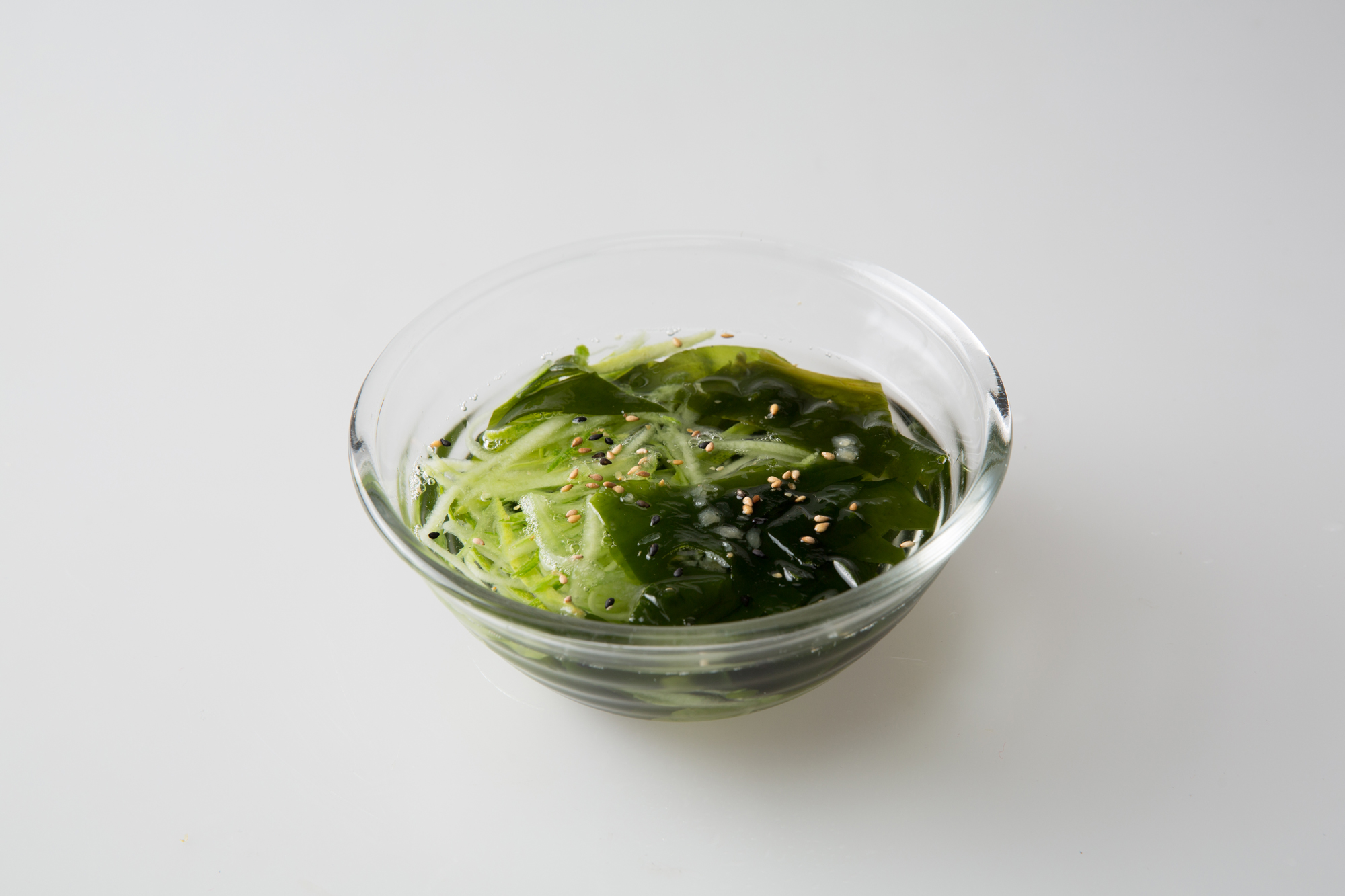
Cold cucumber wakame soup

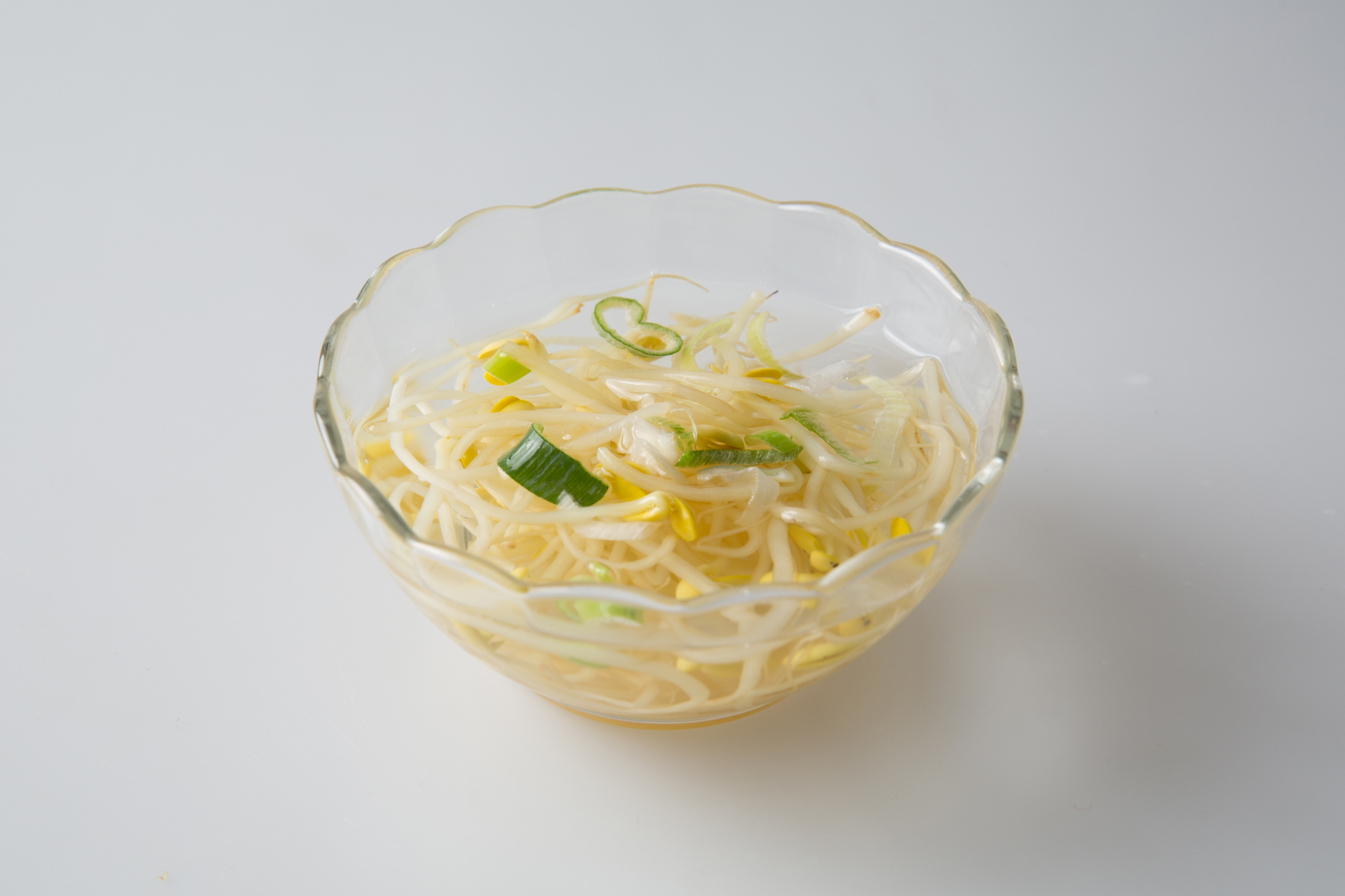
Cold soybean sprout soup

Naengguk refers to all kinds of cold soups, mainly eaten in summer. They are also called changuk (literally "cold soup") in pure Korean while the term naengguk is a combination of a Hanja word and a pure Korean word with the same meaning. The first historical record on naengguk appears in a poem written by Yi Gyu-bo (1168–1241), a high officer of the Goryeo period (918–1392). Naengguk is referred to as "sungaeng" in the poem, which literally means sunchaeguk, soup made with sunchae (Brasenia schreberi). Yi praised its clear and plain taste.

Naengguk is generally divided into two categories according to taste and ingredients. One group of naengguk is made by mixing chilled water and vinegar to give a sweet and sour taste; examples include miyeok naengguk made with wakame, oi naengguk made with cucumber, pa naengguk made with spring onions, nameul naengguk made with garlic, and gim naengguk made with gim or nori. The other group is made to supplement health and has rich tastes, such as chilled soup made with chicken, sesame, or soy bean.

- Miyeok-naengguk (미역냉국), cold wakame soup
- Oi-naengguk (오이냉국), cold cucumber soup
- Kkaet-guk (깻국), hearty cold soup made with chicken and ground sesame seeds
- Naeng-kong-guk (냉콩국), made with ground soybeans and can be used for kong-guksu
- Kong-namul-naengguk (콩나물냉국), made with kongnamul

== Ingredients ==
- Maeun-tang (매운탕): a refreshing, hot and spicy fish soup.
- Haejang-guk (해장국): a favorite hangover cure consisting usually of meaty pork spine, ugeoji (우거지 dried napa cabbage) coagulated ox blood (선지, similar to blood pudding), and vegetables in a hearty beef broth; legend has it that soon after World War II, the restaurant that invented this stew was the only place open in the Jongno district when the curfew at the time lifted at 4:00 AM
- Haemul-tang (해물탕): made with various seafood
- Haemul japtang (해물잡탕), made with seafood and beef offal, once part of the Korean royal court cuisine
- Altang (알탕): can be made with myeongran jeot (명란젓), salted and fermented Alaska pollack's roe seasoned with chili pepper or fresh roe
- Chueo-tang (추어탕): made with Misgurnus mizolepis
- Yongbong-tang (용봉탕): made with chicken, carp and softshell turtle
- Mandu-guk (만둣국): mandu soup
- Wanja-tang (완자탕): made with wanja (meatball-like jeon)
- Gyeran-tang (계란탕): soup made with eggs
- Ssukkuk (쑥국): made with ssuk (Artemisia indica)
- Sundae-guk (순댓국): made with Sundae (or pork blood sausage) and sometimes it includes fatty pieces of intestine (gopchang), liver, lungs, bits of cartilage, and meat.

== Gukbap ==
Gukbap (국밥, Korean pronunciation: [kukp͈ap]) are dishes developed from guk. The term literally means "soup with rice." The dish is typically served in restaurants, and has become popular among the working class since the late Joseon Dynasty. It is meant to be a simple but hearty dish that keeps you full and satisfied with essential nutrients from the soup and rice combination.

- Kong-namul-gukbap (콩나물국밥), clear soybean sprout (kongnamul) soup with rice
- Gul-gukbap (굴국밥) – oyster and rice soup.
- Ttaro gukbap (따로국밥), a variety of yukgaejang, local specialty of Daegu

== See also ==
- Jeongol
- Jjigae
- List of soups
