= Seonjit-guk =

Korean blood stew

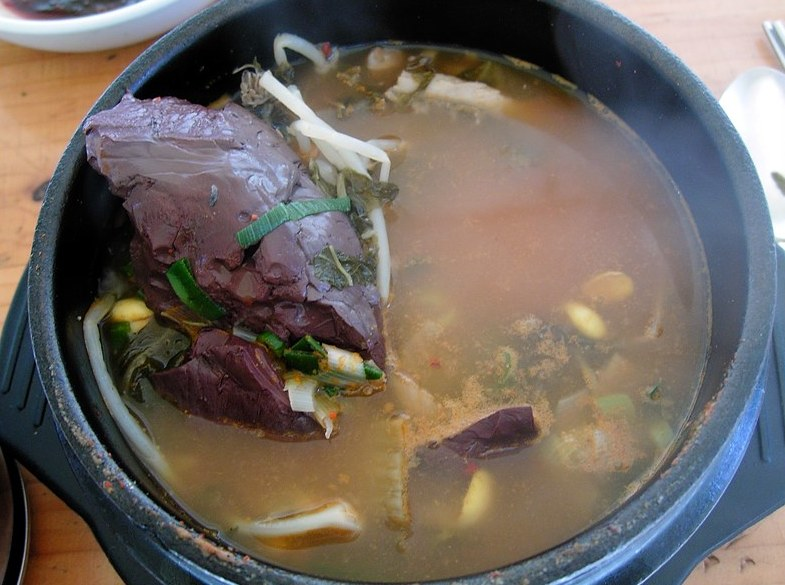
- Alternative names: Seonji-guk
- Type: Guk (Korean soup)
- Region or state: Korea
- Main ingredients: Coagulated ox blood, beef broth, vegetables

Seonjit-guk (Korean: 선짓국) is a traditional Korean soup (guk) made with coagulated cow blood called seonji (선지). It is a popular hangover soup (haejang-guk). Bone broth, tripe (cow stomach), and napa cabbage are common ingredients. It is rich in iron, protein, and cholesterol.

== History ==
It is unclear when seonji began to be used in foods, but references to it span hundreds of years.

In late 19th century, Korea saw an increase in meat consumption, producing an influx of meat byproducts like intestines and blood. As a result, seonjit-guk, then known as uhyeoltang (우혈탕; 牛血湯), became an affordable commoner's dish. Seonji was also used as a cheaper alternative for cow bones.

The stew was further popularized as the recipe was featured in the popular 1924 cookbook Chosŏn mussang sinsik yori chepŏp (조선무쌍신식요리제법; 朝鮮無雙新式料理製法), and the daily newspaper The Dong-A Ilbo. In the 1930s, the first restaurants dedicated to the stew were established in Seoul and Incheon.

== See also ==
- Korean cuisine
