= Oyster stew =

Stew made with oyster

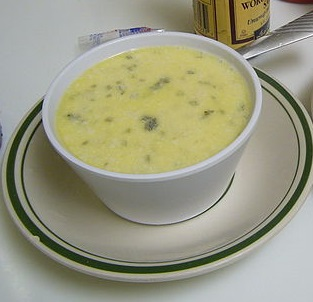
- Type: Stew
- Place of origin: United States; The Gambia
- Main ingredients: Oysters, cream, sometimes mushrooms or chives

Oyster stew is a stew made with oysters. It is popular in the United States and in The Gambia.

In New England cuisine, oyster stew is often associated with Thanksgiving. In Southern United States cuisine, oyster stew is often prepared on Christmas Eve.

There have been a number of different explanations offered for oyster stew being traditionally consumed on Christmas Eve. Bill Neal suggests that before the acceptance of refrigerated food transport, sufficient cold weather for shipping was not guaranteed before December, and so "Far from the coast, oysters became a symbol of the arrival of the winter holiday season, appearing in the markets by Christmas Eve and on tables that night as oyster stew. Stephanie Butler, however, gives an alternate explanation: Irish Catholic immigrants would not eat meat on Christmas Eve, and were used to eating stew made with ling instead. Butler suggests that "oysters taste pretty similar to dried ling: they're salty, briny and can be quite chewy. The ling stew recipe was quickly adapted for oysters."

The basic southern oyster stew is made with milk and cream. Oyster stew is often served with oyster crackers, and that may be the origin of the cracker's name.

Oyster stew is also a popular dish in Gambian cuisine. Oysters in The Gambia are grown on mangrove roots in swamps.

== See also ==
- Clam chowder
- Cream of mushroom soup
- Gulgukbap, Korean oyster soup
- List of Christmas dishes
- List of stews
