= Gul-gukbap =

Korean oyster and rice soup

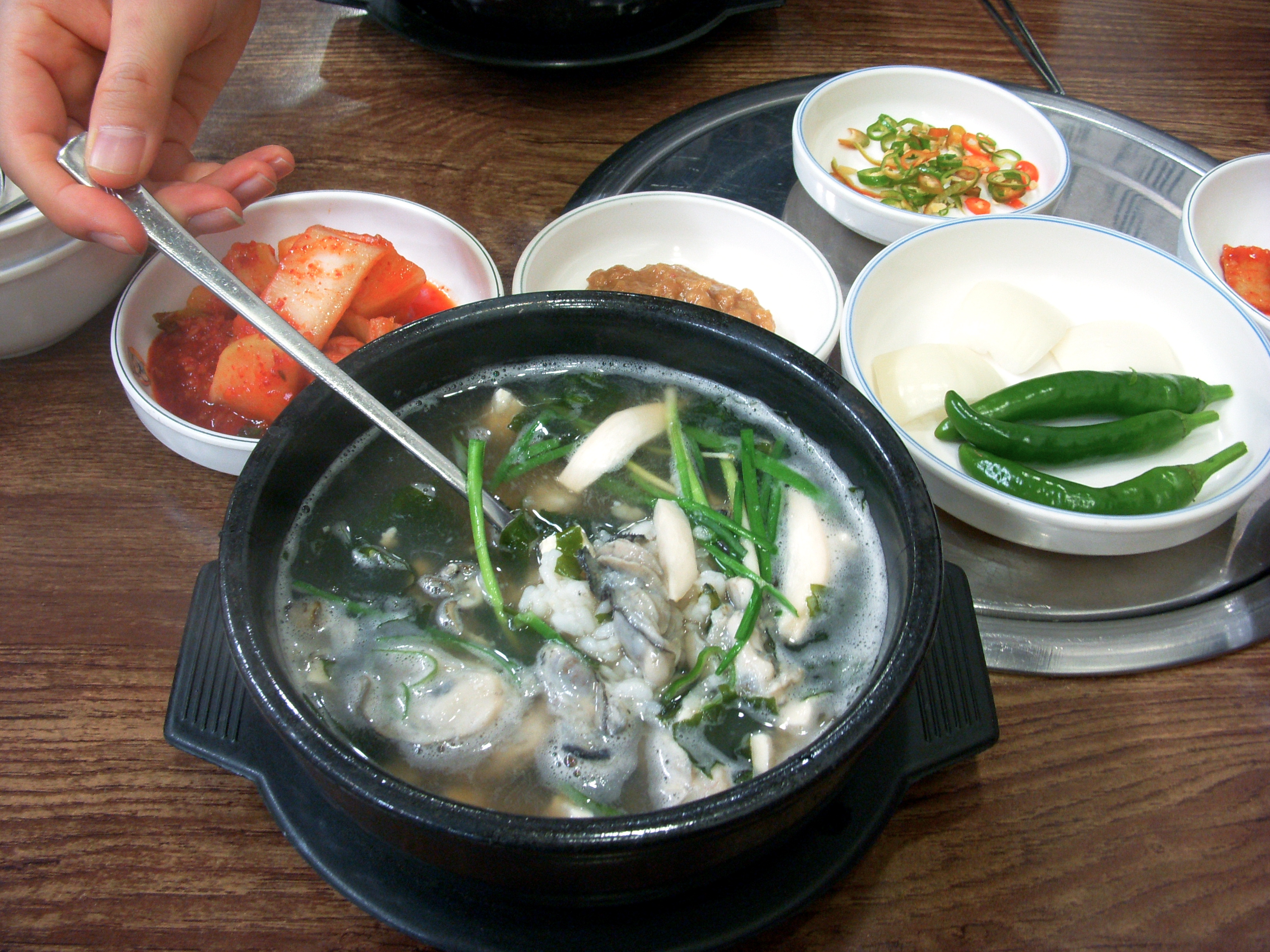
- Gul-gukbap served in ttukbaegi (earthenware)
- Type: Gukbap
- Place of origin: Korea
- Associated cuisine: Korean cuisine
- Main ingredients: Oysters
- Food energy (per 1 serving): 439 kcal (1,840 kJ)

Korean name
- Hangul: 굴국밥
- RR: gulgukbap
- MR: kulgukpap
- IPA: [kul.ɡuk̚.p͈ap̚]

Gul-gukbap (Korean: 굴국밥) or oyster and rice soup is a type of gukbap (rice soup) made with oysters.

== Preparation ==
Shucked oysters along with garlic and tofu are added to anchovy stock that has been boiling with radish and salted shrimps. Scallions and enoki mushrooms are then added, followed by bap (cooked rice) and garlic chives.

== See also ==
- Haejangguk
- Oyster stew
