= Gamja-tang =

Korean pork-based soup

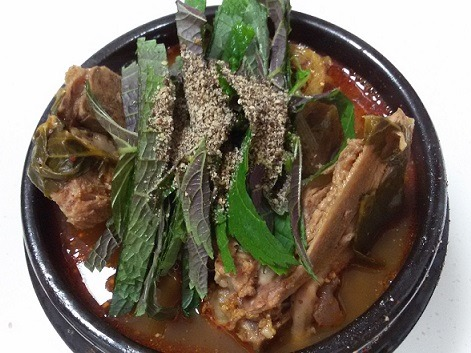
- Alternative names: Pork back-bone stew
- Type: Tang
- Place of origin: Korea
- Main ingredients: Pork backbone
- Ingredients generally used: Potatoes, deulkkae, scallions, garlic

Korean name
- Hangul: 감자탕
- Hanja: 감자湯
- RR: gamjatang
- MR: kamjat'ang
- IPA: kam.dʑa.tʰaŋ

Gamja-tang (Korean: 감자탕; [kam.dʑa.tʰaŋ]) or pork back-bone stew is a spicy Korean soup made from the spine or neck bones of a pig. It often contains potatoes, cellophane noodles, greens, perilla leaves, green onions, hot peppers and ground perilla seeds.

The vertebrae are usually separated with bits of meat clinging to them. The vertebrae are boiled at high temperatures to soften the meat. To remove the meat, one must use an instrument such as a chopstick. The meal is usually served with kimchi and a bowl of rice. This food is served as a lunch or dinner and often as a late-night snack, as well.

The soup base is a deep red colour from the red hot peppers.

The soup is now common in Korean restaurants outside Korea, including the United States and Canada.

== History ==
Gamja-tang originated in Jeolla Province in southern Korea. The main industry of Jeolla was agriculture, and hogs were widely raised and used for food. The origins of gamjatang can be traced back to the Three Kingdoms era when South Jeolla farmers raised hogs in greater numbers than in most of the rest of Korea. It is said that Go Yujeong is the creator of gamjatang, but there is no reference about this claim.

Since cattle were the backbone of farming then, used both for their manure and plowing, cattle were much more valuable than hogs. Slaughtering hogs for feasts and special occasions was much more common than slaughtering beef, which helps explain the dish's pork origins.

When Incheon harbor opened, many people migrated to Seoul and its surrounding area from Jeolla Province, as well as from other parts of the country. When construction of the Gyung-ui Railway began in 1899, laborers started working around Incheon, and gamjatang become popular among them because it is cheap and nutritious, and its high fat content provided the calories they needed. As time passed, gamjatang became one of the iconic foods of Incheon.

There is a theory that the name "gamja-tang" originated from the fact that the spinal cord in the backbone of the pig is called "gamja," and there is a part called gamja-bone when the spine of the pig is divided into parts, and it is called "gamja-tang" because it was boiled.

== See also ==
- Seolleongtang
- Haejangguk
- Tonkotsu
