= Naengguk =

Korean cold soup

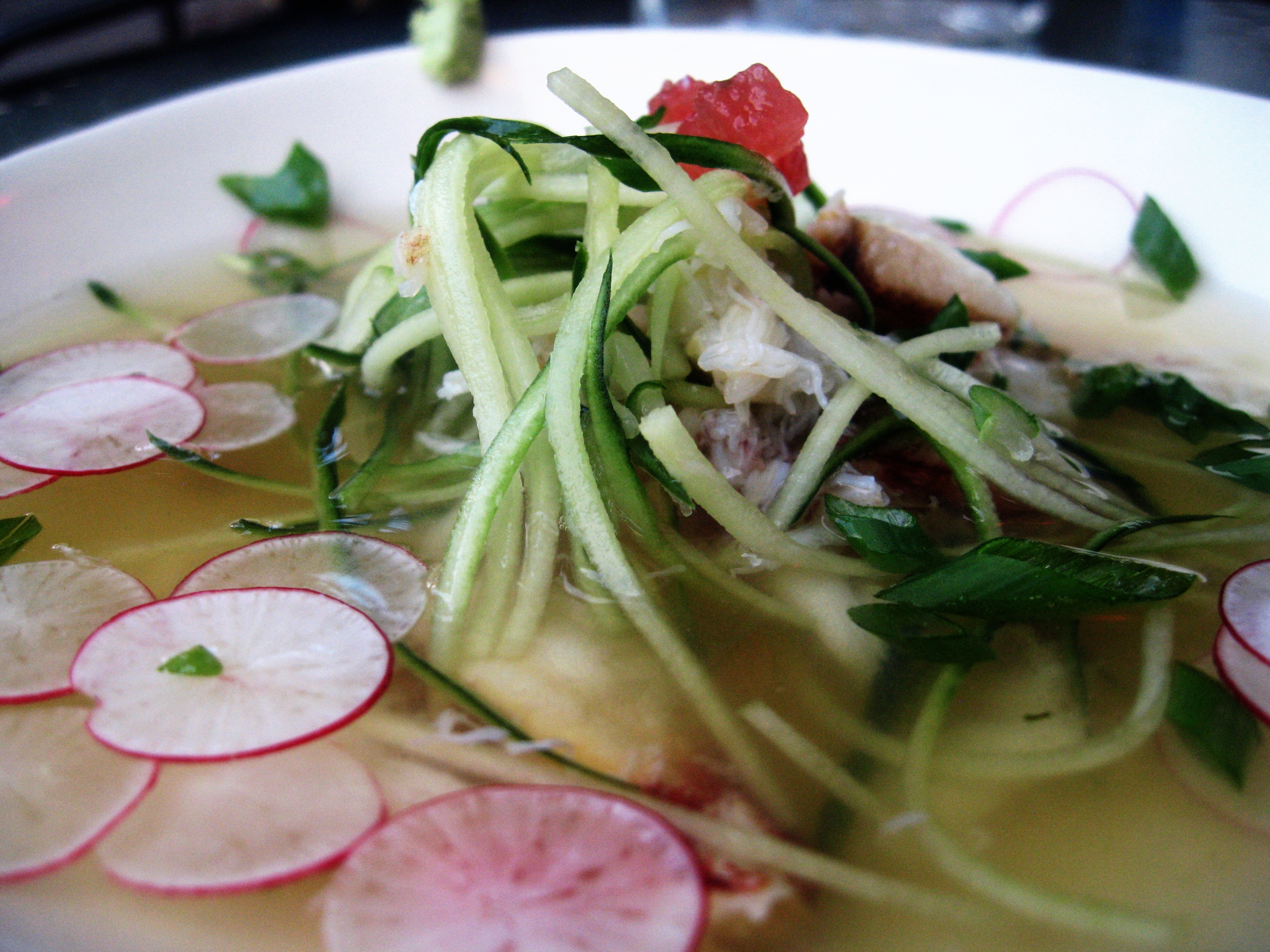
- A bowl of elaborated oi-naengguk (chilled cucumber soup)
- Alternative names: Chilled soup
- Type: Guk
- Place of origin: Korea
- Serving temperature: Cold

Korean name
- Hangul: 냉국
- Hanja: 冷국
- RR: naengguk
- MR: naengkuk
- IPA: [nɛŋ.k͈uk̚]

Naengguk (Korean: 냉국) or chilled soup refers to all kinds of cold guk (국, soups) in Korean cuisine, mainly eaten in summer. It is also called chan'guk (찬국), which literally means "cold soup" in pure Korean, while the term naengguk is a combination of a hanja word (冷, "cold") and a pure Korean word (국, "soup").

The first historical record on naengguk appears in a poem written by Yi Kyu-bo (1168–1241), a high officer of the Goryeo period (918–1392). In the poem, naengguk is referred to as sungaeng (순갱), which literally means sunchaeguk (순채국), i.e., soup made with sunchae (Brasenia schreberi). Yi praised its clear and plain taste, saying it made usual dishes seem vulgar.

Naengguk is largely divided into two categories according to seasoning and ingredients. The first category is made by mixing chilled water and vinegar to give a sour and sweet taste, such as miyeok naengguk (미역냉국) made with wakame, oi naengguk (오이냉국) made with cucumber, pa naengguk (파냉국) made with spring onions, maneul naengguk (마늘냉국) made with garlic, and gim naengguk (김냉국) made with gim or nori. The other category is made to supplement health and has rich tastes such as chilled soup made with chicken, sesame, or soybeans.

== See also ==
- Jjigae
- Jeongol
- List of Korean dishes
- List of soups
