= Cheongjin-dong =

Coordinates: 37.571°N 126.980°E

- Interactive map of Cheongjin-dong
- Country: South Korea

Area
  - Total: 0.06 km^{2} (0.023 sq mi)

Korean name
- Hangul: 청진동
- Hanja: 淸進洞
- RR: Cheongjin-dong
- MR: Ch'ŏngjin-dong

Cheongjin-dong (Korean: 청진동) is a dong (neighborhood) of Jongno District, Seoul, South Korea. It is a legal dong (법정동 法定洞) administered under its administrative dong (행정동 行政洞), Jongno.

== Attraction ==
- Haejangguk street

== See also ==
- Administrative divisions of South Korea
