= Dwaeji-gukbap =

South Korean pork soup dish

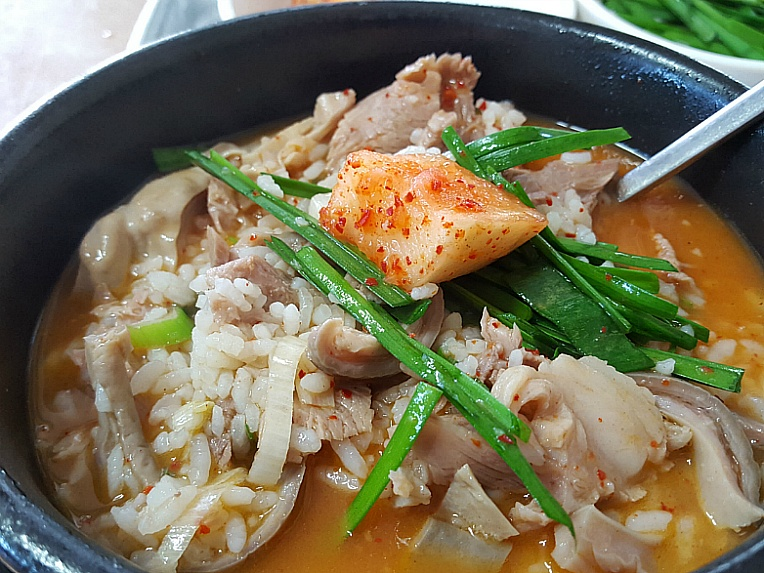
- Dwaeji-gukbap (pork and rice soup)
- Place of origin: South Korea
- Region or state: Busan
- Serving temperature: Hot

Korean name
- Hangul: 돼지국밥
- RR: dwaejigukbap
- MR: twaejigukpap

Dwaeji-gukbap (Korean: 돼지국밥) is a South Korean soup especially popular in Busan made with pork, soy sauce, miso, rice wine, sesame oil, and bone broth. The name literally translates to "pork, soup, rice". It is served with various side dishes like rice, salted shrimp, onion, noodle, kimchi, garlic, and green peppers, which all can be added to the soup. It originated during the Korean War in the 1950s as poverty food. It eventually grew in popularity. The dish spread from Busan to the rest of the Gyeongsang province and eventually the rest of the country. However, the dish is not well-recognized outside of Korea. Busan has a street named after the dish, where there are dozens of restaurants that serve dwaeji-gukbap. These days it is often eaten while drinking liquor. It is also thought to be beneficial for women recovering from childbirth. The soup is enjoyed all year round (but particularly in winter) and at any time of the day. Many establishments that serve the dish are open from morning to night, with some even open 24 hours.

== History ==
Historically, the people of Busan made clear soup from meat, and they would commonly add rice to the broth. The oldest existing dwaeji-gukbap restaurant was established in 1938. dwaeji-gukbap became widely popular during the 1950s when North Korean refugees fled south during the Korean War. The refugees were unable to afford meat, so they used pork bones discarded by the U.S. military. They may have also used beef. Initially, the dish was simply broth, rice, and meat slices in a single bowl. Over time, the dish was influenced by other regions, as people who arrived from other parts of the country settled in Busan. The salted shrimp that often accompanies the dish originated from the north, whereas the chive salad and spicy seasoning originated in Busan.

== Preparation ==
The preparation of the soup is labor intensive, requiring lots of time to make. First, pork bones are boiled in water for hours, resulting in a milky white broth. However, three versions of broth exist overall: cloudy, translucent, and clear. Cloudy broth is made from boiling pork bones, translucent broth is made from boiling the pig's head and intestines, and clear broth is made from boiling only the meat. Different cuts of meat are then added to the pot before serving. It is served various with sauces, garnishes, and side dishes. Variations exist in the exact preparation. It can be served with rice either already in the soup or on the side, and it can also be served with noodles. Other accompaniments like green onions, fermented shrimp, red pepper paste, white onions, garlic, and different types of kimchi, can also be added.

== Health benefits ==
It is thought that the soup is beneficial for women in the postpartum period. Also, it is consumed during times of illness and hangovers. The dish may help health conditions due to its high amount of nutrients like calcium and protein.
