= Ttukbaegi =

Korean earthenware for the stove and table

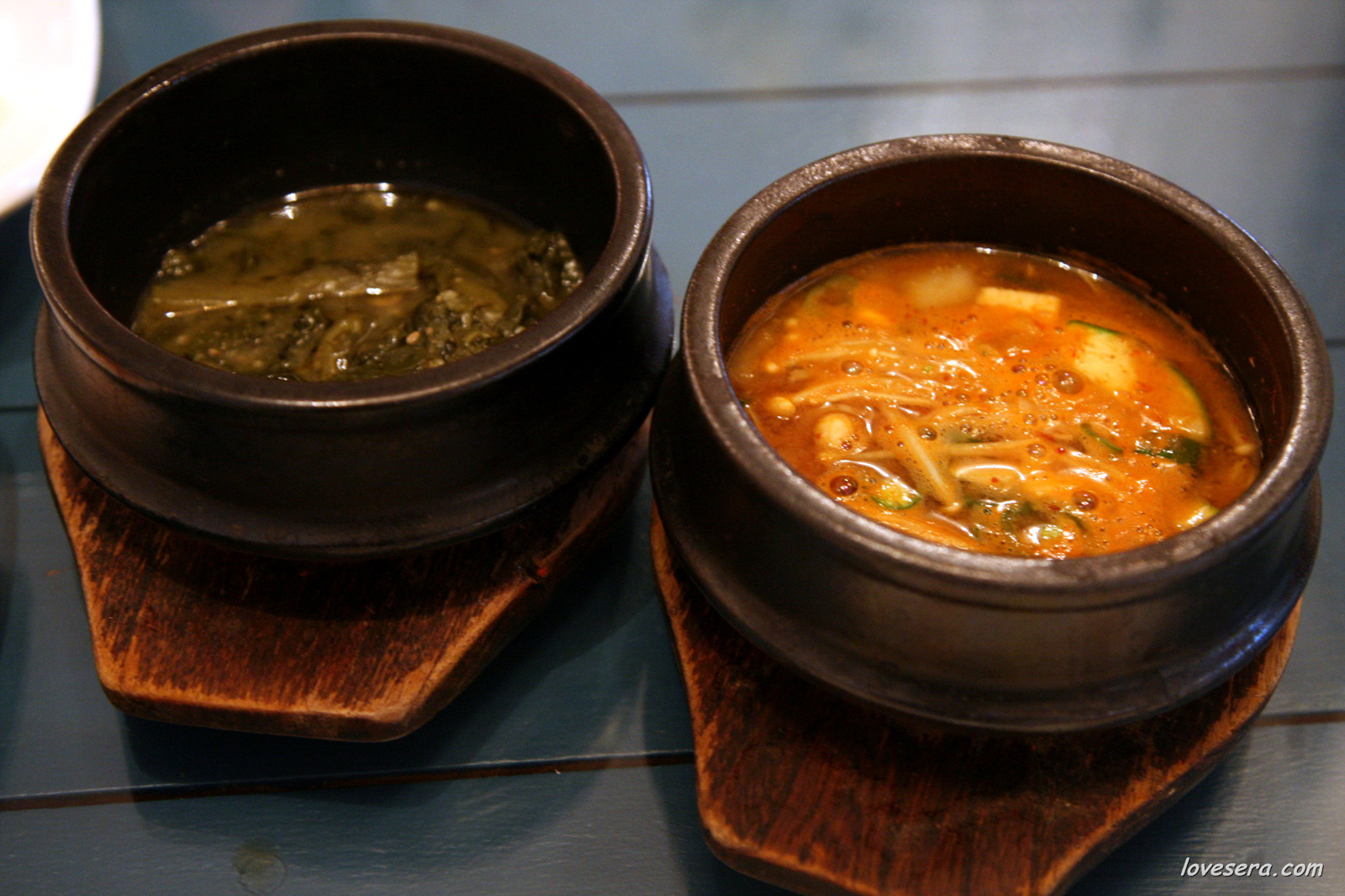
- Two jjigae (stew) served in ttukbaegi

Korean name
- Hangul: 뚝배기
- RR: ttukbaegi
- MR: ttukpaegi
- IPA: [t͈uk̚.p͈ɛ.ɡi]

A ttukbaegi (Korean: 뚝배기) is a type of oji-gureut, which is an onggi coated with brown-tone ash glaze. The small, black to brown earthenware vessel is a cookware/serveware used for various jjigae (stew), gukbap (soup with rice), or other boiled dishes in Korean cuisine. As a ttukbaegi retains heat and does not cool off as soon as removed from the stove, stews and soups in ttukbaegi usually arrive at the table at a bubbling boil.

== History ==
The ttukbaegi dates from the Goryeo Dynasty and has been widely used from the Joseon Dynasty up to the present day. In the Goryeo-period poem of Lee Dal-chung (이달충), the phrase "White makgeolli is brought to the ttukbaegi" indicates the existence and common use of ttukbaegi. Considering that Lee Dal-chung was a figure of the Goryeo Dynasty, it can be confirmed that ttukbaegi was already made and used during the Goryeo Dynasty.

=== Ttukbaegi of Jeju ===
Ttukbaegi was not commercialized in Jeju's food culture for long. Although it has been confirmed that it has been actively used since the Goryeo Dynasty and the Joseon Dynasty, in fact, ttukbaegi is not found in Jeju Onggi because it was not necessary to cook food using foreign earthenware in Jeju. It may have been used in some government offices and kitchens where people from outside the country came and went, but it may not have been common because it was common to use organic or white porcelain bowls without using earthenware. According to the testimonies of high-age residents who are over 90 years old in Jeju, it has been seen from time to time since liberation, but it has only been generalized for about two to 30 years. The fact that Jeju's traditional food does not have soup or stew-like food to use earthen pot also proves that Jeju Island did not traditionally use earthen pot.

== Types ==
The ttukbaegi can be classified according to the production process and usage.

=== Classification according to production process ===
- Oji ttukbaegi (오지 뚝배기): The oji of the oji bowl refers to the bowl of '오자기'(烏 瓷 器) which is of a solid black color. The pottery is heated with lye, which is a natural glaze, is already found in the Gaya period and early Silla period.
- Jil ttukbaegi (질 뚝배기): The jil ttukbaegi is not coated with lye. This ttukbaegi can be considered to be almost the same as the ancient earthenware.

=== Classification by purpose ===
- Heat Resistant Earthenware(내열 뚝배기): Heat Resistant Earthenware is a heat-resistant earthenware that is baked at a high temperature of 1,200 °C. Heat-resistant earthen pot is suitable for boiling food such as soybean paste stew or gyeran-jjim.
- Normal earthen pot(일반 뚝배기): A regular earthen pot is an earthen pot that is baked at a low temperature of 800 °C and has a weak heat resistance properties. The combination of soil, which is an ingredient, is also different from heat-resistant earthen pot. Regular ttukbaegi is suitable for foods such as seolleongtang or gukbap.

== Idioms ==
As ttukbaegi is considered crude pottery, people use the proverb "Soybean paste stew tastes better than a ttukbaegi looks. (Ddukbaegiboda jangmas-i jota; 뚝배기보다 장맛이 좋다.)" to say that you shouldn't prejudge the content by the humble outward appearance.

"In the ttukbaegi, the sauce is bound to boil" (뚝배기에는 장을 끓이기 마련이다) means that anything can only be used for its own use.

"The sound of breaking ttukbaegi" (뚝배기 깨지는 소리) means that refer to a poor and murky voice or figuratively refers to a poor singer or speaker.

"Will the wooden ttukbaegi be iron?" (나무 뚝배기가 쇠 양푼 될까?) is a word that implies that a bad person cannot turn into a good person.

"I broke the ttukbaegi and spilled the soup" (뚝배기 깨고 국 쏟았다) is an analogy to mean that one mistake will result in a loss many times. In the same expression, there is an idiom, someone break dok and pour their guts out.

== Gallery ==
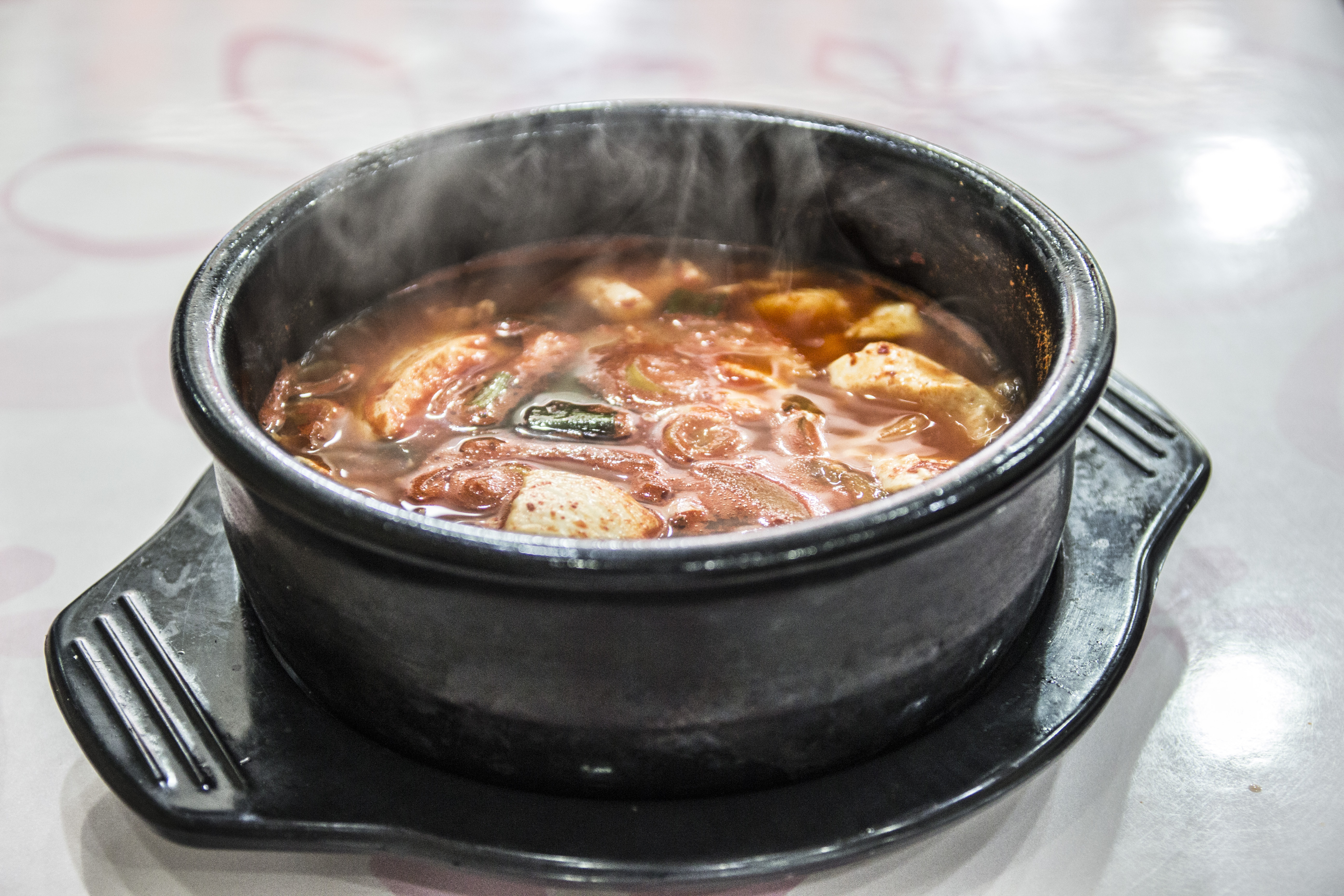
Sundubu-jjigae served in ttukbaegi

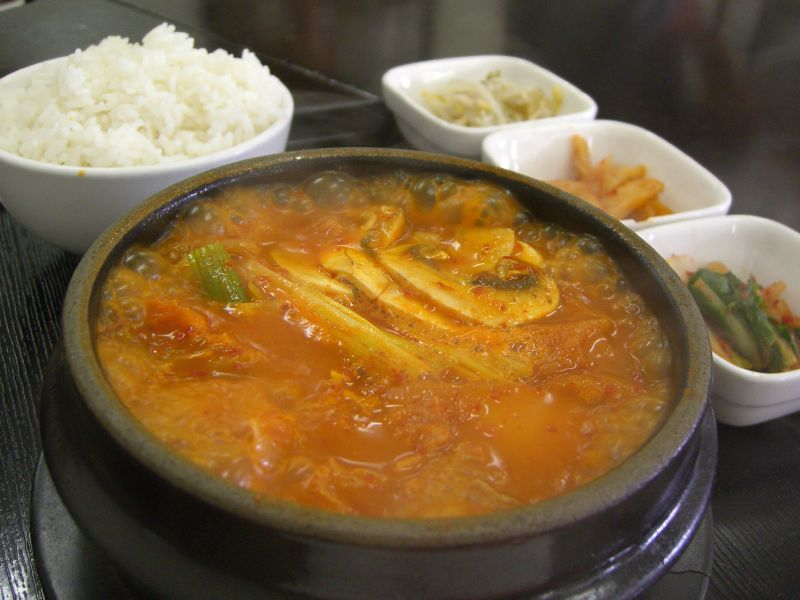
Kimchi-jjigae still boiling in ttukbaegi

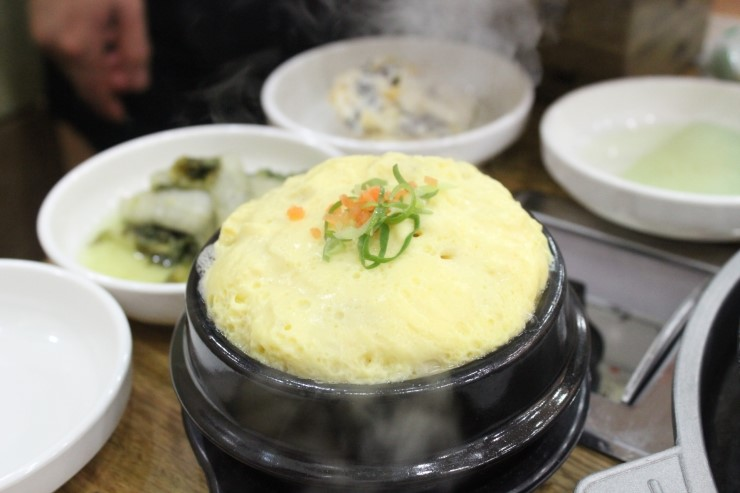
Gyeran-jjim boiled and fluffed in ttukbaegi

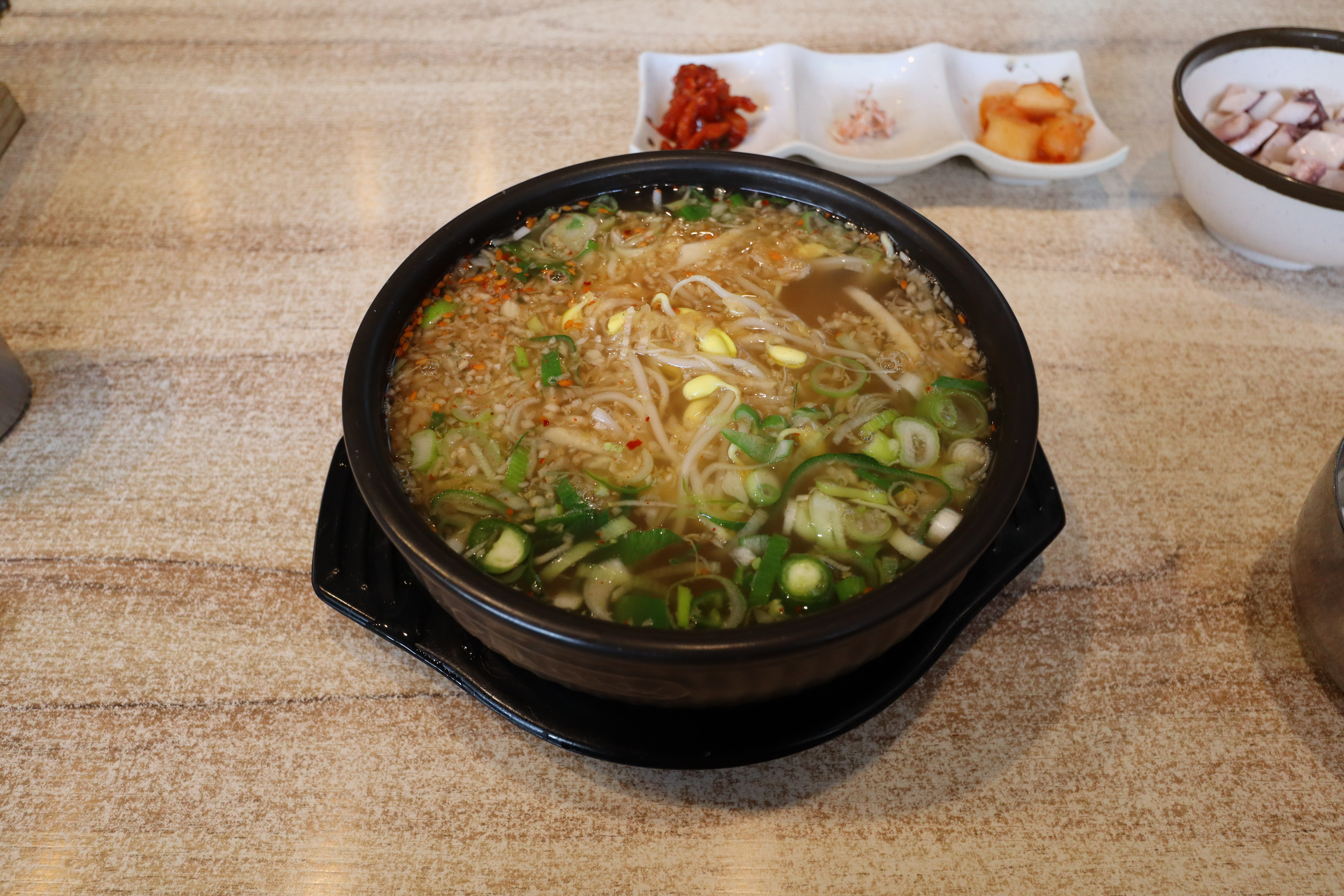
Kongnamul Gukbap served in ttukbaegi

== See also ==
- Dolsot
- Claypot cooking
- Korean pottery and porcelain
- List of cooking vessels
