= Jumak =

Traditional Korean taverns or inns

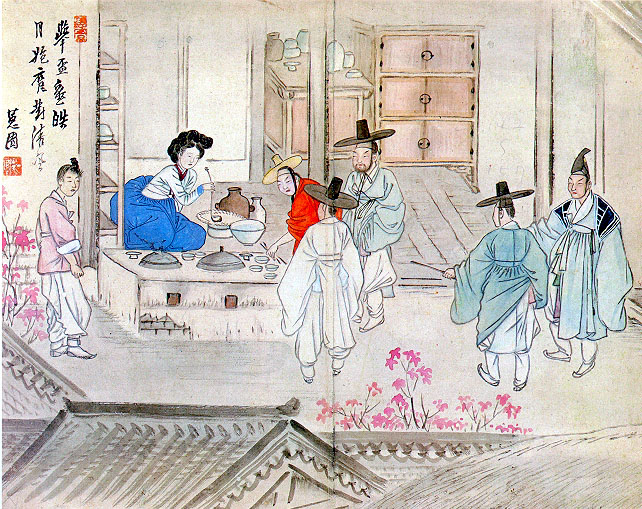
- In Shin Yun-bok's genre painting titled Jusa geobae ("Holding a drinking party"), a jumak is depicted.

Korean name
- Hangul: 주막
- Hanja: 酒幕
- RR: jumak
- MR: chumak

Jumak (Korean: 주막, lit. "wine house") were traditional Korean taverns or inns that provided alcohol, food, and lodgings to travellers. They are also called juju (酒肆), juga (酒家), or jupo (酒舖). Jumak were abundant during the Joseon Dynasty and could be found in both rural and urban areas. Jumak came in many varieties with some having stables for livestock, courtyards, and gardens.

One early mention of a jumak was one called Cheongwan (天官) that was owned by a kisaeng (female entertainer).

The 1485 text Kyŏngguk taejŏn provided rules and regulations concerning the establishments.

== Historical accounts ==
An early source could potentially attest to jumak in 1097 during King Sukjong's reign in the Goryeo period.

According to the text Samguk yusa, a general of Silla, Kim Yu-sin, frequented the establishment when he was young.

The Namhaeng Ilgi (남행일기), or "Diary of a Journey to the South", details jumak encounters by Kim Sŏngil.

== In fiction ==
The classic novel Hong Gildong jeon mentions jumak as places where the hero, Hong Gildong, would hide and gather information during his adventures.

== See also ==
- Ryokan, a Japanese analogue to jumak
