= Hur Young-in =

South Korean businessman

Hur Young-in (born 1949) is a South Korean entrepreneur and chairman of SPC Group, which owns brands such as SPC Samlip, Paris Croissant, Paris Baguette, Baskin-Robbins and Dunkin' Donuts operations in South Korea.

== Early life and education ==
Hur Young-in was born on May 17, 1949, in Hwanghae Province, as the second son of Hur Chang-sung, the honorary chairman of Samlip Food. Hur Young-in is Chairman of SPC Group that operates subsidiaries including Paris Croissant, BR Korea and SPC Samlip. Desiring to learn advanced baking and patisserie skills and know-how, he went to the United States in 1981 to study pastry and baking.

After returning to Korea, Chairman Hur Young-in opened in 1986 a European style bakery store in Seoul named 'Paris Croissant' to introduce freshly baked bread at the store, and expanded business in 1988 by launching franchise stores under the brand name 'Paris Baguette'. Having developed the domestic market-focused bakery business into an internationally recognized franchise business with advanced skills, know-how and brand, the company expanded the business to overseas markets. Paris Baguette now operates stores in 7 countries, including the United States, the world's largest market, and China, Singapore, Indonesia, Vietnam, Cambodia, as well as France, the top country in bakery and the home of baguettes.

== Career ==
Upon successfully growing his franchise business in South Korea and abroad, Hur founded the parent company, SPC Group in 2004, and relocated his subsidiaries, Paris Croissant, Samlip Food Corporation (now renamed SPC Samlip), and BR Korea. BR Korea is a joint venture for Baskin Robbins and Dunkin' Donuts operations in Korea.

For his contribution of spreading bread as a staple in South Korea, he received the Ordre National du Merite l'Officier and the Merite Agricole Chevalier from the French government in 2010 and 2012 respectively.

== In popular culture ==
The 2010 Korea Broadcasting System television drama Bread, Love and Dreams is based on Hur's experience as a child overcoming hardships to make quality bread and grow his business.
