= Leesungdang =

Oldest bakery in South Korea

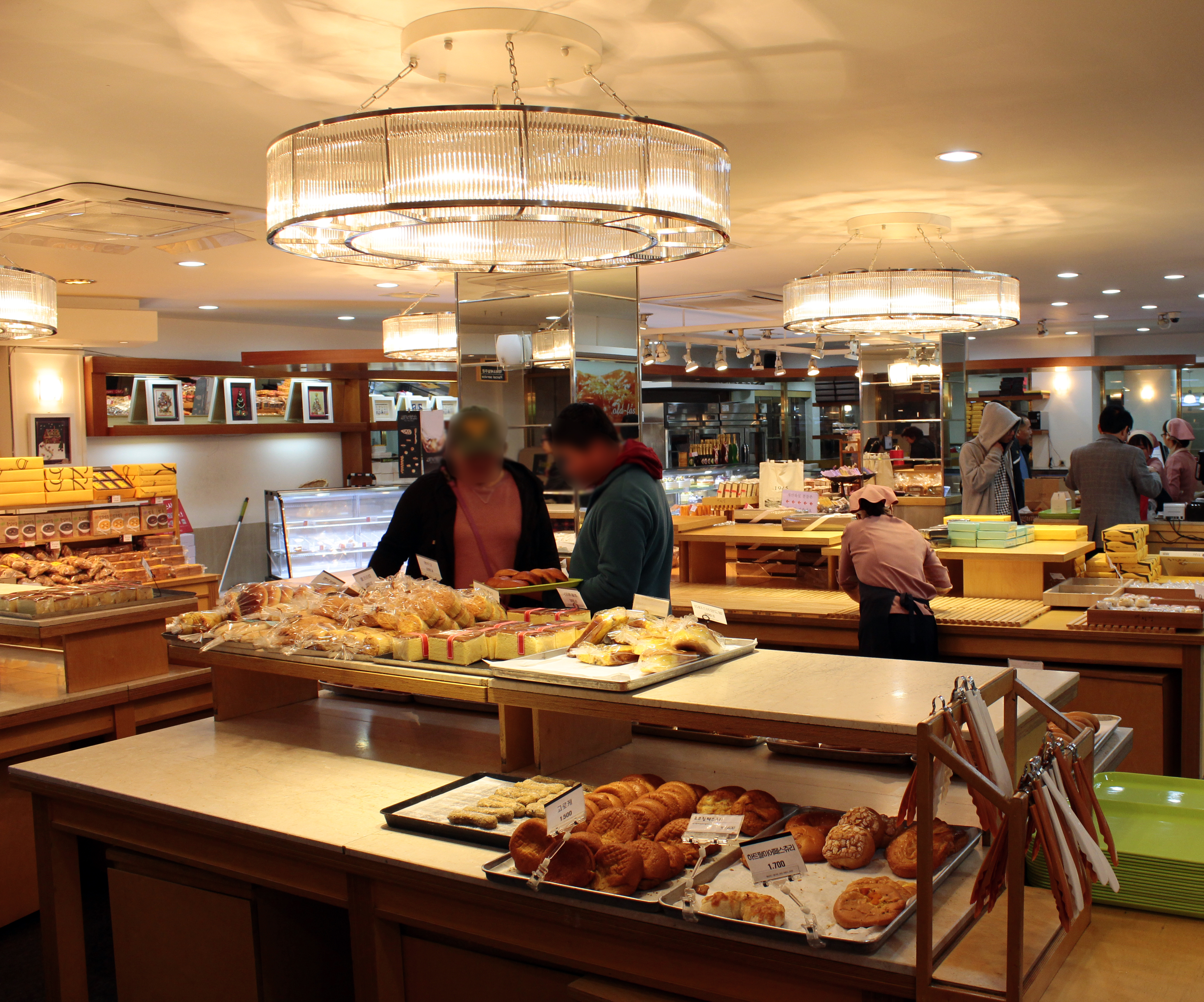
- Inside the main location in Gunsan (2018)

Restaurant information
- Established: 1945
- Food type: Bakery
- Coordinates: 35.9871°N 126.7112°E
- Website: leesungdang1945.com

Leesungdang (Korean: 이성당; Hanja: 李盛堂) is a historic bakery in Gunsan, North Jeolla Province, South Korea. It is the oldest active bakery in South Korea, having been founded in 1945, just after the liberation of Korea. It has remained a family business since then, and by 2019 was operated by the daughter-in-law of the founder.

As of 2024, the bakery operates several branch locations, including four in Seoul (one under the name Haetssalmaru), one in Yongin, and one in Hwaseong.

The bakery is reportedly known for its anpan (Korean: 단팥빵; RR: danpatppang) and vegetable bread.

== History ==
A Japanese predecessor to the bakery first opened in the 1920s, during the colonial period. After Korea's liberation in 1945, the bakery's Korean employees took over the restaurant and renamed it Leesungdang. The business experienced a rough period in the 1990s, when traffic in the area decreased. The chain eventually managed to expand by the 2010s, after it achieved popularity through word of mouth. The restaurant also operates a branch store in Seoul under a different name: Haetssalmaru (햇쌀마루). This branch is operated by the family's third generation. In April 2020, it opened a branch in the Lotte Department Store, Gimpo Airport branch.

== See also ==
- Taegeukdang – oldest bakery in Seoul
- Sungsimdang – historic bakery in Daegu
- List of oldest restaurants in South Korea
