= Taegeukdang =

Historic bakery in Seoul, South Korea

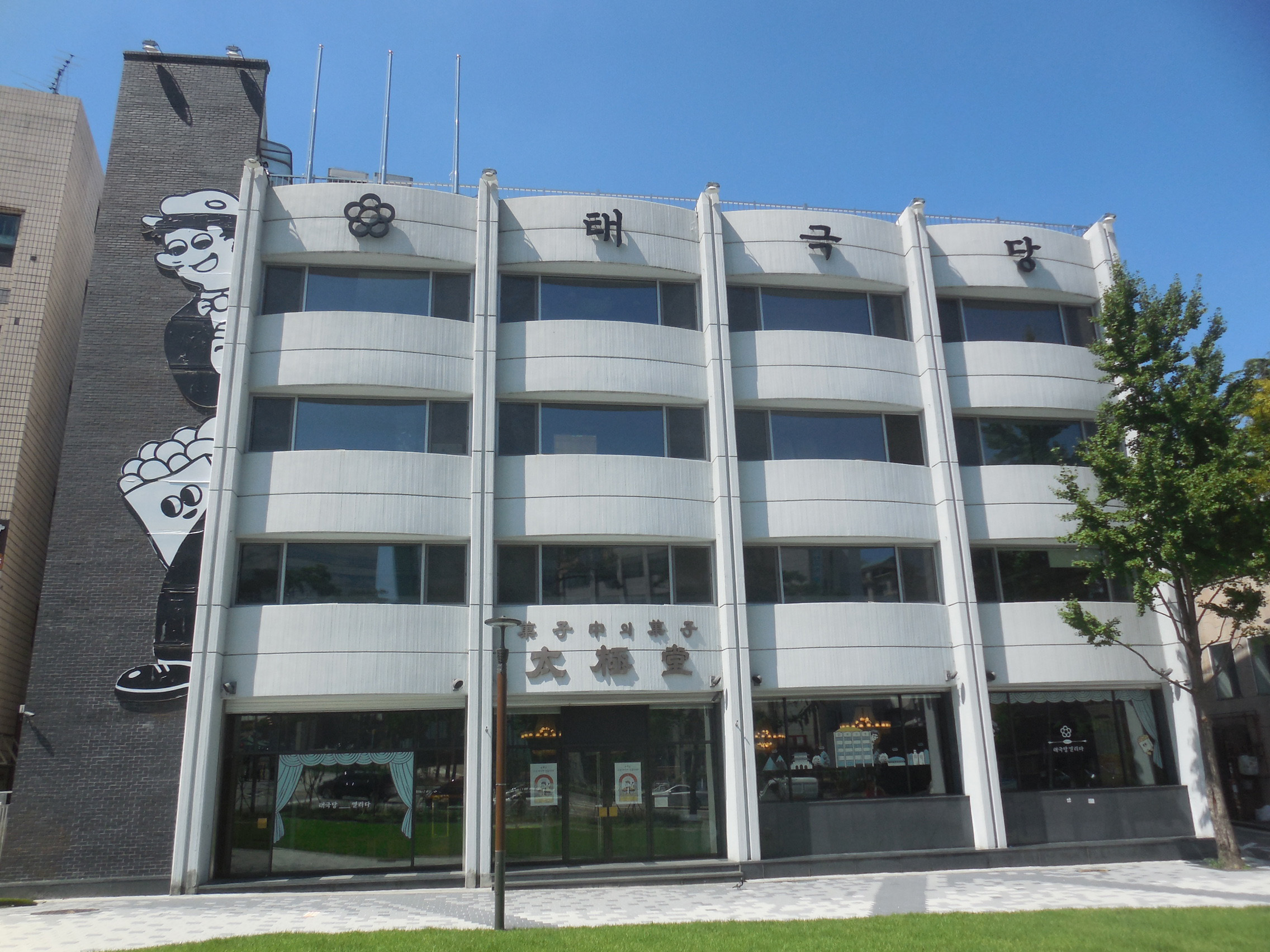
- Taegeukdang's main location in Jangchung-dong (2018)

Restaurant information
- Established: 1946
- Food type: Bakery
- Location: 7 Dongho-ro 24-gil, Jung District, Seoul, South Korea
- Coordinates: 37.5595°N 127.0050°E
- Website: www.taegeukdang.com

Taegeukdang (Korean: 태극당; Hanja: 太極堂) is a historic bakery now located in Jangchung-dong, Jung District, Seoul, South Korea. It was originally founded in 1946 in Myeong-dong, and moved to its current location in 1973. It is considered the oldest active bakery in Seoul. It has remained a family business since then; in 2012 the third generation of the family took over. It is classified as an Oraegage, a store of historic value, by the Seoul Metropolitan Government.

It sells a number of Western and Korean baked goods and confectionaries, including the ice cream sandwich product Monaca Ice Cream (모나카 아이스크림). Also popular are castella and jeonbyeong (sweet small pancakes).

== History ==
The bakery was founded in 1946, after the 1945 liberation of Korea. The owners chose to name the bakery and design its logo after a national symbol of Korea, the taegeuk, in honor of the event. Reportedly, even as Western-sounding names became popular for other bakeries, Taegeukdang intentionally kept its Korean name. In 1947, it introduced an ice cream sandwich product called Monaca Ice Cream. In 2016, it was reported that Han Cheong-su (한청수) was in charge of ice cream in the bakery. He had held this role since 1967; he had previously worked as a delivery boy for the bakery.

The bakery reportedly had its heyday in the 1970s; it had seven branches in Seoul around this time. In 2016, long-time employee Lee Seong-gil (이성길) recalled once receiving a request to bake a birthday cake for South Korean leader Park Chung Hee, all while a security guard watched to make sure the food was safe. However, by the 1980s, the bakery reportedly saw a decline due to competition from chains and fast food. Each of its branches gradually closed, until only the main location in Jangchung-dong remained. The number of employees declined from its peak of 200 to 30.

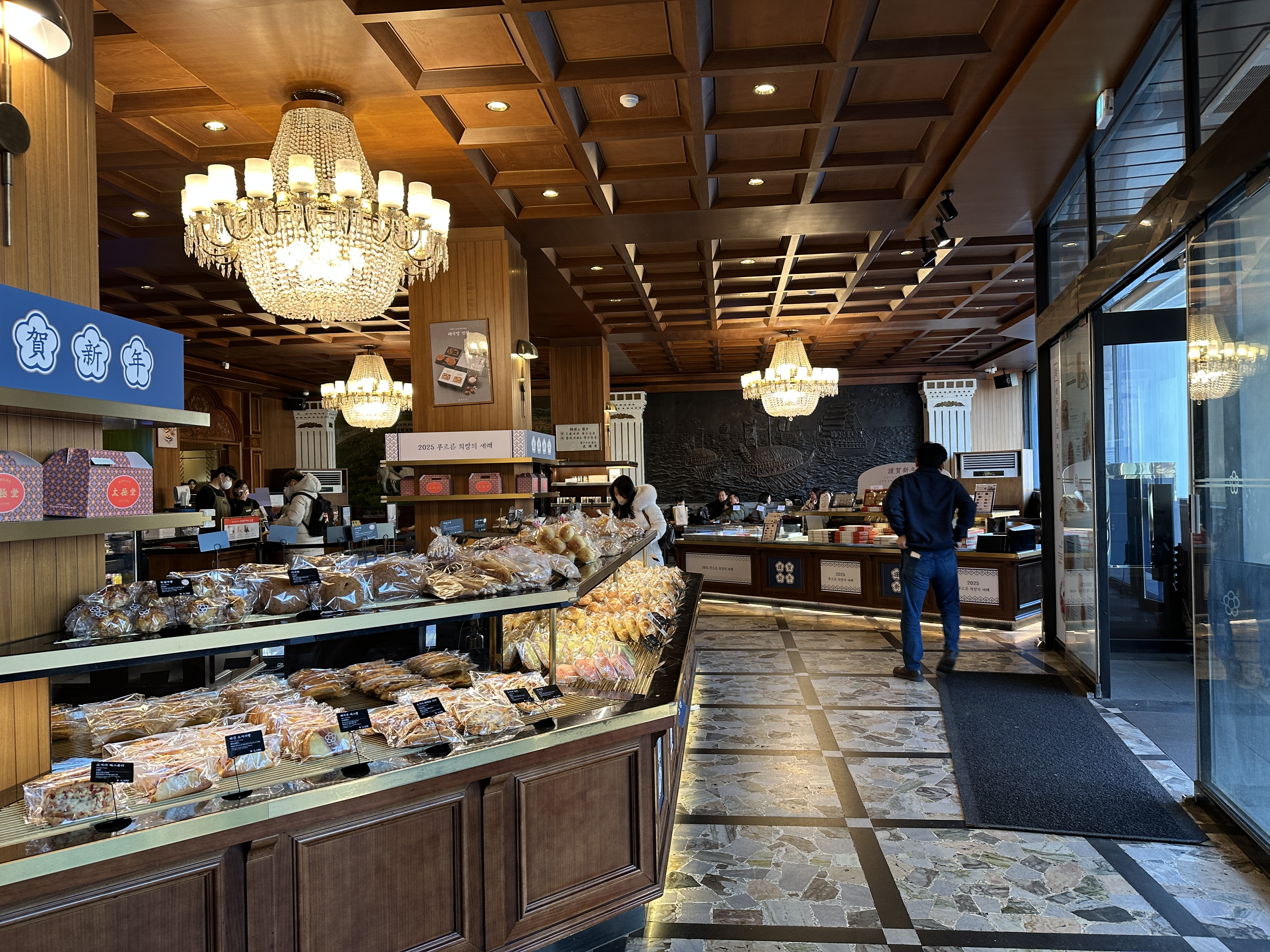
First floor interior of the bakery (2025)

By the mid-2010s, the bakery moved again to expand and modernize. In 2011 or 2012, the third generation (two siblings) took over the business, after their father suddenly fell ill. The main location was renovated in December 2015; a cafe space was added. In 2021, the bakery opened two locations, one in Seoul Station and another in The Hyundai Seoul. In 2023, the bakery opened three new locations: one in Insa-dong, another in Shinsegae Gangnam, and another in Lotte World Mall. By 2023, it had 9 branches around the country.

== See also ==
- Leesungdang – oldest active bakery in South Korea
- Sungsimdang – historic bakery in Daegu
- List of oldest restaurants in South Korea
