= Concha =

Mexican sweet bun

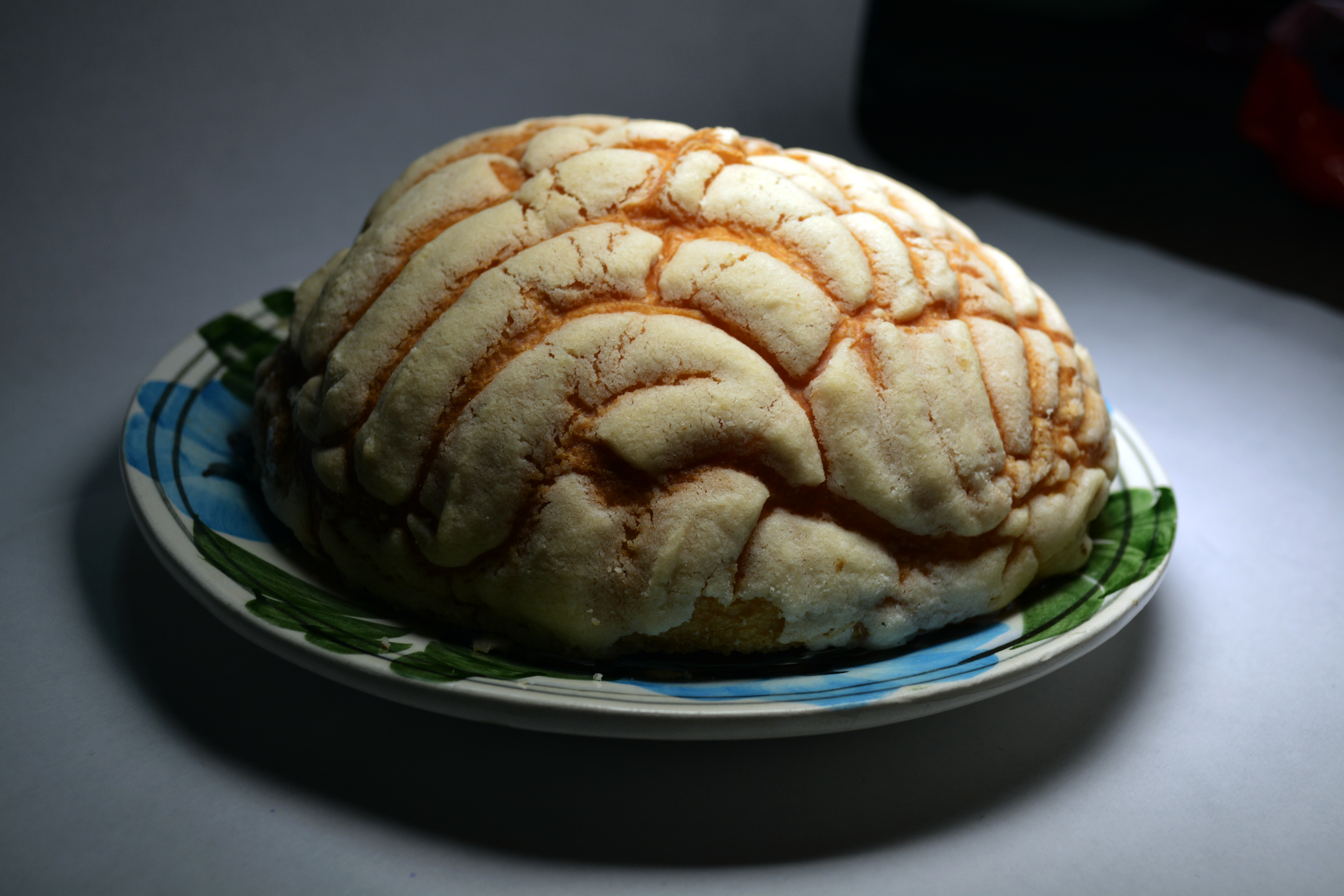
- Concha sold in Mexico City
- Place of origin: Mexico City

A concha (Spanish pronunciation: [ˈkontʃa], 'shell') is a traditional Mexican sweet bread (pan dulce) with similar consistency to a brioche. Conchas get their name from their round shape and their striped, seashell-like appearance. A concha consists of two parts: a sweetened bread roll, and a crunchy topping (composed of flour, butter, and sugar), the most common topping flavors being chocolate, vanilla, and strawberry. Conchas are commonly found throughout Mexico, Guatemala, and their diasporas in panaderias (bakeries). They can also be found in grocery stores and bakeries across the United States.

== History ==
The exact origin of the concha is unknown. Many believe that it dates back to the colonial period, and was introduced by French bakers who settled in Mexico, then known as New Spain. The idea also is believed to have come from a nobleman who dipped a piece of bread into some hot chocolate in front of many people and told them they should do it too.

The first recorded recipe for the sweet bread is from 1820. Through migration, the sweet bread has spread through Central, South, and North America.

== Consumption ==
Conchas are regularly eaten for breakfast, often paired with drinks such as milk or coffee. They are also used in place of bread for some sandwiches. Along with being a common household snack, conchas are also used in some Mexican holidays, as well. One such example is the Day of the Dead, when Mexican families celebrate and honor their loved ones by creating an altar or ofrenda for them and leave various food, pastries, and decorations on it. Conchas are depicted among the foods on the highly decorated ofrenda in the 2017 animated film Coco.

== Recognition ==
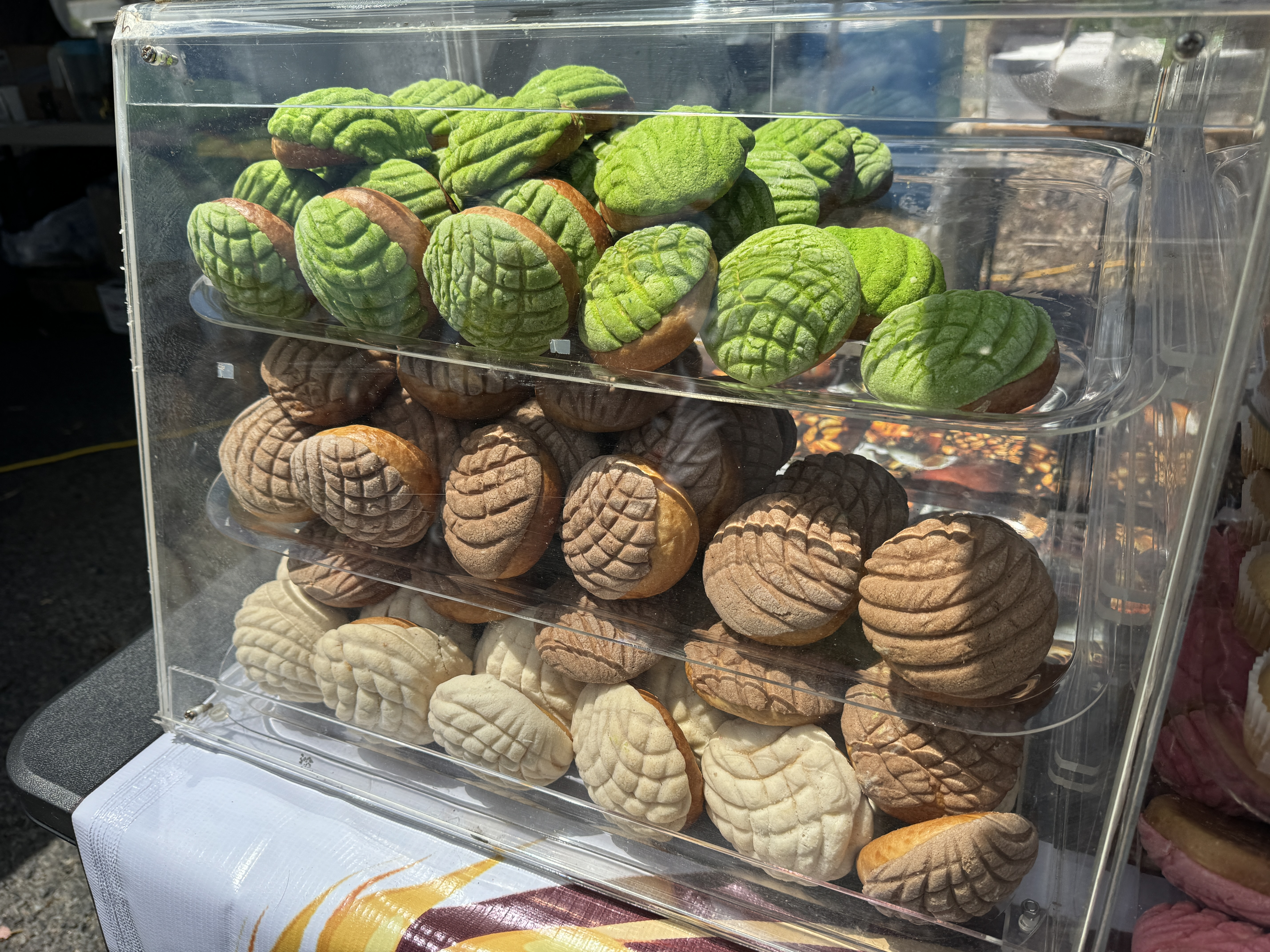
Conchas on display at a food stand at a Cinco de Mayo event in Sonoma, California

In recent years, conchas have gained visibility outside of Mexico. A "concha bun burger" won the James Beard Foundation's Blended Burger Project in 2016. With many bakeries reimagining the concept of a concha, the sweet bread has also received a high level of attention on social media. Conchas have become a symbol of Mexican-American identity. Conchas can now be found packaged in grocery stores across the Americas.

== Recipe ==
To make the bread portion of a concha, most recipes require yeast, butter, flour, oil, sugar, evaporated milk, salt, vanilla extract, cinnamon, and eggs. To make the topping, one would need sugar, butter, flour, and vanilla extract.

== Variations ==
Other pastries are similar to the concha. For example, the Japanese melonpan is made from a similar base with a hard, sweet crust. They slightly differ in that melonpan is scored to resemble a melon rind and generally has a crispier exterior.

Another similar pastry is the pineapple bun, which is a sweet bun that originated in Hong Kong. The pineapple bun was created by a family-owned restaurant in the 1940s, having drawn inspiration from the look of conchas by scoring the sweet bread to look similar to a pineapple skin. The bun itself is also given the name "Mexican bun", after one Ng family who had been expelled from Mexico and opened a bing sutt establishment in Shanghai Street, Kowloon, where they sold these buns inspired by the concha. The "Mexican bun" itself spread to Malaysia with a slightly altered recipe popularised by bakery chain Rotiboy, where it has been generally known as roti kopi (Malay for 'coffee bread') after its coffee-flavoured crust.

== See also ==
- List of pastries
- List of sweet breads
- Mexican breads
- Soboro-ppang
