= Paris Baguette =

South Korean international bakery chain

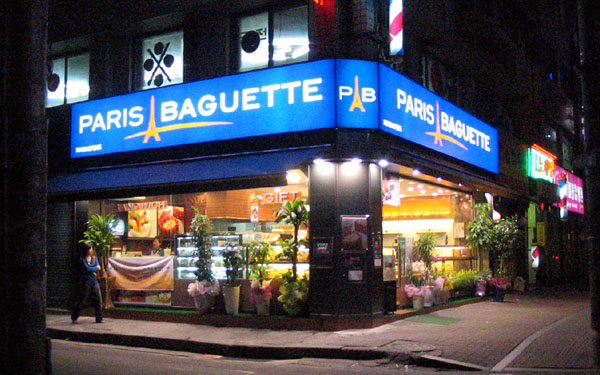
- Paris Baguette location in Yeongdeungpo-gu, South Korea (2006)
- Type: Subsidiary
- Industry: Food
- Founded: 1988; 38 years ago
- Headquarters: Global: Seoul, South Korea; North America: Bergen County, New Jersey
- Key people: Cho Sang-ho (CEO)
- Products: Baguette, croissant, cake in bread, confectionery
- Revenue: 1.51 billion USD (2013)
- Parent: SPC Group
- Website: www.paris.co.kr (in Korean)

Paris Baguette (Korean: 파리바게뜨 ;French pronunciation: [paʁi baɡɛt]) or Paris Croissant (Korean: 파리크라상), is a South Korean multinational chain of bakery-cafés, owned by the SPC Group and headquartered in Seoul. In 1986, it was established as a subsidiary of Shani Co., Ltd., and opened the first Paris Baguette in Gwanghwamun, Seoul, and the first high-end bakery Paris Croissant in Itaewon the following year, and the corporate name changed to the same as the brand name.

Founded in 1988, the franchise brand, Paris Baguette grew into the No. 1 bakery in South Korea in 2004, branching out to local subsidiaries in the United States, headquartered in Bergen County, New Jersey; as well as expanding to Vietnam, Indonesia, Singapore, Mongolia, and other countries. In the U.S., Paris Baguette is particularly popular within the New York metropolitan area.

== Operations ==
In 1988, Paris Croissant launched Paris Baguette, a popular bakery café franchise brand. As of December 2024, the chain had over 3,700 retail stores in South Korea, over 200 stores in the United States, and more than 10 stores in Canada. Paris Baguette also launched retail stores in China, Malaysia, Vietnam, Indonesia, Mongolia, France, United Kingdom, USA and so on.

The U.S. Paris Baguette franchises have concentrated on selling cakes, pastries, and bread, instead of evolving into more general eateries as some other bakery cafés have done.

Since opening its first U.S. store in 2002, Paris Baguette expanded to more than 260 locations across the country by early 2026, up from about 200 stores at the end of 2024.

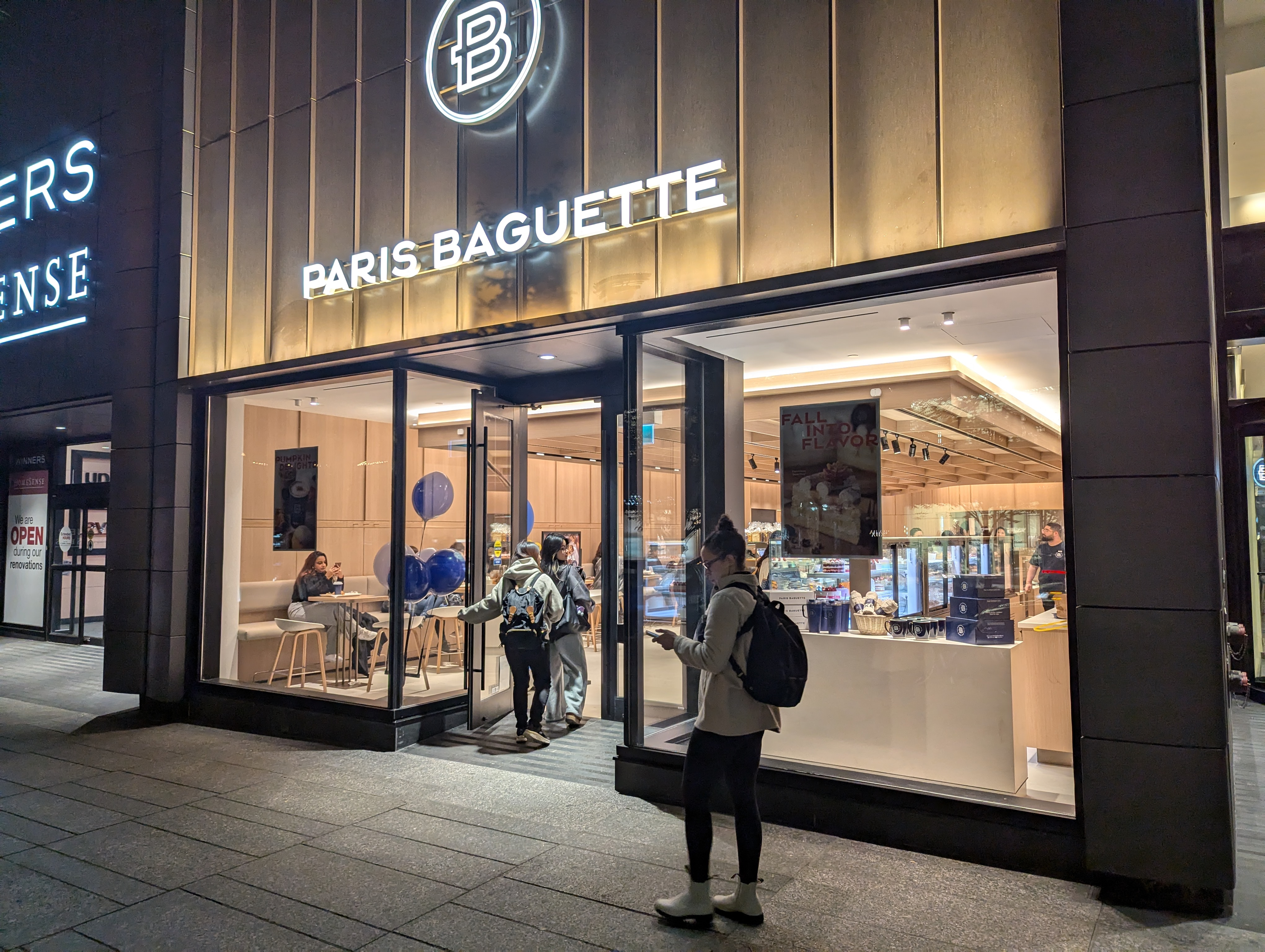
Paris Baguette on Bloor street in Toronto

Caffè Pascucci is an Italian espresso café franchise.

Other franchises of Paris Croissant include LINA's and Tamati (sandwich), Passion5 (upscale dessert gallery), L'atelier (café restaurant). It also handles the Korean branch of Jamba Juice (smoothie).

=== Controversies ===
In 2022, a boycott of Paris Baguette took off after a worker at a Pyeongtaek factory was fatally crushed by a sauce mixing machine. Shortly before the incident another worker at the factory had sustained an injury to their hand from a production machine but was not sent to the hospital since they were not a full-time worker. Various South Korean trade unions have condemned the company due to a history of safety issues and union busting.

== See also ==
- Tous les Jours
- Sungsimdang
