= Pineapple bun =

Hong Kong sweet bun

Pineapple bun/ Polobun
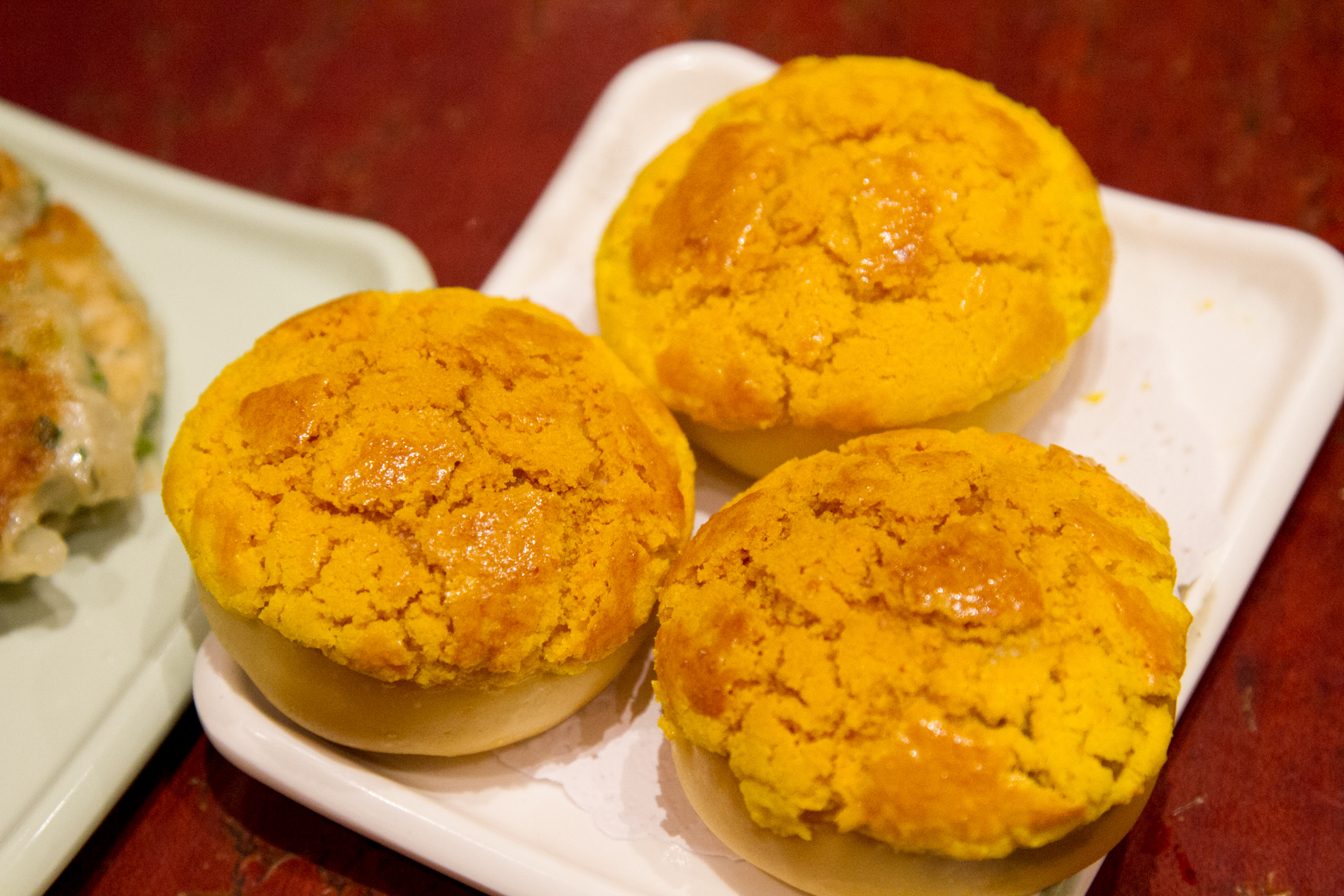
- Alternative names: bo lo baau
- Type: Sweet bun
- Place of origin: Hong Kong
- Main ingredients: Sugar, eggs, flour, vanilla and butter

Pineapple bun
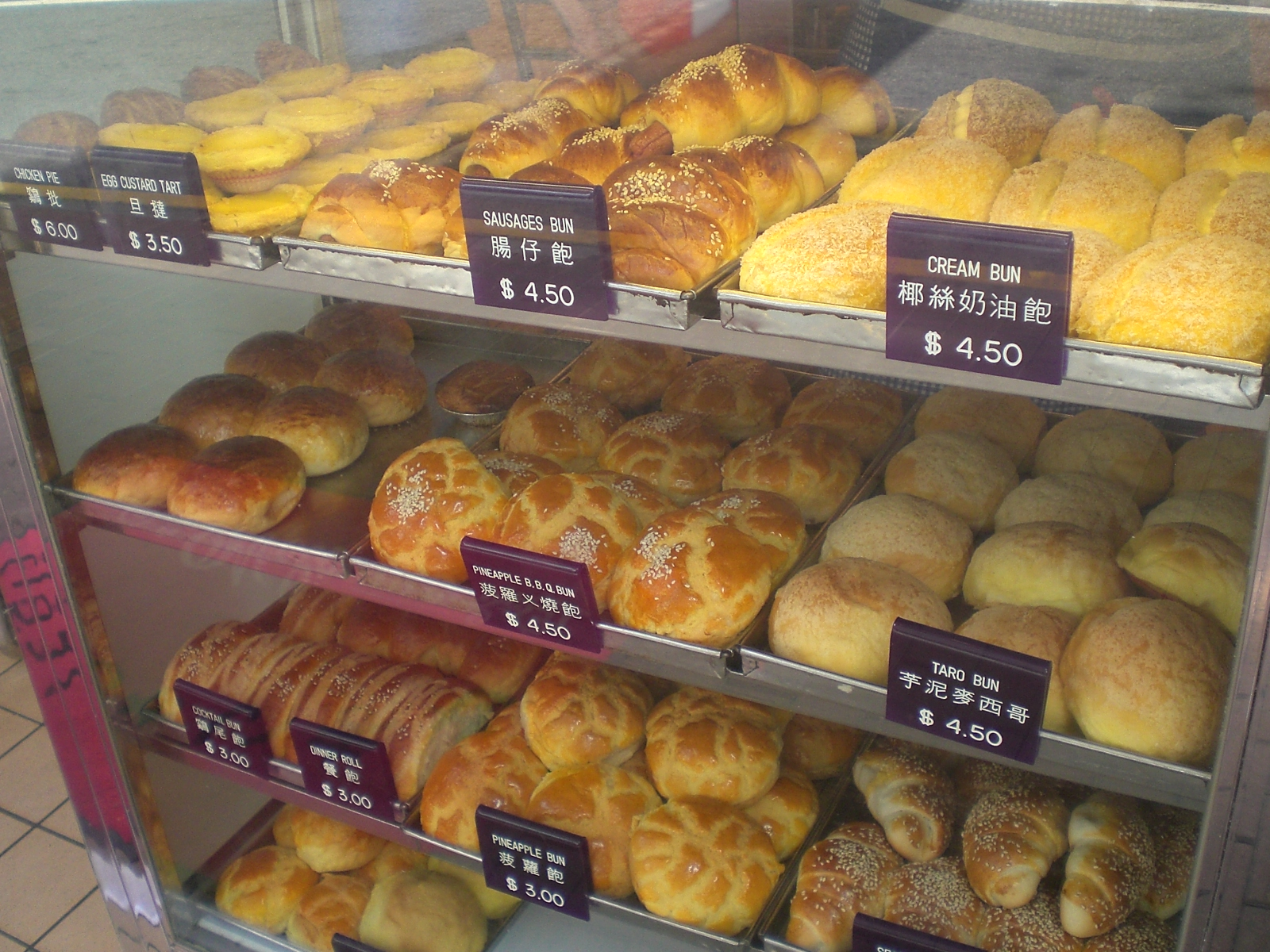
- Traditional Chinese: 菠蘿包
- Simplified Chinese: 菠萝包
- Literal meaning: pineapple bun
Transcriptions
Standard Mandarin
- Hanyu Pinyin: bōluóbāo
Yue: Cantonese
- Yale Romanization: bōlòh bāau
- Jyutping: bo^{1} lo^{4} baau^{1}

Min name
- Chinese: 王梨包
Transcriptions
Southern Min
- Hokkien POJ: ông-lâi-pau

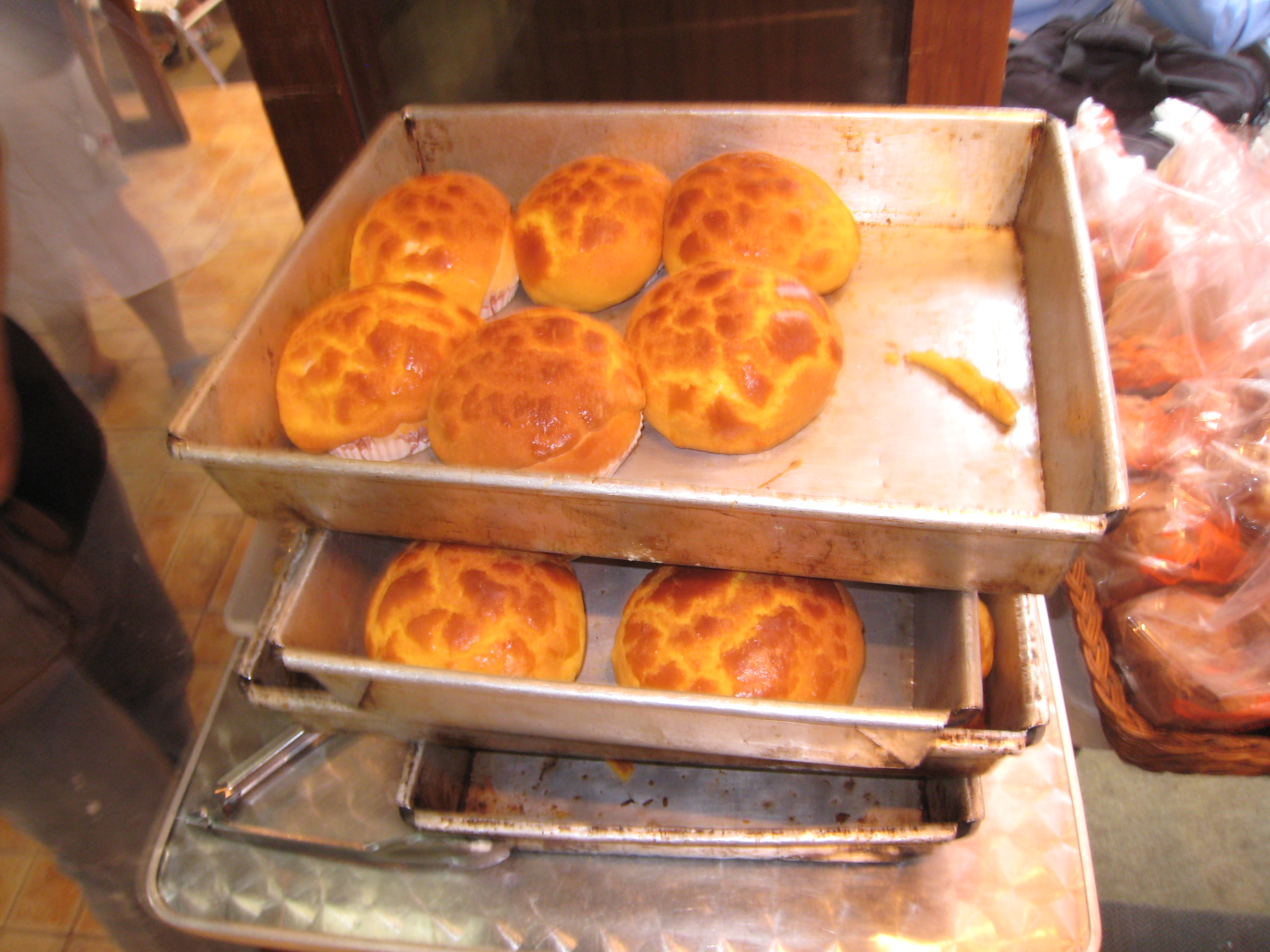
Pineapple buns just out of the oven

A pineapple bun also known as PoloBun (Chinese: 菠蘿包; Jyutping: bo^{1} lo^{4} baau^{1}; Cantonese Yale: bōlòh bāau) is a kind of sweet bun predominantly popular in Hong Kong and also common in Chinatowns worldwide. Despite the name, it does not traditionally contain pineapple; rather, the name refers to the look of the characteristic topping (which resembles the texture of a pineapple).

== History ==
The origin of the pineapple bun is unclear. The earliest documented evidence of the pineapple bun can be traced back to Hong Kong in 1943, possibly influenced by the arrival of Japanese troops in the territory. It was during this time that the Tai Tung Bakery first opened its doors to the public. The shop owner, Tse Ching-yuen, recalls that he has been making pineapple buns since he was just 11 years old. However, he acknowledges that there were similar baked goods in Japan before that period. At the time, they were called 酥皮包 (crispy-skin buns), but customers kept calling them pineapple buns.

By another account, the Ng family was deported from Mexico to Hong Kong and opened a restaurant there in 1946. They slightly adapted the concha to the local palate, creating the pineapple bun.

In June 2014, the government of Hong Kong listed the pineapple bun as a part of Hong Kong's intangible cultural heritage. Tai Tung Bakery in Yuen Long, which had been making pineapple buns for more than 70 years, was a key proponent of including the technique for making the buns on the list of 480 items of living heritage.

== Composition ==
The top of the pineapple bun (the part which is made to resemble a pineapple) is made of a dough similar to that used to make sugar cookies, which consists of sugar, eggs, flour, and lard. It is crunchy and is quite sweet compared to the bread underneath. The bread dough underneath is that which is used in Hong Kong–style breads, which is a softer and sweeter dough than in European breads. It is popular at breakfast or afternoon tea.

Although it is known as a "pineapple bun", the traditional version contains no pineapple. The name originated from the fact that its sugary top crust is cooked to a golden-brown colour, and because its checkered top resembles the skin of a pineapple.

== Buttered variant ==
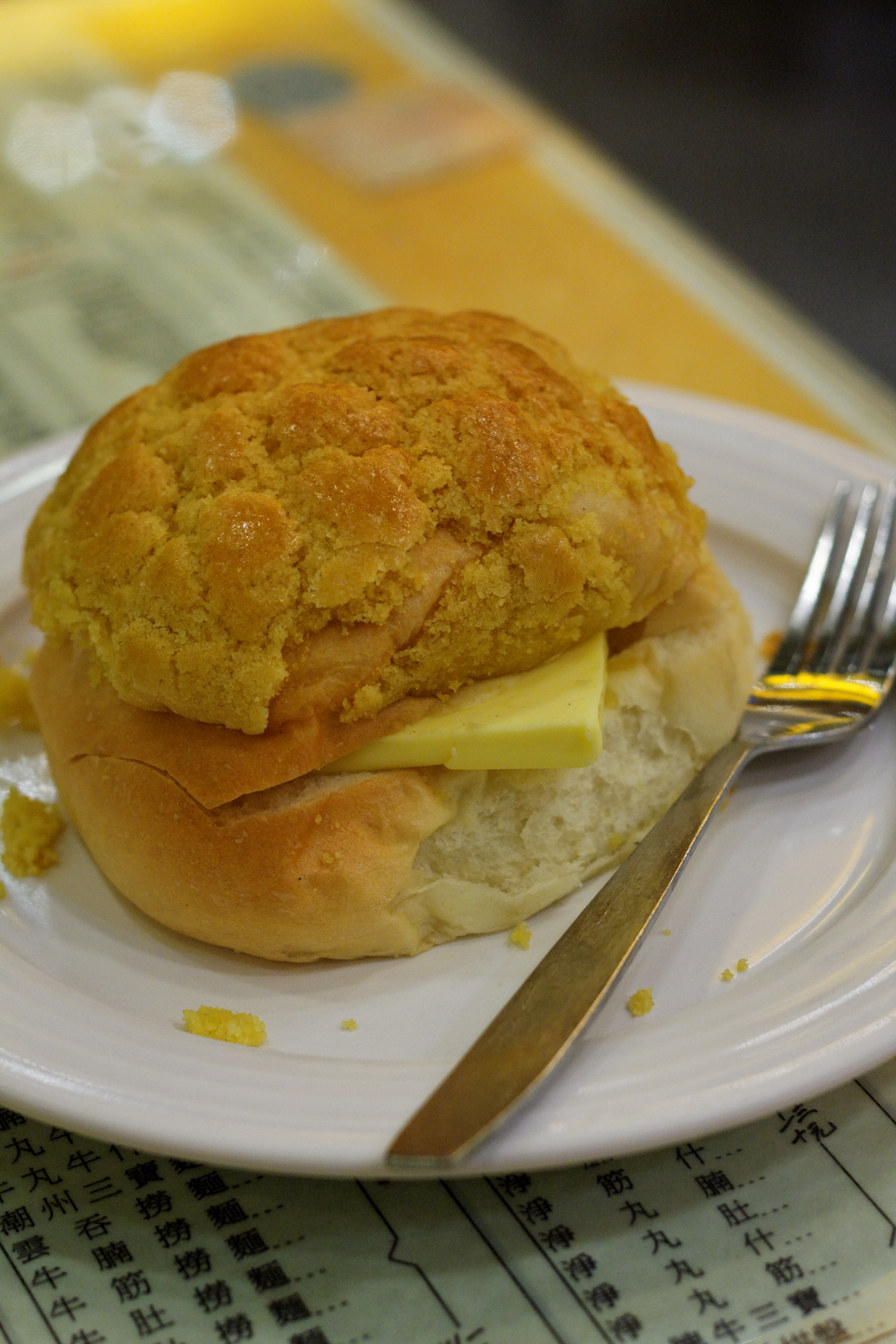
Buttered pineapple bun

Many Hong Kong restaurants, such as cha chaan tengs and dai pai dongs, offer an item called a buttered pineapple bun, which is a pineapple bun with a slice of butter stuffed inside. They are known in Cantonese as boh loh yau (菠蘿油), in which boh loh means "pineapple", and yau (oil) refers to butter.

Typically the bun is brought hot from the oven to the diner's table, and served halved with a large slab of butter in between the halves.

== Other common variants ==
The pineapple bun may come in miniature sizes, it may be used as a bread roll for sandwiches with luncheon meat, or it may be pre-stuffed with red bean paste, custard cream (奶黃), barbecued pork, or a sweet filling of shredded coconut (椰絲) like that in a cocktail bun. It is possible to order a "pineapple pineapple bun", actually stuffed with pineapple.

Japanese melonpan and Korean soboro bread are variants that use the same ingredients for a German streusel-like texture on top, but without resemblance to a pineapple.

== Controversy ==
In October 2020, a Japanese bakery c'est très fou launched the product "Taiwanese pineapple bun", which received criticism for suggesting the product originated in Taiwan, though the bakery's introduction of the product had correctly mentioned that the bun originated in Hong Kong. In January 2021, another Japanese bakery was criticized for calling it "Taiwan pineapple bun".

== See also ==
- List of buns
- Melonpan
- Tiger bread
- Soboro-ppang
- Concha
