= Melonpan =

Japanese sweet bread

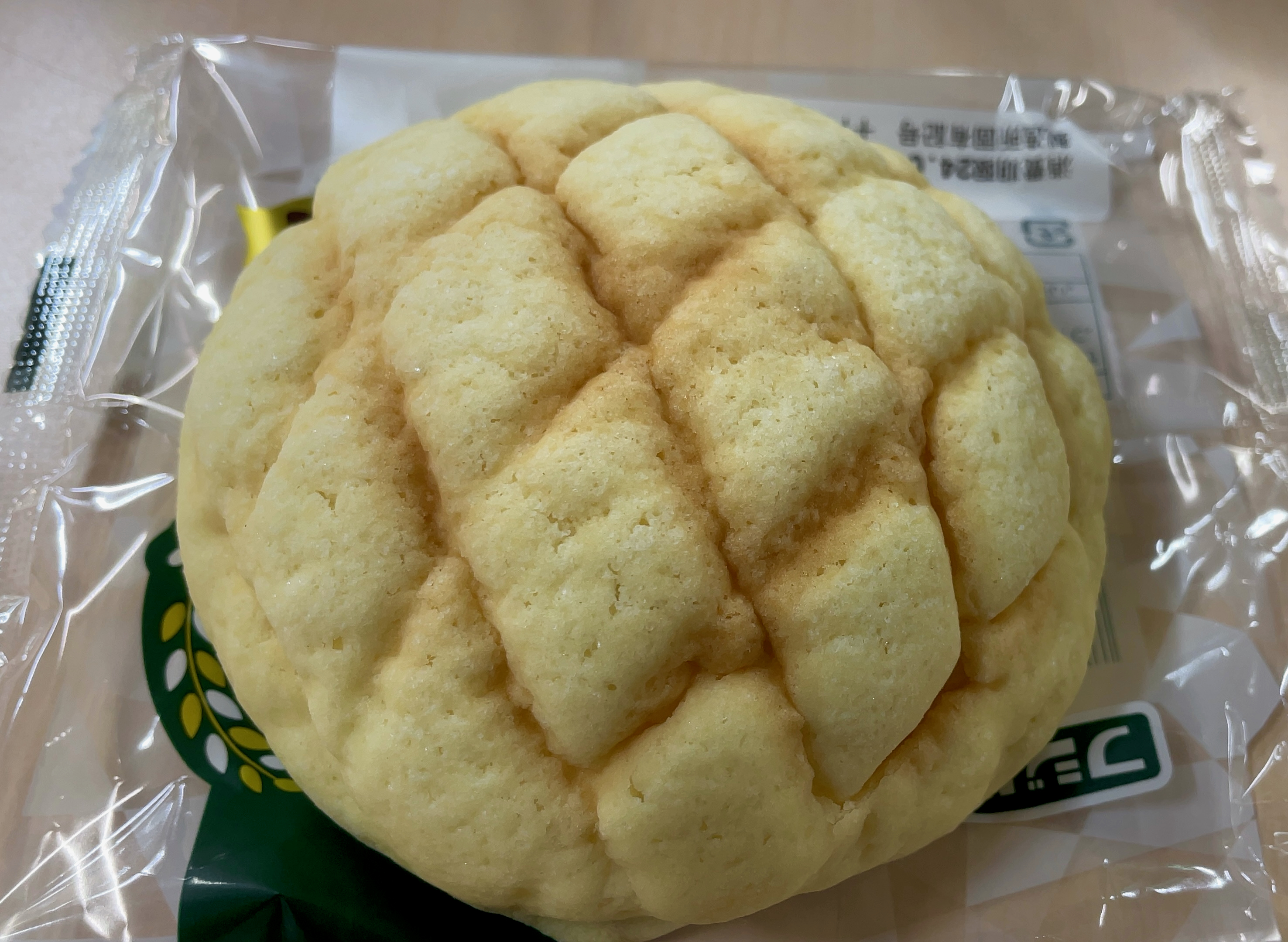
- Melonpan, with characteristic crisscross pattern
- Alternative names: Melon pan; Melon bun; Melon bread
- Type: Sweet bun
- Place of origin: Japan
- Region or state: East Asia
- Main ingredients: Dough; Cookie dough

Melonpan (メロンパン, meronpan), also called melon bun or melon bread, is a Japanese sweetbun covered in a layer of crispy cookie dough. The texture resembles that of a melon, such as a cantaloupe. It is not traditionally melon-flavored.

Melonpan and pineapple bun from Hong Kong are very similar. By comparison, the Japanese style is lighter in weight and taste, slightly drier, and has a firmer outer layer (including top cookie crust) that resists flaking, unlike its Hong Kong counterpart, whose top cookie crust tends to flake easily. The Hong Kong version is also moister and is generally soft on the outside and inside, with a stronger butter flavor.

== Etymology ==
Melonpan consists of two loanwords: the word melon and the Portuguese word pão, meaning "bread". It is called that because the grid or net-like pattern of the crispy surface looks like the rind of some melons.

== History ==
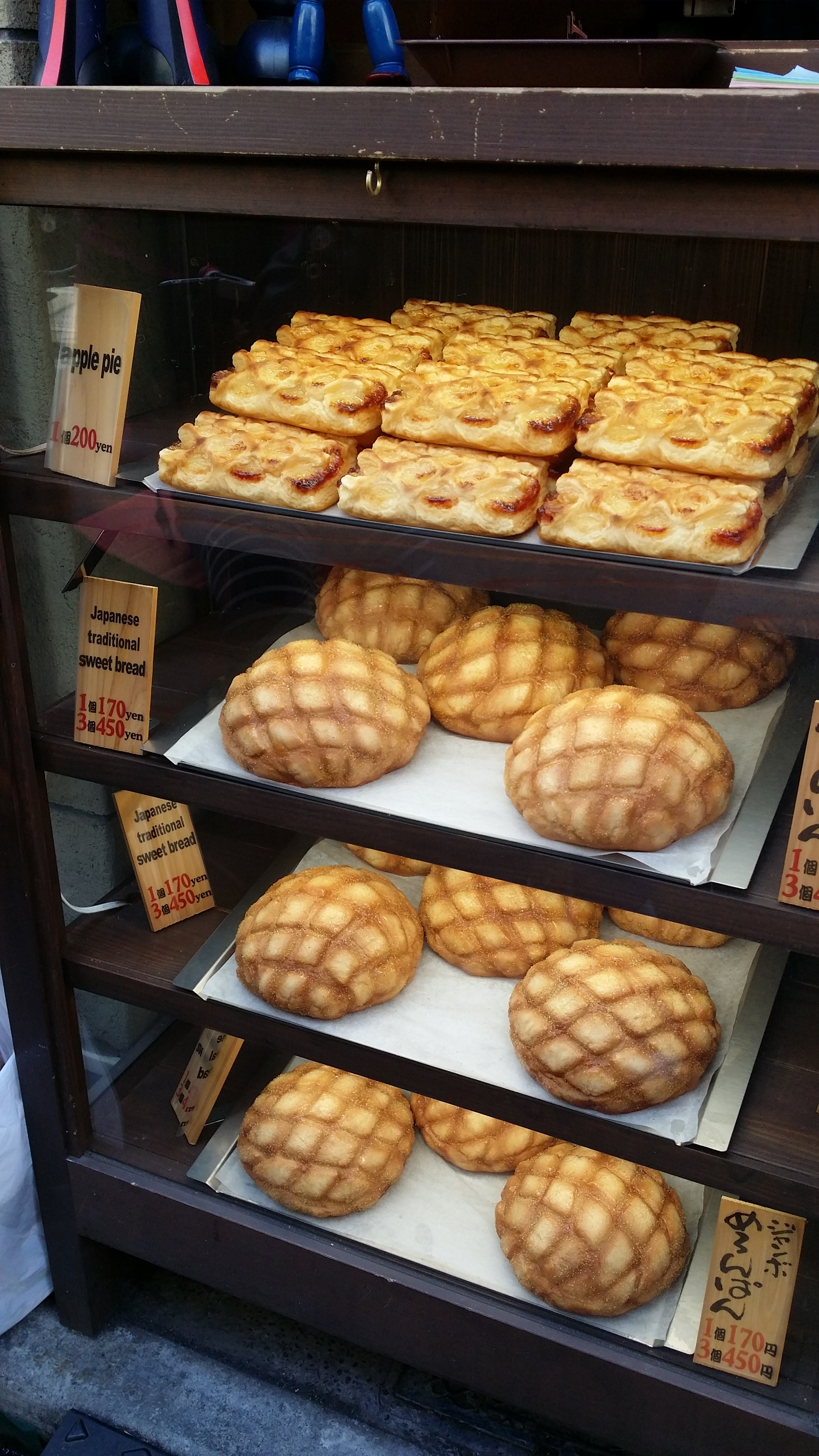
Jumbo melonpan for sale in Asakusa

There are several competing theories about melonpan's origin.

- One theory is that after World War I, Okura Kihachiro brought an Armenian baker, Hovhannes Ghevenian, also known as Ivan Sagoyan, to Tokyo. Sagoyan worked at the Imperial Hotel in Tokyo and invented the bread following Russian, French, and Viennese baking techniques. However, if Sagoyan was indeed the inventor, he did not refer to the bread as "melonpan".
- Alternatively, the bread (specifically its shape and method of production) invented by the bakery owner Kikujiro Mitsugawa in 1930 could have been melonpan. Records from the time describe covering the bread dough with cake dough and adding flavors like coffee or banana, albeit with no mention of the bread's name.
- Another theory states that the round bread with biscuit dough on top called "Sunrise" sold by Kinseido's Obama branch in Kobe in the 1930s was the first melonpan in Japan.
- Other theories point to origins in the Mexican pastry conchas and the German pastry Streuselkuchen, which were introduced to Japan from the United States following World War II.

== Variations ==
Many variations of melonpan exist. Though not originally melon-flavored, it has become popular for manufacturers to actually add melon flavoring to melonpan.

They can be baked with caramel or chocolate, and filled or covered with cream or custard. Some contain chocolate chips between the cookie and bread layer. In the case of such variations, the name may drop the word "melon", instead replacing it with the name of the contents (such as "maple pan" for a maple syrup flavored bread) or may keep it despite the lack of melon flavor (such as "chocolate melon pan").

In parts of the Kansai, Chūgoku, and Shikoku regions, a variation with a radiating line pattern is called "sunrise", and many residents of these regions call even the cross-hatched melon pan "sunrise".

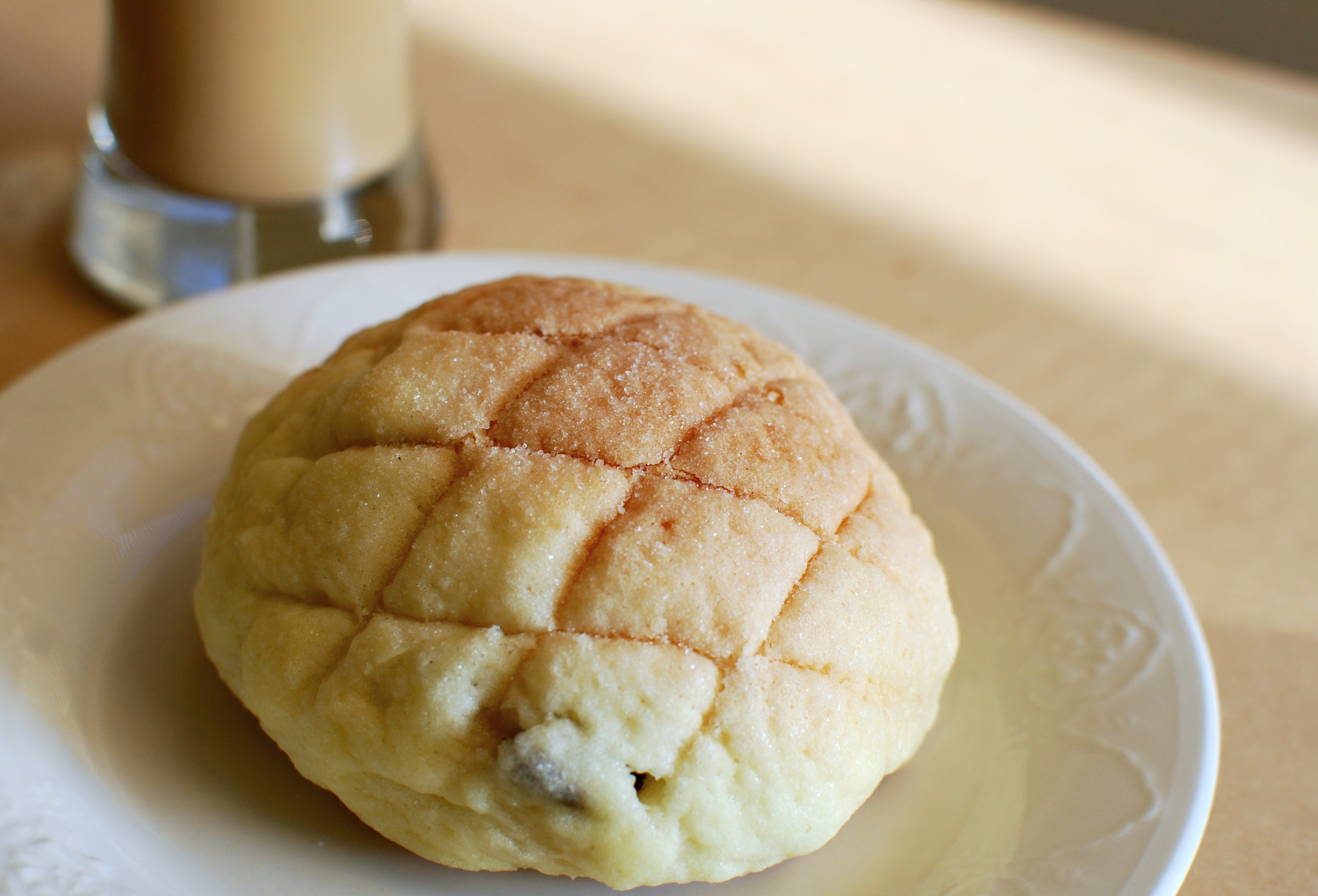
Regular

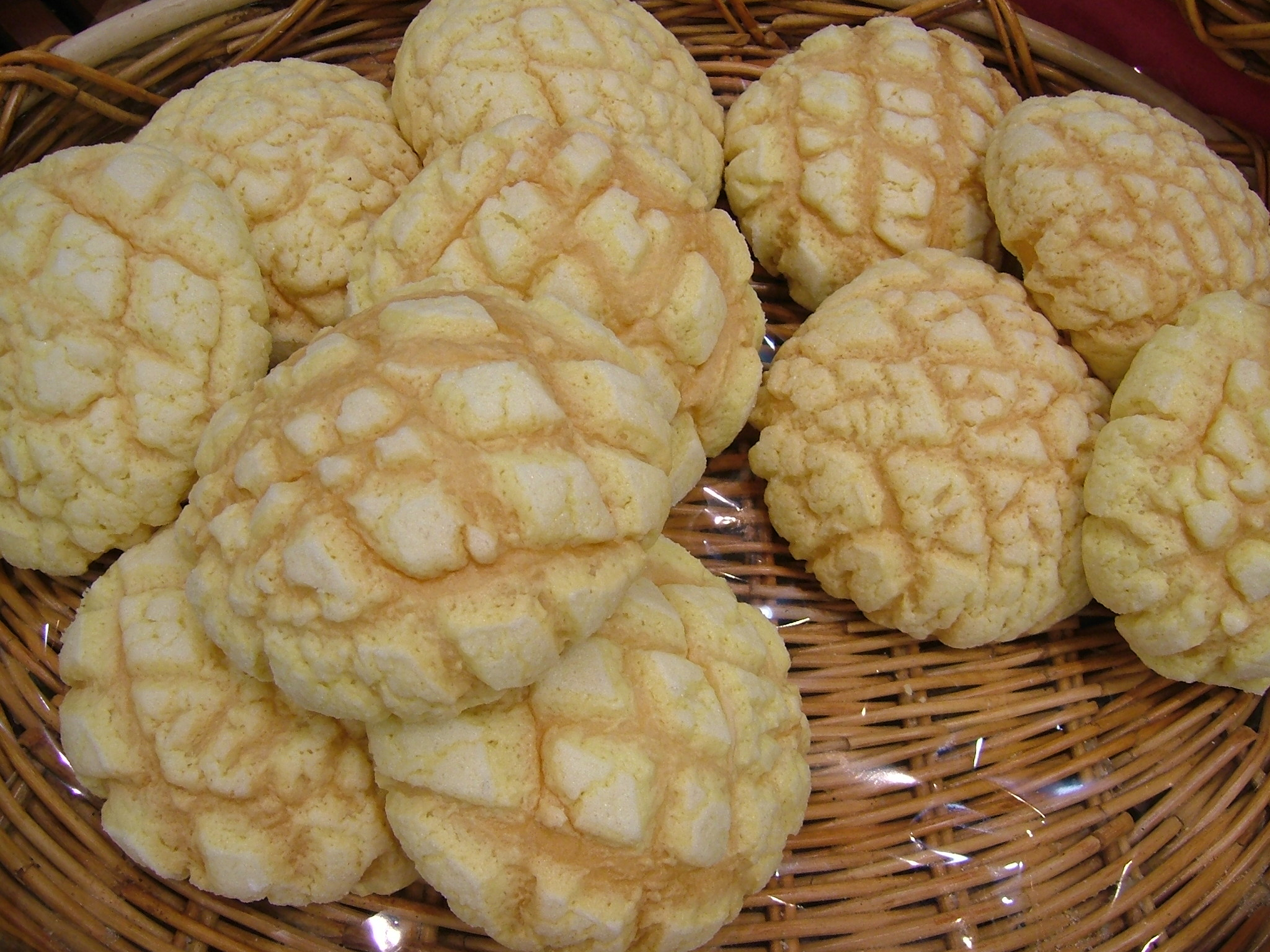
Regular

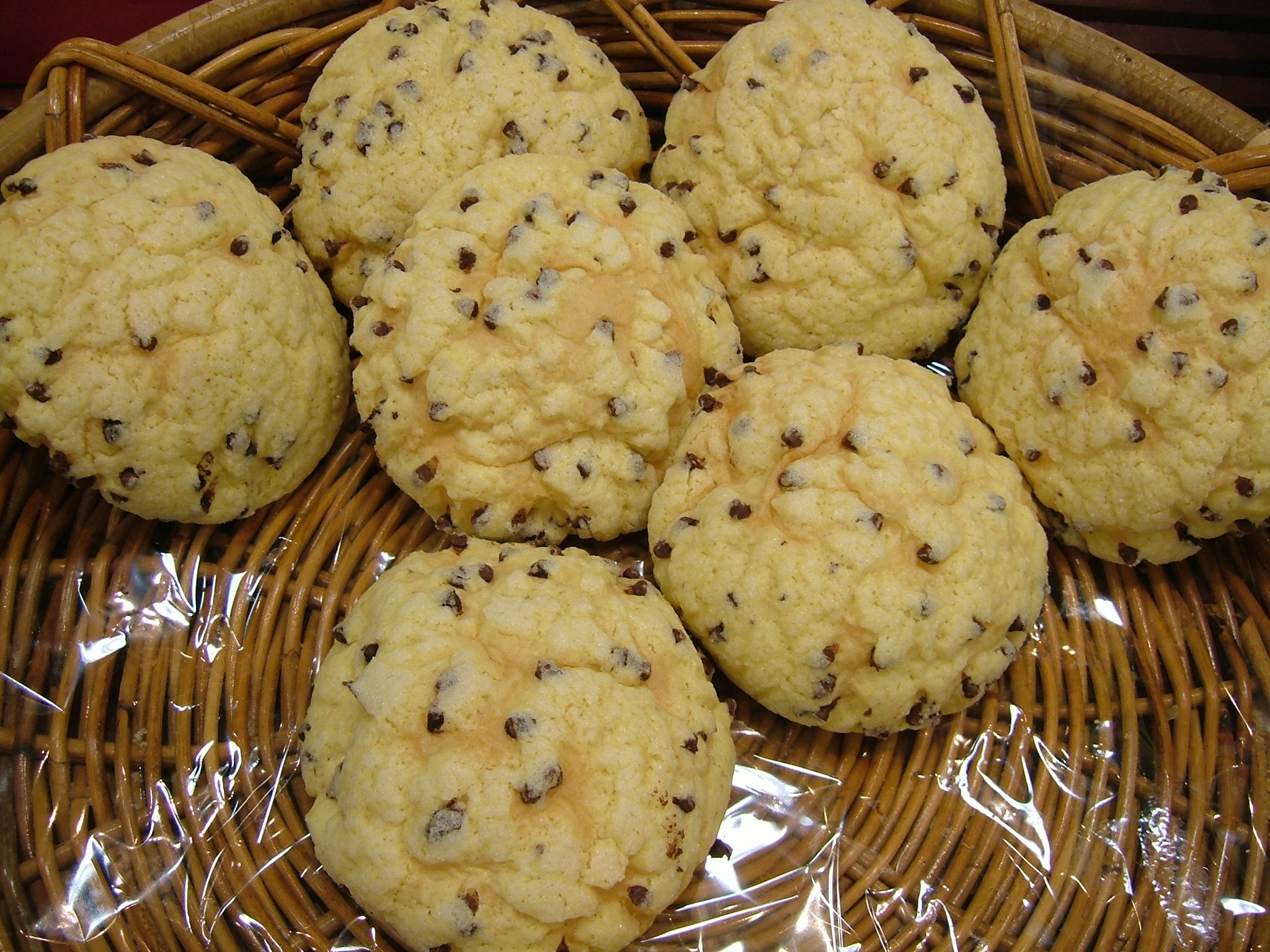
With chocolate chips

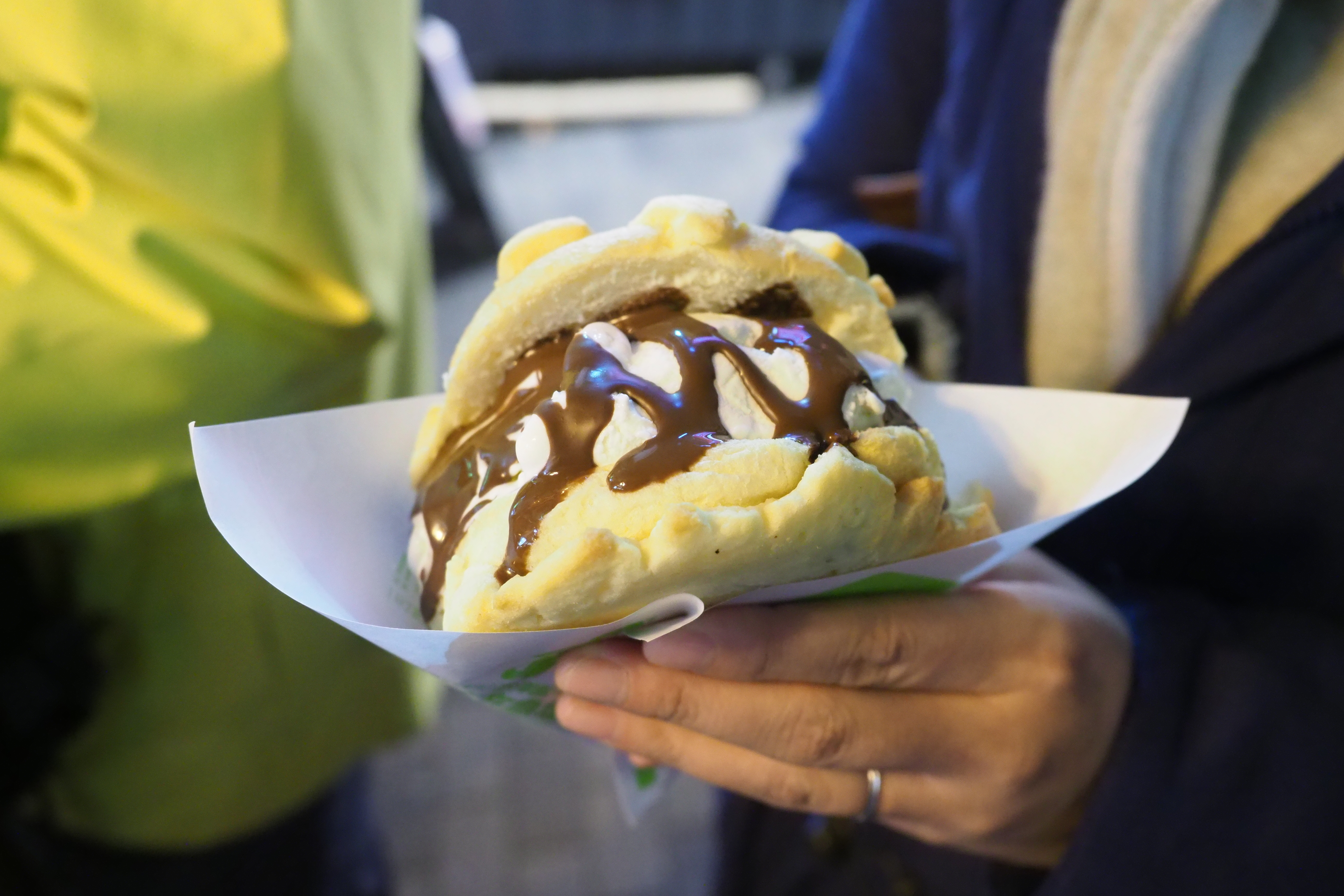
With cream

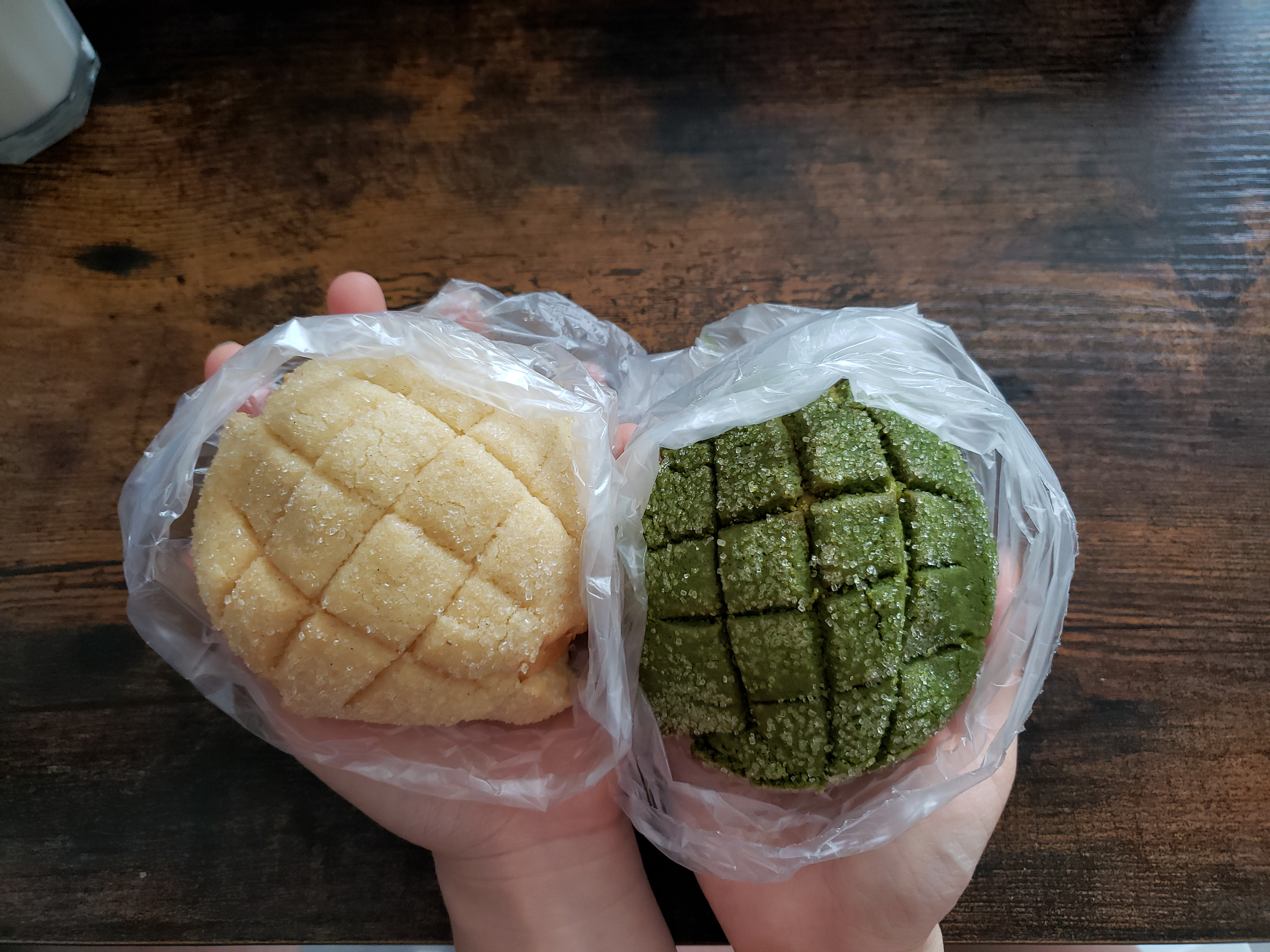
Regular and green tea flavor

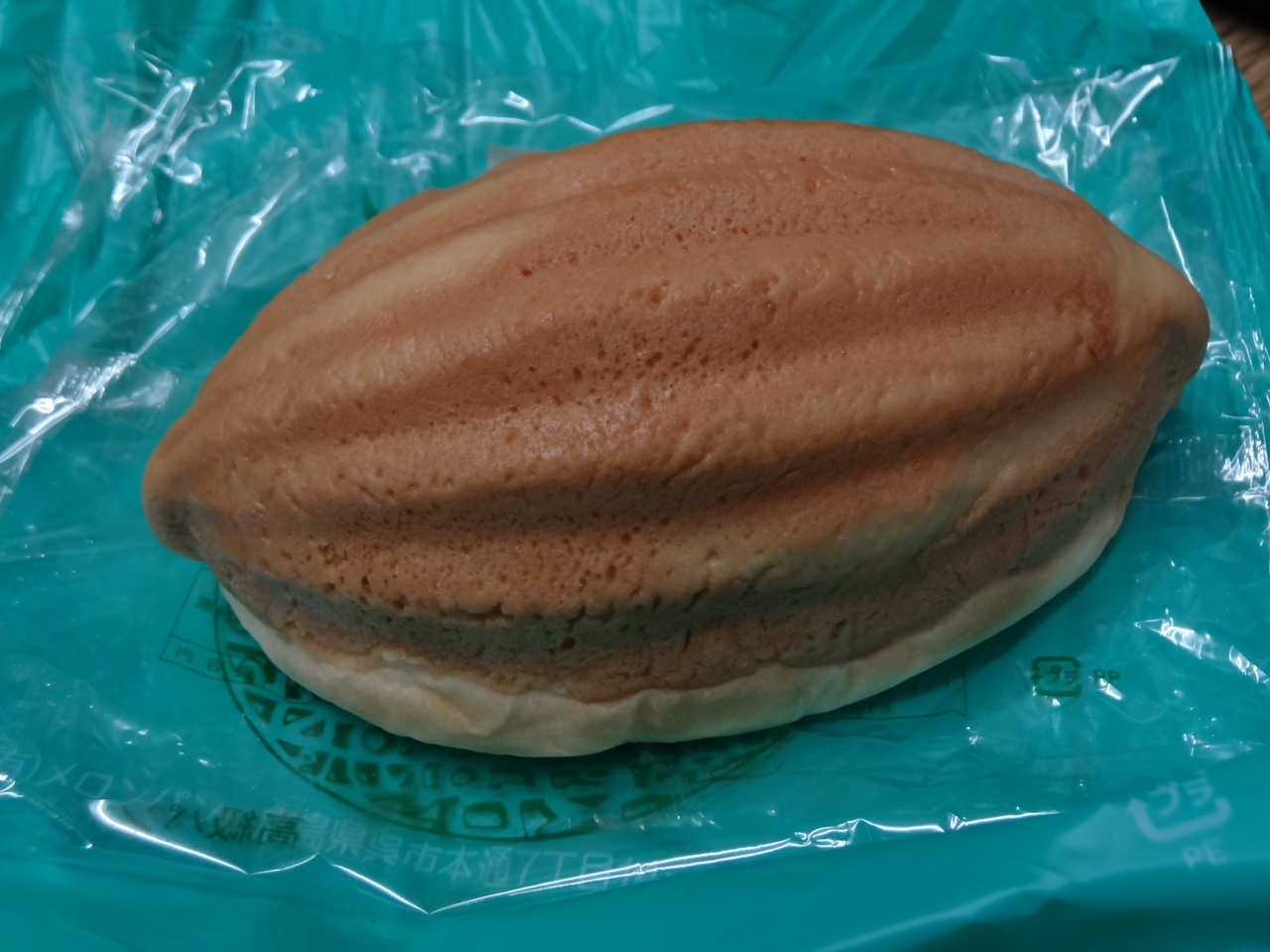

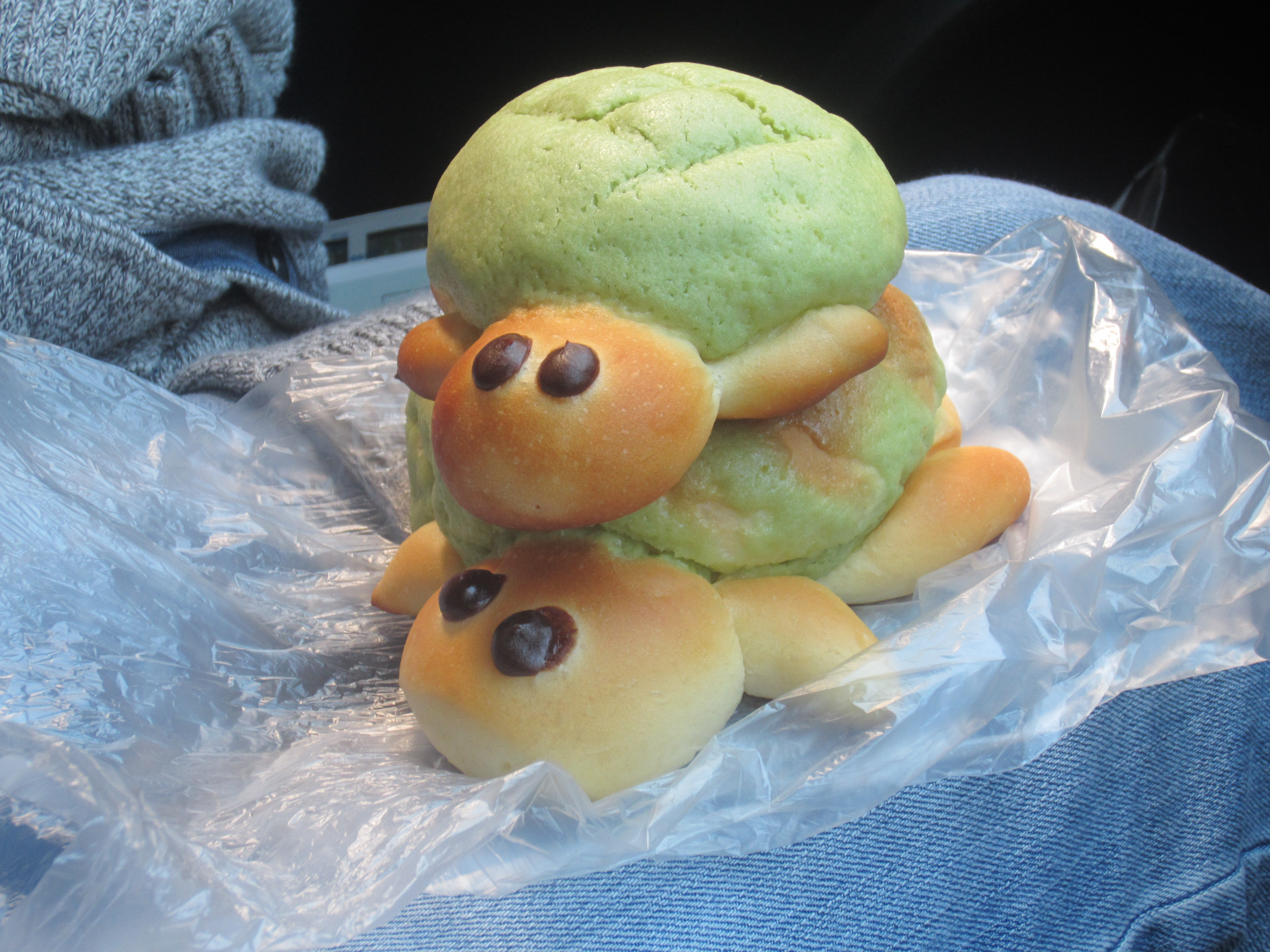

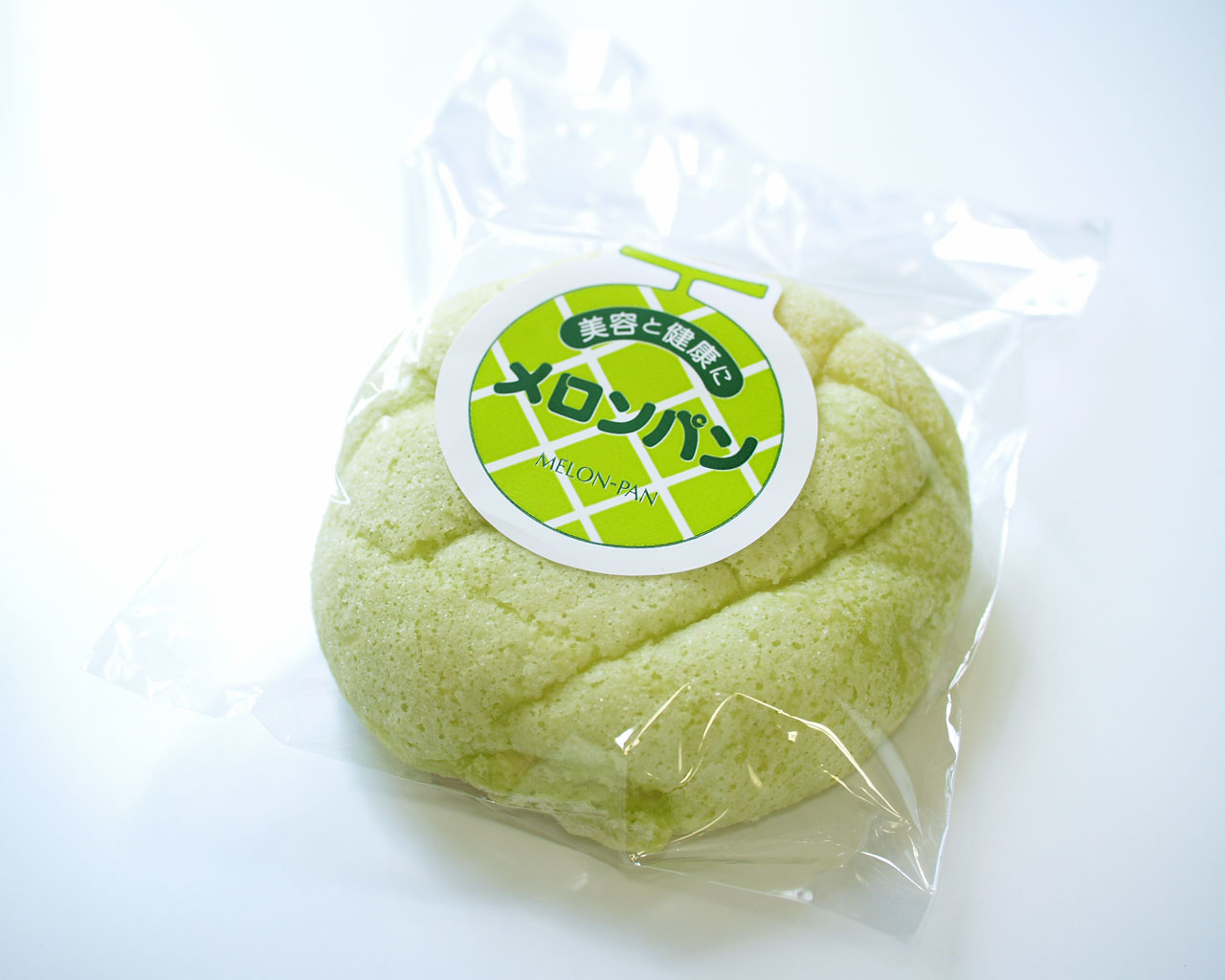

== See also ==
- Concha
- Pineapple bun
- Soboro-ppang
- List of buns
