= SPC Group =

South Korean conglomerate

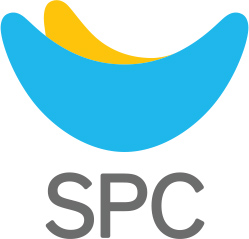
- Native name: 에스피씨 그룹
- Type: Public
- Industry: Food
- Founded: October 28, 1945; 81 years ago
- Headquarters: Seoul, South Korea
- Key people: Hur Young-in (Chairman)
- Products: Bread, Confectionery, Food Service
- Revenue: ₩ 6.7 trillion; US$ 5.7 billion (2020)
- Subsidiaries: Samlip General Food; Paris Baguette; BR Korea
- Website: http://www.spc.co.kr

SPC Group (Korean: 에스피씨 그룹) is a South Korean food company based in Seoul that manufactures food, bread, and other confectionery products. Sangmidang, the precursor of Samlip General Food was founded in 1945 and the group was launched in 2004. SPC Group is one of the oldest brands in the confectionery and bakery industry in Korea. Its catering facilities are based in Seongnam, Gyeonggi Province.

In addition to Samlip General Food and Shany, SPC Group has franchise brands such as Paris Baguette (Bakery) and BR Korea (Donuts and Ice Cream) as subsidiaries. The company also has SPL, SPC Capital, Samlip GFS, and Mildawon, to name a few, as the subsidiary companies, further broadening business scope with overseas establishments in the United States, China, Vietnam, and Singapore.

"SPC" stands for "Samlip/Shany," "Paris Croissant," and "Companies (including BR Korea and other subsidiaries of today and tomorrow)."

== History ==
In 1945, Hur Chang-sung started a small confectionery outfit named Sangmidang. In 1959 the business was renamed to Samlip. A couple of years later, Samlip began to produce bread and biscuits. His business was aligned with government policies. Their first product was a cream-filled pastry. Samlip's quality was high for sales in US military camps. In the late 1960s, there were many competitors including Koryo Dang Bakery, Tae Geuk Dang, and New York Bakery. In 1972, Hur set up another arm called Shany to specialize in High-end cakes. Eventually, Hur's son, Hur Young-in oversaw Shany's operation and took over the Samlip group.

=== Labour-related issues ===
==== Employment of bakers ====
In September 2017, SPC was found to have illegally dispatched 5,000 bakers who were hired through partner firms by the Ministry of Employment and Labor (MOEL). These bakers were instructed directly by SPC Group. Such employment practices usually helped the company involved to reduce hiring costs as they would not need to give these dispatched labor benefits such as paid vacation or health insurance. MOEL directed SPC Group to employ the bakers directly, but as of 2022, the group has yet to resolve the issue, having not implemented an agreement under which the 5,000 bakers would be employed by a 51-percent-owned subsidiary.

==== Workplace safety ====
On October 15, 2022, a 23-year-old worker died on the floor of a bread factory affiliated with SPC. The worker was caught in an industrial mixer. Public opinions about the group turned sour after allegations that the company put a screen around the mixer involved and expected the other workers to continue working on the floor. Officials from MOEL went to investigate and stop the machines without safety locks. The company did so as the Ministry only initially ordered a suspension of work on the mixer. Operations on the production floor were suspended the following day after the Ministry recommended further action. This triggered calls for a boycott of the group's brands nationwide. The company also issued a statement initially stating that the deceased worker was working "in a team of two"; however, testimony by her colleagues refuted the statement. The deceased worker had been "repeatedly putting in as much as 15 to 20 kg of raw materials into a 120 cm-high machine alone while standing in front of the machine", while the alleged teammate was working on other sandwich ingredients. On October 24, 2022, it was revealed that the group had more than 100 industrial accidents per year lodged with the Korea Occupational Safety and Health Agency since 2019.

==== Corporate restructuring ====
In January 2026, SPC Group restructured Paris Croissant—which had functioned as the group's de facto holding company by holding stakes in most affiliates—into a new holding company, Sangmidang Holdings (SMDH), and a separate operating company retaining the Paris Croissant name, via a corporate split. The company said the move was intended to strengthen governance transparency ahead of further overseas expansion.

== Subsidiaries ==
=== Samlip General Food ===
Samlip General Food (KRX: 005610) is headquartered in Siheung. Samlip General Food, formerly known as Sangmidang, was established in October 1945 by Hur Chang-sung, and is a forerunner of the SPC Group. It makes bread and confectionery products. Its manufacturing centers are based in Jeongwang-dong Siheung Gyeonggi Province and Daegu. The company's Core Identity was further reinforced through the acquisition of Shany, a high-end cake brand established in 1972. Samlip is also diversifying its business into tteok (Korean rice cake) and restaurant franchising.

=== Shany ===
The company is headquartered in Seongnam. It was established on October 15, 1972 under the previous name Hankook International Foods. It makes bread and confectionery products. Its manufacturing centers are based in Sangdaewon-dong Seongnam Gyeonggi Province, Gwangju, and Daegu. The company was incorporated as a group member by Samlip General Food.

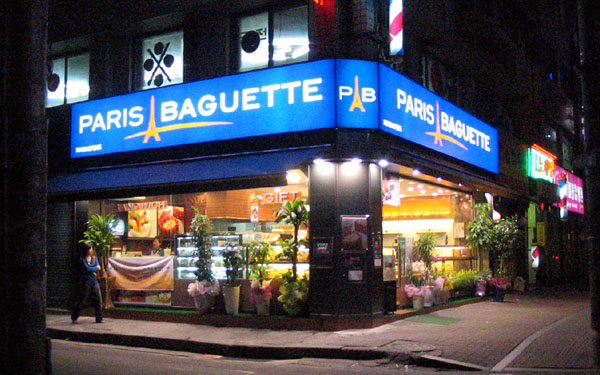
Paris Baguette, Yeongdeungpo-gu, 2006

=== Paris Croissant ===
Paris Croissant is a South Korean franchise bakery that utilizes authentic French baking. In 1988, Paris Croissant launched Paris Baguette, which grew into a top bakery café franchise brand in Korea. With the expansion into the Chinese market in 2004, the company began going global and now has local subsidiaries in the US, Vietnam, and Singapore. Other F&B brands include Paris Croissant Café (premium bakery café), Pascucci (Italian espresso café), LINA's and Tamati (sandwich), Passion5 (upscale dessert gallery), L’atelier (café restaurant), and Jamba Juice (smoothie). The company is also rapidly gaining traction in the restaurant industry with brands such as Queens Park (organic), LaGrilla (Italian), The World Vine (wine), Parlour (European casual cuisine), and Vera Napoli. In 2013, the company’s revenue was US$1.51 billion. In the United States, Paris Baguette operates under the name Paris Baguette Café. The company opened its first U.S. store in 2005 and, as of 2026, operates in 30 states. In June 2026, it announced that it had opened its first U.S. airport location, a grab-and-go store at Philadelphia International Airport, which the company described as its 300th store in the United States. The company has said it aims to reach 1,000 U.S. stores by 2030.

=== BR Korea ===
BR Korea is a joint venture established by the SPC Group and Dunkin' Brands, Inc. in 1985. In the first year, the company launched Baskin Robbins, cultivating the premium ice cream market in Korea. In 1993, BR Korea launched Dunkin' Donuts, leading the way to dominating the donut segment of the Korean baked goods market. Due to much continuous growth, BR Korea now operates over 1800 Baskin Robbins and Dunkin' Donuts brand stores. Ice cream is produced in BR Korea's Eumseung plant with a certified Hazard Analysis Critical Control Points system (HACCP), and coffee beans are roasted in BR Korea's large-scale roasting center.

=== Other subsidiaries ===
- SPC Logistics
- SPC Cloud
- SPC Networks
- SPC Capital
- Samlip GFS
- Sungil Chemical
- Mildawon
- S Dairy Foods

== Brands ==
- Samlip
  - KBO Bread (in association with 9 KBO Teams)
- Shany
- Bizeun
- Eggslut (Singapore)
- Paris Croissant
- Paris Baguette
- Shake Shack (Korea, Singapore and Malaysia)
- Baskin Robbins (Korea)
- Dunkin' Donuts (Korea)
- Caffè Pascucci
- Jamba Juice (Korea)
- Passion 5
- Lagrillia
- Queens Park
- L'atelier
- Parlour
- Vera Napoli
- Lina's
- Tamati
- The World Wine
- strEAT

== See also ==
- Economy of South Korea
- Hur Young-in
