= Soboro-ppang =

Korean streusel bread

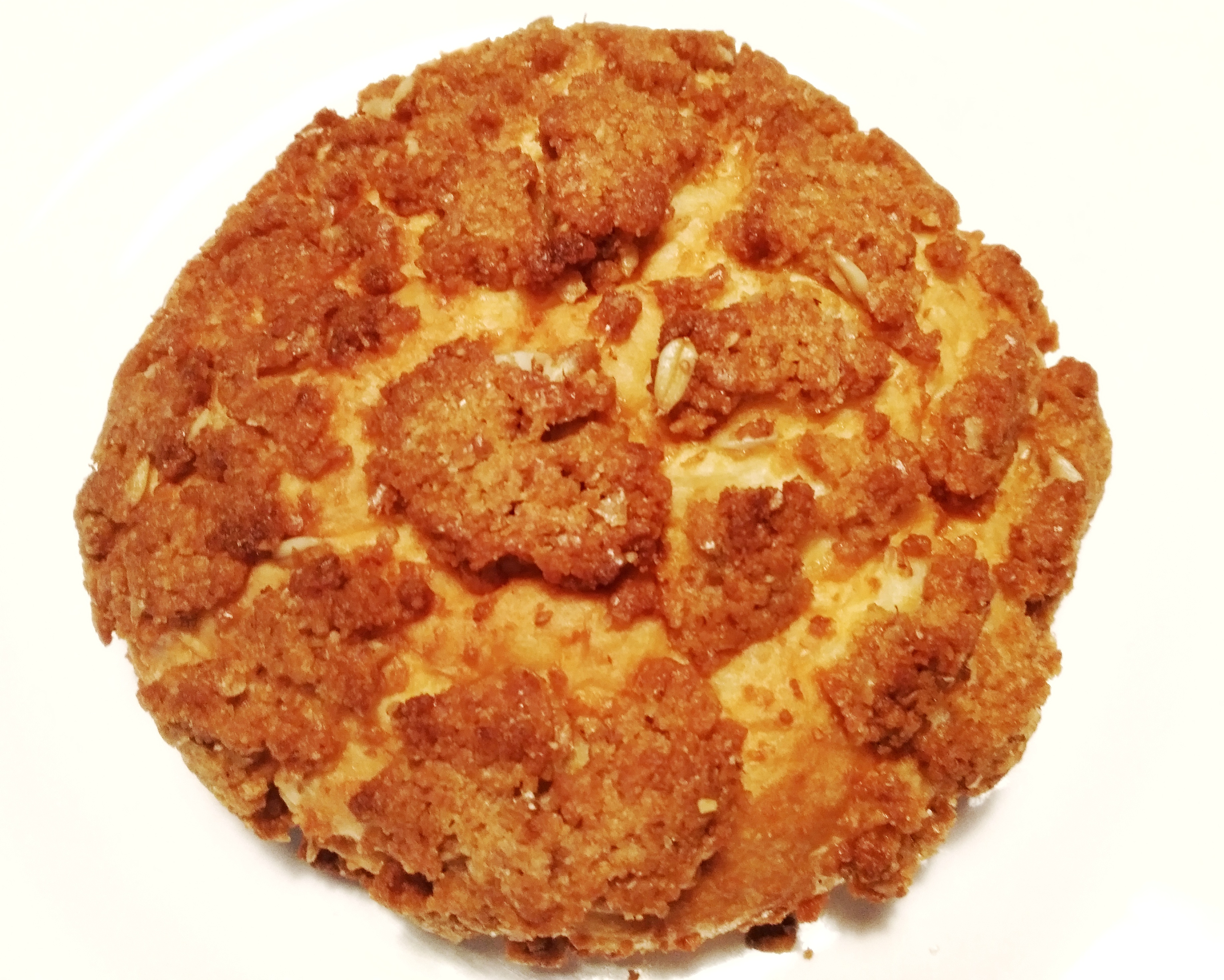
- Alternative names: Korean streusel bread, soboro bread, soboro pastry, soboro bun
- Type: Bread
- Place of origin: Korea
- Associated cuisine: Korean cuisine

Korean name
- Hangul: 곰보빵; 소보로빵
- RR: gomboppang; soboroppang
- MR: komboppang; soboroppang
- IPA: [kom.bo.p͈aŋ]; [so.bo.ɾo.p͈aŋ]

Soboro-ppang (Korean: 소보로빵), or gombo-ppang (곰보빵; standard language), often translated as soboro bread, soboro pastry, or soboro bun, and also known as Korean streusel bread, is a sweet bun with a streusel-like upper crust popular in Korea. The bun is made of flour, sugar, eggs, and dough and baked with a crisp, bumpy surface on top. The word "soboro" is a Japanese word which refers to the streusel topping of the bun, which is often made with peanut butter as a key ingredient. Soboro refers to fried and minced meat or fish in Japanese, which resembles the streusel on top of the bread.

== See also ==
- Sungsimdang
- Melonpan
- Pineapple bun
- Concha
- List of buns
