= Rotiboy =

Malaysian multinational bakery chain

Rotiboy Bakeshoppe Sdn Bhd
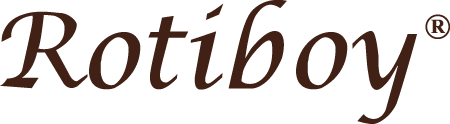
- Type: Private Limited Company
- Industry: Bakery
- Founded: April 1998; 28 years ago in Bukit Mertajam, Malaysia
- Founder: Hiro Tan
- Headquarters: Lot 159, Jalan Industri 2/2, Rawang Integrated Industrial Park,, Rawang, Malaysia
- Products: Bread, cakes and buns
- Website: www.rotiboy.com

Rotiboy is a Malaysian bakery chain based in Rawang, Selangor owned by Rotiboy Bakeshoppe Sdn Bhd. It is known for their signature coffee-flavoured crusted buns modified after the Mexican concha.

The company has more than 100 outlets in Malaysia, Indonesia, Thailand, South Korea, Saudi Arabia and the United Arab Emirates, as well planning to enter the Chinese market.

== History ==
The company was founded in April 1998 in Bukit Mertajam, Penang, with the name generated by accident when the founder's brother called his nephew, "naughty-boy" which sounds like "Rotiboy". In 2002, the company migrated to Wisma Central, Jalan Ampang, Kuala Lumpur. Rotiboy successfully expanded in Klang Valley, and in 2022, Rotiboy opened up its first franchise in East Malaysia in Kuching, Sarawak, followed by other cities in the region such as Sibu, Bintulu and Miri.

=== International expansion ===
In May 2004, Rotiboy International Pte Ltd was established in Singapore. Between 2004 and 2007, Rotiboy has expanded its operations to Singapore, Indonesia, Thailand and South Korea. In 2012, Rotiboy opens its stores in United Arab Emirates and Saudi Arabia.

In May 2025, Rotiboy opens its first store in Brunei.

== See also ==
- List of bakeries
- List of bakery cafés
