= Caffè Pascucci =

Italian coffeehouse chain

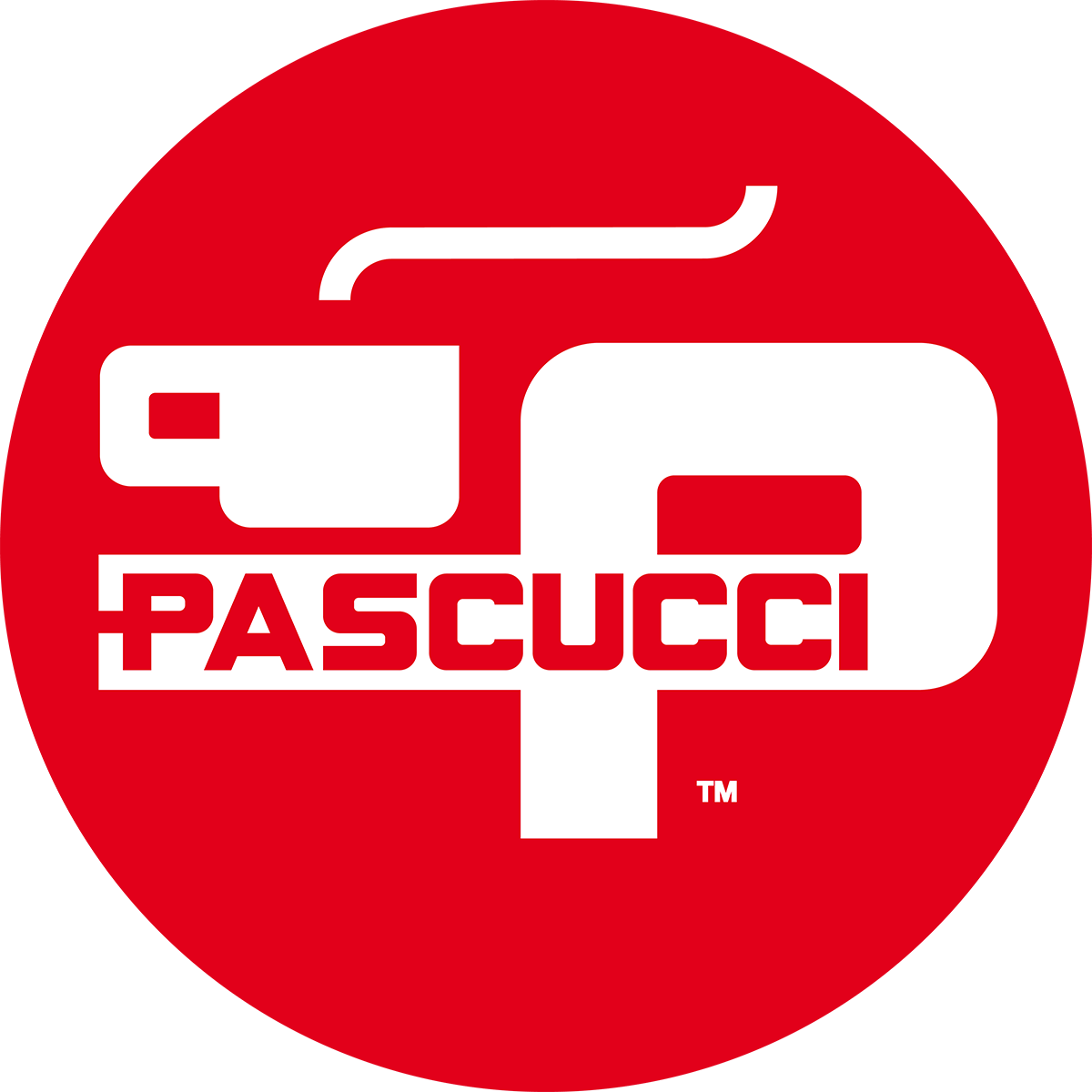

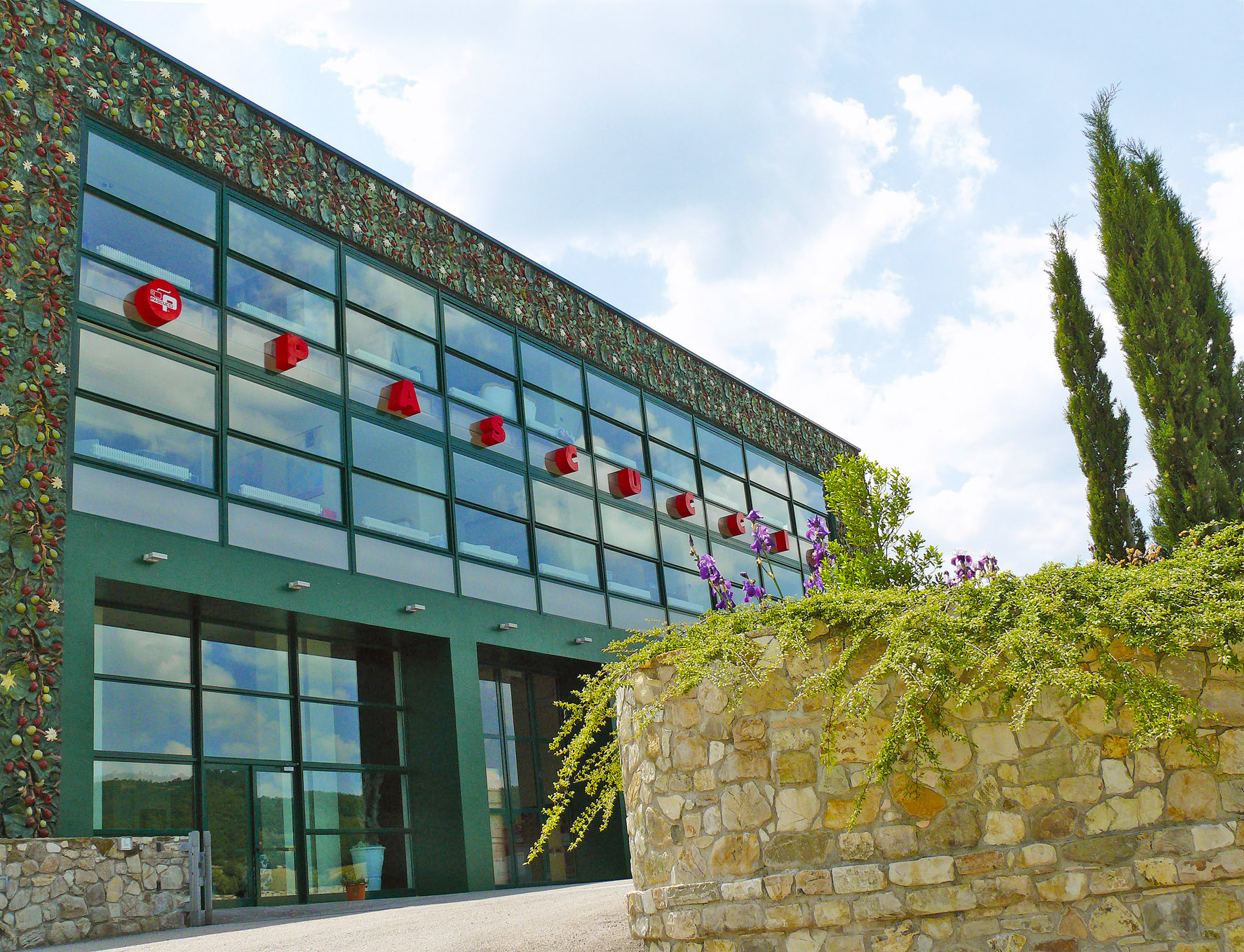
- Type: S.p.A.
- Industry: Coffee
- Founded: 1883; 143 years ago
- Founder: Antonio Pascucci
- Headquarters: Monte Cerignone, Italy
- Area served: Worldwide
- Products: Coffee
- Website: www.pascucci.it

Caffè Pascucci is an Italian coffeehouse chain, with branches in over 25 countries.

The company, Pascucci Torrefazione S.p.a., is headquartered in Monte Cerignone, Province of Pesaro and Urbino.

Caffè Pascucci is the principal sponsor of KF Teuta Durrës, a team of Albanian Superliga.

== Locations ==
- The first branch in the United States was opened in 2011.
- The locations in South Korea are currently run by SPC Group.

The outlets in Apgujeong-dong, Gangnam-gu in Seoul, South Korea was used as one of the main filming locations for Seoul Broadcasting System's 2001 drama Beautiful Days, starring Lee Byung-hun, Choi Ji-woo, Ryu Si-won, Shin Min-a, Lee Jung-hyun and Lee Yoo-jin.

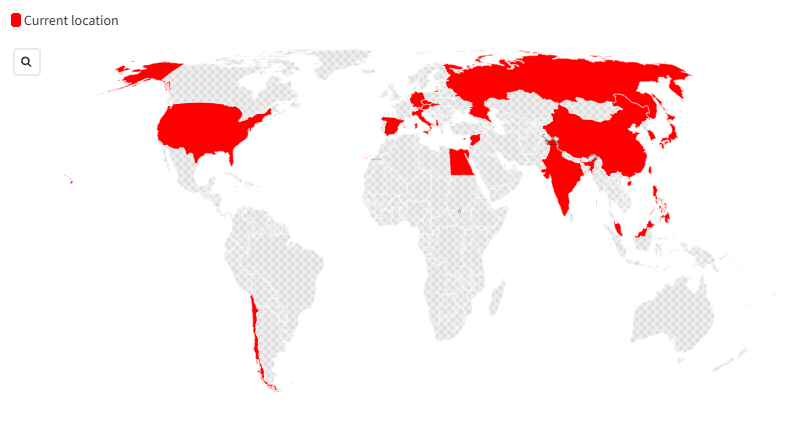
Cafe Pascucci Locations by their respective Countries

== See also ==
- List of coffeehouse chains
