= Sungsimdang =

Bakery in Daejeon, South Korea

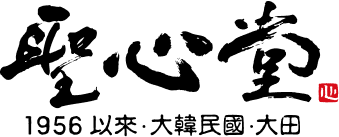

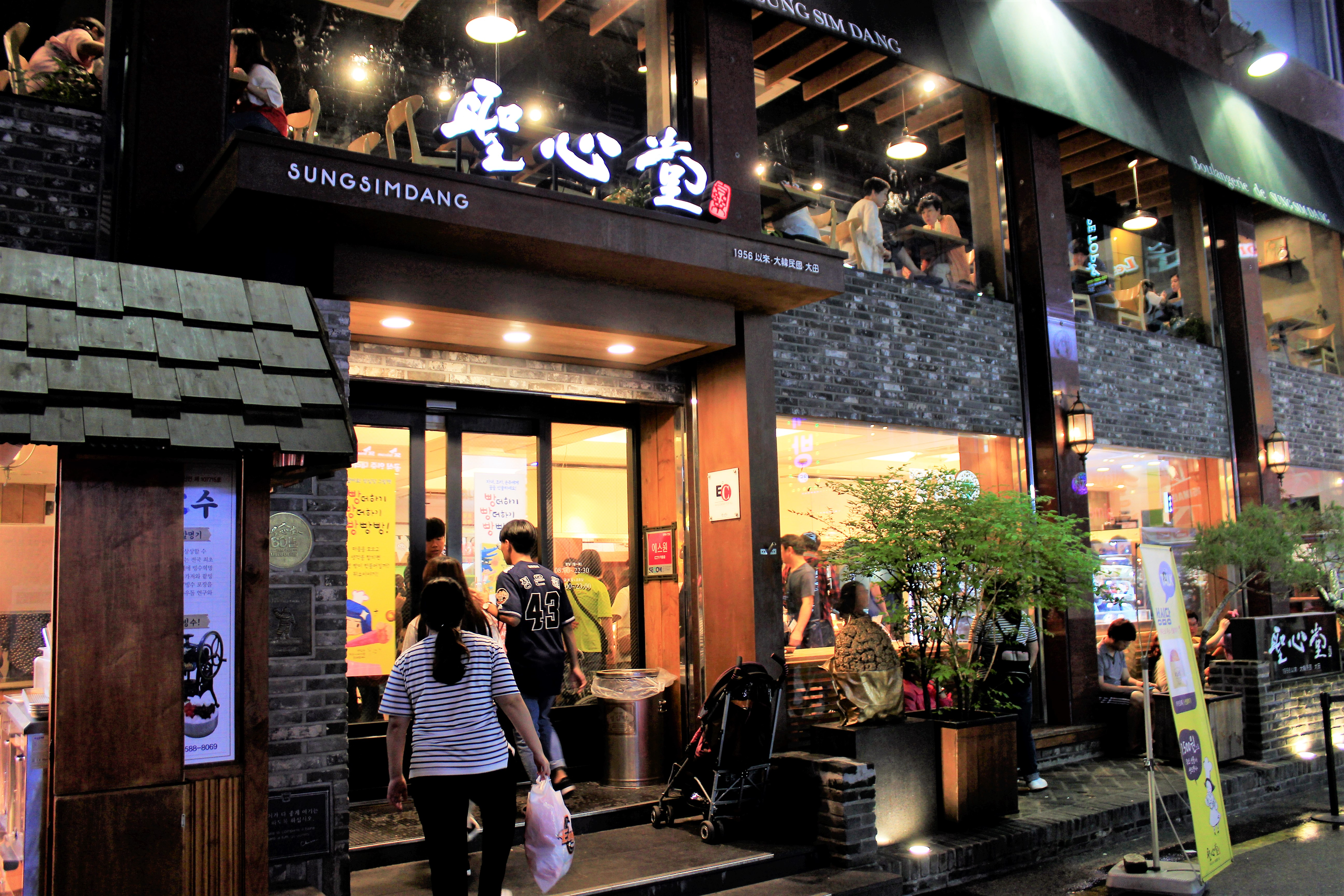
- Industry: Bakery
- Founder: Lim Gilsun
- Headquarters: 15 Daejong-ro 480beon-gil, Jung-gu, Daejeon, Korea
- Products: Soboro-ppang, chive bread
- Parent: Rosso Ltd.

Korean name
- Hangul: 성심당
- Hanja: 聖心堂
- Lit.: Sacred Heart Hall
- RR: Seongsimdang
- MR: Sŏngsimdang
- Website: www.sungsimdang.co.kr

Sungsimdang (Korean: 성심당; lit. 'Sacred Heart Hall') is a Western-style bakery in Daejeon, South Korea. It is most well known for soboro-ppang and chive bread. The small chain has been hailed as one of the best in the nation and is a representative brand of the city. Annual sales were KRW 53.2 billion in 2018.

== History ==
In December 1950, founder Lim Gil-soon and his family left Heungnam Pier on the ship SS Meredith Victory and settled on the island Geojedo. Lim boarded a train in 1956 to move his family to Seoul, but the train broke down at Daejeon Station and so the family remained in Daejeon. Lim and his family had nowhere to go, so they visited the Daeheung-dong Catholic Church near Daejeon Station and informed the priest of their situation. The priest gave them two bags of flour out of sympathy, and Lim started a steamed bun business with a "Sungsimdang" sign in front of Daejeon Station.

== Description ==
Founded in 1956 as Sungsimdang, the bakery was incorporated in 2001 as Rosso Ltd. under Lim Gilsun. After incorporation, the brand opened additional bakeries and restaurants within Daejeon. In 2012, the brand received patent 10-1104547 for their soboro-ppang recipe. Sungsimdang baked bread for Pope Francis during his visit to the peninsula in 2014. The following year, Gilsun was granted the Order of St. Gregory the Great as he had been donating bread to orphanages and nursing homes for decades.

Seongsimdang continued to grow, with annual sales reaching 40 billion won by 2015. In 2021, it topped the list of non-branded bakeries in the country, recording 63 billion won in sales. It recorded 80 billion won in sales in 2022 and surpassed the 100 billion won marker with 124.3 billion won in 2023.

The bakery is one of the most famous places in Daejeon and has been described as one of the three major bakeries in the country, holding first place for most sales for a non-franchised bakery. The bakery has been introduced in the Michelin Guide as a representative of local self-employment.

== Brands and Branches ==
=== Head office ===
Bread purchased at the Sacred Heart Hall on the first floor is free to eat at the terrace kitchen on the second floor.

- Address: Bangtong-dong, 1st floor, 15, Daejong-ro 480beon-gil, Jung-gu, Daejeon

=== Daejeon Station Branch ===
- Address: 2nd floor, 215 Jungang-ro, Dong-gu, Daejeon

=== Lotte Department Store Daejeon Branch ===
It is open from 8 am to 10 pm, independently from the department store. It sells items made exclusively for Lotte Department Store in Daejeon.

- Address: 598, Gyeryong-ro, Seo-gu, Daejeon, 1st floor (Goejeong-dong, Lotte Department Store Daejeon Branch)

=== DCC Branch ===
It is the newest branch, opening to the public in November 2023.

- Address: 107, Expo-ro, Yuseong-gu, Daejeon, 1st floor (Doryong-dong, Daejeon Convention Center)

Sungsimdang also has imprints throughout Daejeon including Cake Boutique, Old Taste, Café, Restaurant (Terras Kitchen, Flying Pan, Udonya, Piatto), Cultural Center, and Ovenstory.

== See also ==
- Tous les Jours
- Paris Baguette
