= Café de cebada =

Café de cebada (Spanish for 'coffee of barley') may, depending on region, refer to:

- Caffé d'orzo, an espresso-like coffee substitute
- Barley tea, a much lighter tisane (herbal tea) than caffé d'orzo
