= Nechezol =

Coffee substitute

Various brands of nechezol in communist-era Romania, officially labeled cafea cu înlocuitori

Nechezol was an ironic name for various Romanian coffee substitutes officially called cafea cu înlocuitori (coffee with substitutes), imposed on the market in the last years of communism in Romania.

Coffee had virtually disappeared from Romanian stores in the 1980s (but was still available in Comturist hard-currency luxury shops and on the black market), with the drastic limitation of imports intended to reduce Romania's external debt. Nechezol contained only one-fifth coffee, the balance typically consisting of barley, oats, chickpeas and chestnuts. Its pejorative nickname is derived from the verb a necheza (to neigh), alluding to the oats (usually fed to horses), with the chemical suffix -ol giving a pseudoscientific touch alluding to Elena Ceaușescu, "world-renowned scientist" and wife of dictator Nicolae Ceaușescu.

It was speculated that Nechezol contained no caffeine.

== See also ==
- East German coffee crisis

== See also ==
- Cereal coffee
- Postum
