= German language in East Germany =

The German language developed differently in East Germany during its existence as a separate state from 1949 to 1990, from the German of West Germany because of significant differences in the country's political and socio-cultural environment. Additionally, from the late 1960s onwards the political leaders of the DDR were intent on affirming the independence of their state by "isolationist linguistic politics" with the objective of demarcating East Germany from West Germany by actively reducing the unity of the German language.

This political effort did not amount to the creation of a new language in the DDR but brought about a particular usage of the language and of linguistic behaviours specific to it, felt not in syntax or grammar, but in vocabulary, and manifesting itself in both the official and non-official spheres.

== Vocabulary ==
The most prominent changes in the German language in the DDR were at the level of vocabulary. Most of the differences in DDR vocabulary were a result of the East German government attempting to construct a new socialist lexicon that would help to create and develop a new socialist identity in the DDR. An example of a word that was changed to promote a new socialist identity was the change from the word for flag from Fahne to Winkelement, meaning "waving element." The idea behind this change was to encourage people to wave flags that authorities would hand out to them before parades and other events to signify East German pride. Another word that was created to promote a new socialist identity was to change the word for cow ('Kuh') to Großvieheinheit meaning "large livestock unit." Communist agricultural planners made this change to show that a socialist cow was different, and something special compared to a capitalist cow.

The government of the DDR and its organizations controlled many aspects of everyday life and created new words to express themselves. Words such as der Staatsrat (the governing body of the DDR), der Staatsratsvorsitzende (the chief executive of the governing body), and die Volkskammer (the one legislative body in the DDR) were created for the new governing body.

Economic, political, and social changes in the DDR as well as the total reorganization of government, industrial, and employment systems resulted in new words and compounds being developed. Words such as Betriebspaß ("the general characteristics of a factory in regard to its technical and economic state") and kollektivieren (the verb used for the action of nationalizing land) were established and given meanings to activities specific to the East German government.

As the new nation was developing, so were new words to fill in the gaps of DDR society. An example of this would be Intershop which was the word for a store that exchanged foreign currencies for western goods. Hausbuch was the book each residential block kept to enter residents' and visitors' details and to document visitors from West Germany, which was checked regularly by East German police, and Westpaket was the word for care packages that were sent to East Germany from the West.

In addition to creating new words, words that previously had existed were given new meanings (or modified slightly) to reflect the values of the DDR. Das Aktiv was "a group of workers which strives collectively to fulfill socio-political economic and cultural tasks and strives for above average achievements." Der Arbeiterstudent was created to describe a student who was previously a manual worker before deciding to study.

One of the things GDR did was to promote words from the local dialects of Mitteldeutschland region that encompass the GDR. For example, the local dialectal word for Saturday, Sonnabend, was made the official standard word instead the standard German word, Samstag. The Berliner word for bread roll, Schrippen was used in lieu of standard Brötchen. Also, the German was influenced by cultured connections to Eastern Bloc, such as Datscha from the Russian "дача" (dacha), for summer house.

== Pronunciation and grammar ==
Linguists in East Germany focused on the norms of pronunciation rather than grammar. In 1961, the Wörterbuch der deutschen Aussprache (Dictionary of German Pronunciation), a separate dictionary focused on pronunciation, was created in East Germany. Meanwhile in West Germany, two distinct pronunciation dictionaries were created, Theodor Siebs' Deutsche Aussprache and Konrad Duden's Aussprachewörterbuch, part of the Duden, which furthered linguistic and pronunciation differences in the DDR. Siebs' Deutsche Aussprache aimed to provide an ideal pronunciation standard that focused on uniformity and rules whereas Duden's Aussprachewörterbuch provided pronunciation differences that focused on documenting actual usage. No corresponding dictionaries or books focusing on grammar were produced in East Germany, and grammar trends taking place during this period were documented as occurring in both East and West Germany.

== Examples ==
- Führerschein (driver's licence) – Fahrerlaubnis (Replacement of the word Führer)
- Handelsorganisation, HO – state retail business
- Intershop – hard currency (later also Forum checks) retail store
- Kader – personnel
- Kommerzielle Koordinierung, KoKo – secret commercial enterprise
- Nichtsozialistisches Wirtschaftsgebiet (NSW) - Non-socialist economic area which were countries that were not a member of Comecon
- Partei – Socialist Unity Party of Germany
- Plattenbau – large panel system-building
- Stasi – state security service
- Westpaket – parcel from West Germany
- Winkelement – small flag
- der antifaschistische Schutzwall – Berlin Wall
- Kollektiv – work team
- Tal der Ahnungslosen (lit. "Valley of the Clueless") – two regions not able to receive TV programming from West Germany
- Broiler – Western 'Brathähnchen'
- Blaue Fliesen, blaue Kacheln – Deutsche Mark (West German "hard" convertible currency, especially the 100 DM note)

== See also ==
- Cyrillization of German
- German dialects
- North–South differences in the Korean language

== Bibliography ==
=== In German ===
- Frank Thomas Grub: „Wende“ und „Einheit“ im Spiegel der deutschsprachigen Literatur. Ein Handbuch. Band 1: Untersuchungen. De Gruyter, Berlin and New York 2003 ISBN 3110177757
- Hugo Moser: Sprachliche Folgen der politischen Teilung Deutschlands. Beihefte zum „Wirkenden Wort“ 3. Schwann, Düsseldorf 1962
- Michael Kinne, Birgit Strube-Edelmann: Kleines Wörterbuch des DDR-Wortschatzes (2nd edn). Schwann, Düsseldorf 1981 ISBN 3590155094
- Martin Ahrends (ed.): Trabbi, Telespargel und Tränenpavillon – Das Wörterbuch der DDR-Sprache. Heyne, München 1986 ISBN 3453023579
- Wolf Oschlies: Würgende und wirkende Wörter – Deutschsprechen in der DDR. Holzapfel, Berlin 1989 ISBN 3921226341
- Margot Heinemann: Kleines Wörterbuch der Jugendsprache. Bibliographisches Institut, Leipzig 1990 ISBN 3323002733
- Manfred W. Hellmann: Divergenz und Konvergenz – Sprachlich-kommunikative Folgen der staatlichen Trennung und Vereinigung Deutschlands. In: Karin Eichhoff-Cyrus, Rudolf Hoberg (ed.): Die deutsche Sprache zur Jahrtausendwende – Sprachkultur oder Sprachverfall. Duden-Reihe Thema Deutsch, Band 1. Mannheim (Duden-Redaktion) and Wiesbaden (GfdS) 2000, pp. 247–275
- Marianne Schröder, Ulla Fix: Allgemeinwortschatz der DDR-Bürger – nach Sachgruppen geordnet und linguistisch kommentiert. Heidelberg 1997
- Birgit Wolf: Sprache in der DDR. Ein Wörterbuch. de Gruyter, Berlin und New York 2000 ISBN 3110164272. online bei Google-Books
- Jan Eik: DDR-Deutsch: eine entschwundene Sprache. Jaron, Berlin 2010 ISBN 9783897736450
- Norbert Nail: Jenseits des „breiten Steins“: Studentendeutsch in der DDR. In: Studenten-Kurier 3/2013, pp. 15–17
- Antje Baumann: Mit der Schwalbe zur Datsche. Wörter aus einem verschwundenen Land. Bibliographisches Institut – Duden, Berlin, 2020 ISBN 9783411745326

=== In English ===
- Russ, C. (2002). The German language today: A linguistic introduction. Routledge. (See Chapter 5 German in East Germany)
- Stevenson, P. (2002). Language and German disunity: a sociolinguistic history of East and West in Germany, 1945–2000. Oxford University Press
