= Orzo (disambiguation) =

Orzo is a rice-shaped pasta also known as risoni.

Orzo may also refer to:

- Orzo, the Italian name for the cereal grain barley (Hordeum vulgare); sometimes encountered in English-language works on Italian cuisine
- Caffè d'orzo ('coffee of barley'), a roasted grain beverage, often simply called "orzo" in Europe
