= Ersatz good =

Low quality substitute good

An ersatz good (UK: /ˈɛərzæts/ AIR-zats, US: /ˈɛərzɑːts/ AIR-zahts, both also /ˈɜːr-/ UR-) is a substitute good, especially one that is considered inferior to the good it replaces. The phrase has particular connotations of wartime usage.

== Etymology ==
Ersatz (German: [ɛʁˈzats]) is a German noun meaning 'substitute' or 'replacement'; in English, however, it is used as an adjective. In German orthography, noun phrases formed are usually represented as a single word, forming compound nouns such as Ersatzteile ("spare parts") or Ersatzspieler ("substitute player"). While ersatz in English generally means that the substitution is of unsatisfactory or inferior quality compared with the "real thing", in German, there is no such implication: e.g., Ersatzteile 'spare parts' is a technical expression without any implication about quality, Kaffeeersatz 'coffee substitute' is a drink from something other than coffee beans, and Ersatzzug 'replacement train' performs a comparable service. The term for inferior substitute in German would be Surrogat, which is cognate to the English word "surrogate".

== Historical examples ==
=== World War I ===
In the opening months of World War I, replacement troops for battle-depleted German infantry units were drawn from lesser-trained Ersatz Corps, which were less effective than the troops they replaced.

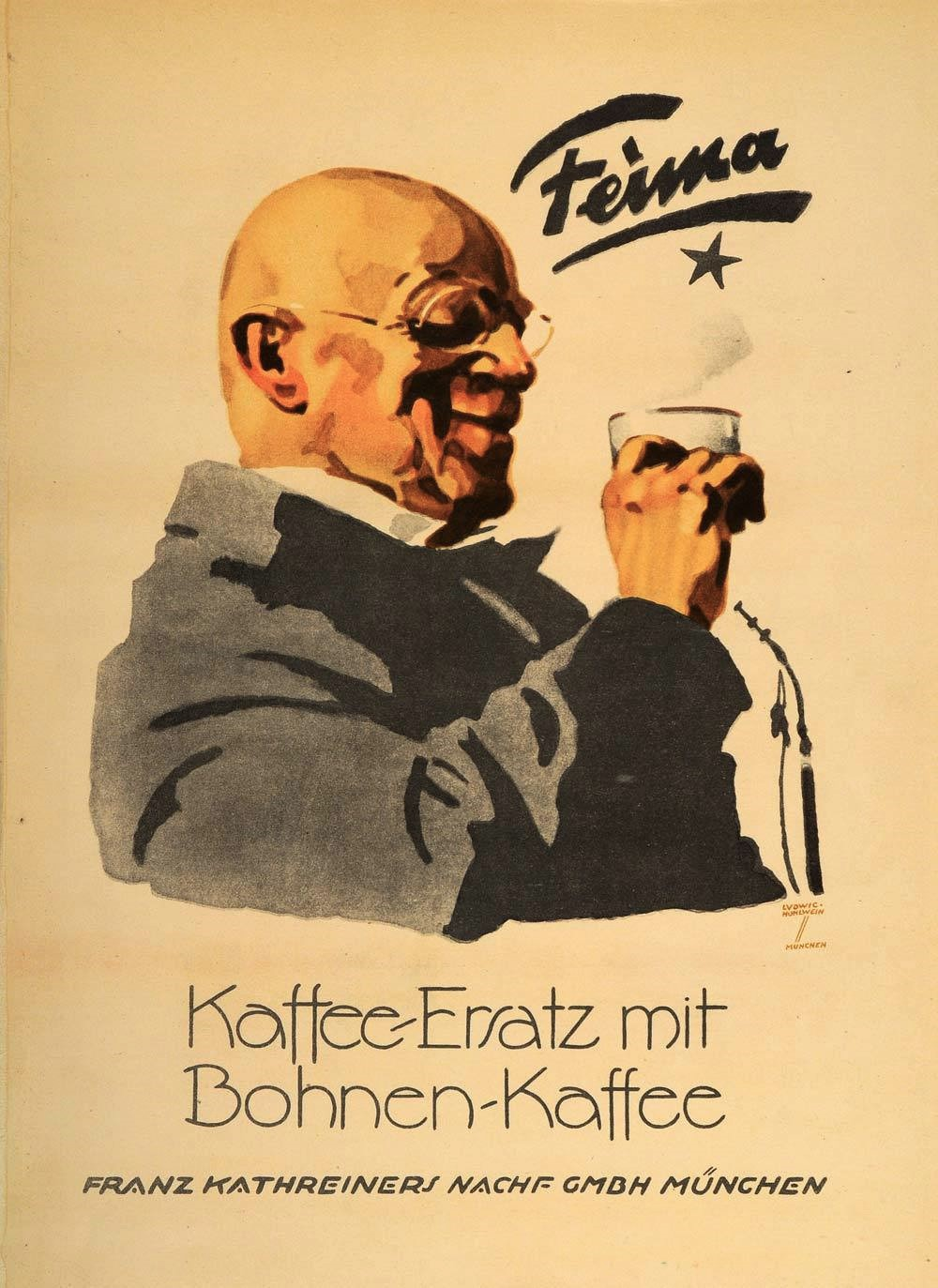
Advertisement for ersatz coffee (containing some coffee beans) in 1926

Another example of the word's usage in Germany exists in the German naval construction programs at the beginning of the 20th century. In this context, the phrasing "Ersatz [ship name]" indicates that a new, larger or more capable ship was a replacement for an ageing or lost vessel. German practice was not to reveal the name of a new ship until its launch; the ship would be known as "Ersatz [ship name]" throughout its construction. At the end of World War I, the last three ships of the planned Mackensen class of battlecruisers were redesigned and initially known simply as the Ersatz Yorck class, since the first ship was considered to be a replacement for the lost armored cruiser Yorck.

The Allied naval blockade of Germany limited maritime commerce with Germany, forcing Germany and Austria-Hungary to develop substitutes for products such as chemical compounds and provisions. More than 11,000 ersatz products were sold in Germany during the war. Patents for ersatz products were granted for 6000 varieties of beer, wine and lemonade; 1000 kinds of soup cubes; 837 types of sausage and 511 assortments of coffee.

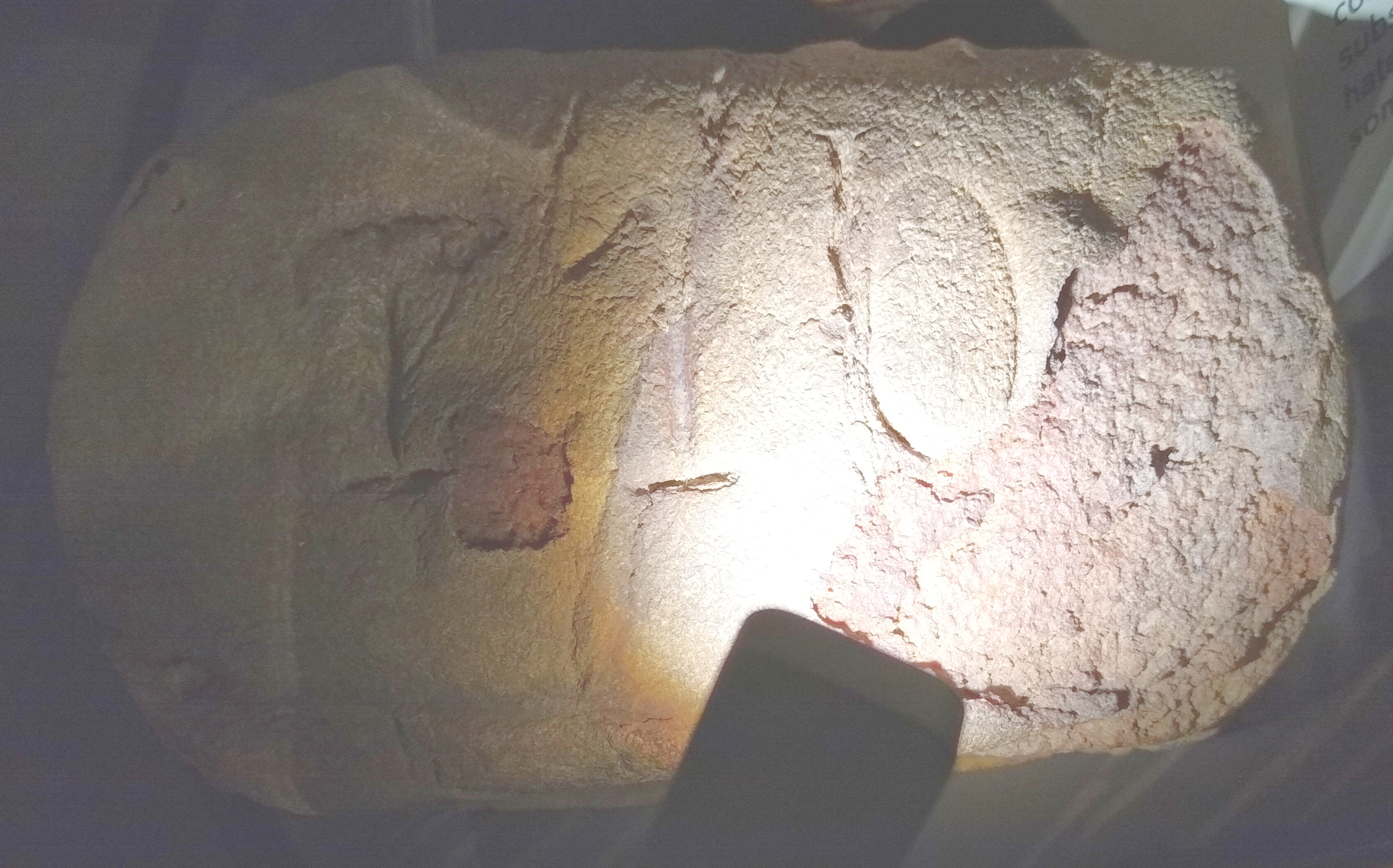
Ersatz bread from World War I on display at the Imperial War Museum in London. It is an extreme example of an Ersatz good, estimated to actually only be 20% bread.

Ersatz products developed in Germany and Austria-Hungary during this time included:

- synthetic rubber Kautschuk produced from petroleum for rubber
- benzene for heating oil (coal gas)
- industrial lubricants made by extracting oils from coal tar and brown-coal slags
- synthetic camphor for imported natural camphor
- nitrate crepe paper made from cellulose for gun cotton
- glycerin from sugar rather than fats
- gypsum-yielded sulphur
- pigeon guano used to make fertilizer
- flowers and weeds processed to make alcohol for ammunition
- rosins and gums extracted from coal derivatives
- tea composed of roasted barley, grasses, wild flowers, ground raspberry leaves or catnip
- coffee substitute using roasted acorns, chicory and beechnuts (stretched with caramel-flavoured raw sugar and beet flower later in the war)
- butter replaced by curdled milk, sugar and food colouring
- cooking oil replaced by a mixture of beets, carrots, turnips and spices
- salad oil was 99% mucilage
- eggs replaced by yellow-coloured corn or potato flour
- ground European beetles (cockchafers) and linden wood replaced fats
- sausage made of water, plant fibres, animal scraps and blood (the infamous 'war sausage' which was equated to 'a mouthful of sawdust')
- bouillon cubes made 70–90% of salt rather than meat extract
- wheat flour stretched by adding potato flour and powdered hay
- chocolates and cocoa replaced by ground cocoa shells and mixed pure pepper
- oil and sunflower 'cakes' replaced corn and oats as horse feed
- rapeseed, poppy and mustard 'cakes' replaced green feed for cattle
- paper, peat, reeds, bulrushes and free-growing stinging nettle fibres replaced cotton in textiles
- wood and paper used for shoe soles

Germany also stretched its supply of petrol with 'gasohol' (Benzolspiritus), which by today's standards would be classed as E25 petrol, consisting of 75% petrol and 25% distilled alcohol, likely ethanol.

=== World War II ===
In World War II, Ersatzbrot (substitute bread) made of potato starch, frequently stretched with extenders such as sawdust, was furnished to soldiers as Kommissbrot, a dark German bread baked from rye and other flours used for military rations, and also to prisoners of war. One recipe reportedly discovered in the "Food Providing Ministry" (Reichsnährstand) in Berlin, labeled "(Top Secret) Berlin 24.X1 1941", contained 50% bruised rye grain, 20% sliced sugar beets, 20% "tree flour" (sawdust), and 10% minced leaves and straw.

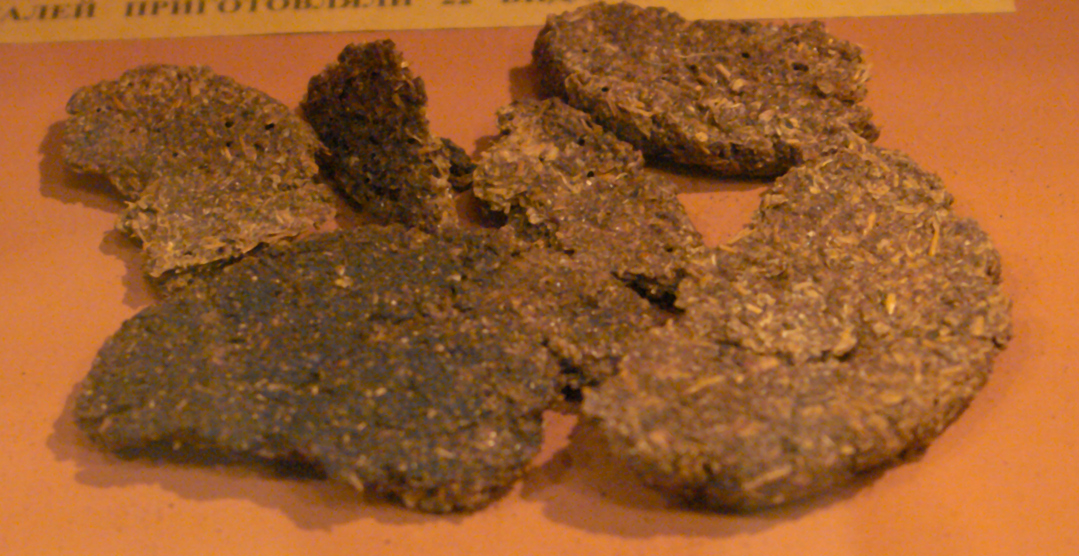
Ersatz food from the siege of Leningrad, made from goose-foot seed and bran, and fried in mineral oil

During the siege of Leningrad, its citizens were given ersatz flour instead of actual wheat flour (of which there was an extremely limited supply then) by the Soviet authorities. The lack of proper food with any nutrition meant that the city residents not only starved but became vulnerable to deadly illnesses and diseases (such as dysentery) owing to their weakened physical conditions. As a result, the word ersatz entered as a pejorative into Russian and other Slavic languages.

In Britain, this was additionally popularised as an adjective from the experiences of thousands of U.S., British, and other English-speaking combat personnel, primarily airmen, who were captured in the European Theater of Operations during World War II. These Allied prisoners of war were given ersatz goods such as Ersatzkaffee, an inferior Getreidekaffee or "grain coffee" as a coffee substitute by their German captors.

=== Eastern Bloc ===
In the Eastern Bloc, many agricultural goods could not be produced domestically, such as tea, coffee, nuts, and citrus fruits. These were generally imported from abroad with scarce foreign currency reserves, or inferior substitutes were produced domestically. In 1977, the East German coffee crisis resulted in the introduction of many coffee substitutes, which were generally rejected by the population. Replacements for orangeat and succade were made from candied carrot and unripe tomatoes.

=== Other ===
A study of conditions in the Southern United States during the American Civil War is called Ersatz in the Confederacy.

== Effectiveness ==
When presented with a choice of ersatz, one tends to prefer the generic version of the brand rather than an entirely different product. Specifically one that most closely resembles the original and meets the same goal.

For instance, a person who desires a gourmet chocolate is more likely to choose another, less expensive chocolate as a substitute than a different kind of dessert or snack. Because such "within-category" substitutes are easier to compare to the desired good, however, those that are inferior are less effective than "cross-category" substitutes that fulfill the same goal. People are more able to notice their inferiority during consumption, which leads them to be less satisfying than goal-derived substitutes from different taxonomic categories.

During the First World War in Germany and Austria-Hungary, people succumbed to sickness from the consumption of ersatz goods. In Austria, the term "Vienna sickness" was coined after malnutrition from such goods was linked to a cause of the tuberculosis epidemic (10,000 reported cases).

In Germany, Princess Blücher suffered from influenza in 1916, suggesting that she was suffering from "ersatz illness". She writes: "everyone is feeling ill from too many chemicals in the hotel food. I don't believe that Germany will ever be starved out, but she will be poisoned out first with these substitutes."

== See also ==
- Adulterant
- Austerity
- Backstop resources
- Claytons, a word used in Australian and New Zealand English
- Counterfeit
- Giffen good, a good for which there is no ersatz replacement, causing demand to rise with prices
