= Eduard Paulig =

Eduard Paulig (19 March 1889 – 20 April 1953) was a Finnish businessman and industrialist. As the son of Gustav Paulig, founder of the Finnish food company Paulig, he took over the family business and transformed it from a traditional trading company into a modern food industry enterprise specialising in branded products. Under his leadership, the company's market share grew from six to over 20 percent, and Paulig became the largest coffee importer in the Nordic countries. He was awarded the honorary title of kommerseråd (Commercial Counsellor) in 1939 and has often been called "the coffee king of Finland".

== Background of the family business ==
Gustav Paulig, the son of a gardener from Lübeck, arrived in Finland in 1871 and in 1876 founded his own trading company with the support of Commercial Counsellor Paul Sinebrychoff. Coffee was the company's primary product from the outset, alongside sugar, dried fruit, spices, and flour. In 1904, Gustav Paulig established a coffee roastery — the first of industrial scale in Finland — though unroasted coffee long dominated sales.

== Education and early career ==
Eduard Paulig began working in the family business at the age of seventeen in 1906. In keeping with the custom of the time, he was sent abroad for practical commercial training, including a period at the colonial goods wholesaler Boye & Schweighoffer in Lübeck. To deepen his knowledge of the grain trade and international commerce, he also spent time in Russia, working at the offices of the large milling company J. E. Bashkirov in Nizhny Novgorod. On returning to Finland, he worked as a travelling salesman for the family firm.

== Taking over the company ==
After Gustav Paulig's unexpected death in 1907, ownership of the company passed to his widow, Bertha Paulig. Eduard Paulig gradually assumed a leading role and was appointed prokura holder (an authorised signatory under Nordic commercial law) in 1916. In 1912 he had married Ellen Ingeborg Sofia Riska, a union that would later prove significant when her brother Hugo Riska took on a senior role in the company. In 1919 the firm was converted into a limited company, with Eduard Paulig as managing director and chairman of the board. During the 1920s he bought out his siblings — originally six in number, one of whom, the infantry captain Bertel Paulig, had been killed in 1918 during the Finnish Civil War — and reorganised the business as a limited partnership. In 1931 his brother-in-law Hugo Riska became managing director, a position Eduard Paulig resumed after Riska's death before handing it over to his son Henrik Paulig in 1947. In connection with this generational transition, the company was reconverted into a limited company in 1950.

== Development of Paulig ==
Under Eduard Paulig's leadership, Paulig became the dominant player in the Finnish coffee market and by 1938 the largest coffee importer in the Nordic countries.

A key innovation was the introduction of roasted and pre-packaged coffee for the consumer market. Coffee had previously been sold in five- and ten-kilogram packages under the Paulig name, but in 1924 the company began selling roasted coffee in half- and quarter-kilogram packages, firmly establishing coffee as a branded product. The oldest of the company's current coffee brands date from 1929. At the same time, packages began to carry date markings, reinforcing consumer confidence in the product's freshness and quality.

Eduard Paulig also broadened the company's activities in spices, tea — introduced in consumer packaging from 1933 — and dried fruit. In 1938, Paulig's market position in dried fruit was in fact stronger than its position in coffee. Sales of bulk commodities such as flour and sugar gave way to specialised and processed products.

== Wartime and new areas of activity ==
Both World War I and World War II severely disrupted Paulig's operations through import restrictions. During these periods the company developed and sold coffee substitutes and coffee blends with little or no actual coffee content. It was not until 1948 that sales of real coffee again exceeded those of substitute products.

During World War II, Eduard Paulig invested in deep-freezing technology, introducing frozen foods to the Finnish market. Production began in 1942 using German technology to supply the Finnish armed forces, and expanded to civilian consumers in 1944; Paulig continued to manufacture frozen products until 1987. The company also began producing ice cream in 1949. During the war years, hot-air drying was introduced for preserving vegetables, a technique used until 1949.

== Sales organisation and marketing ==
Eduard Paulig established direct trading contacts with coffee-producing countries and travelled to South, Central, and North America, including trips in 1927 and 1949. In Finland he built up an efficient nationwide wholesale organisation during the 1920s and 1930s. For the retail trade, the company developed the Nissen chain of shops and cafés, acquired in 1909 and closed in 1945.

During his tenure, the Paula Girl was introduced in 1950, a marketing concept brought back from an American trip by his son Henrik Paulig. Dressed in a Finnish folk costume and carrying a gleaming copper coffee pot, she travelled the country promoting Paulig's coffee, and her image also appeared on coffee packages.

== Later years ==
Eduard Paulig served as chairman of the board of Paulig until his death in 1953. Under his leadership the company underwent a decisive transformation from a trading house into a food industry enterprise focused on branded goods, and the direction he established continued to shape the company's development under his son and successor Henrik Paulig. Eduard Paulig is regarded as one of the most influential figures in the Finnish food industry in the first half of the twentieth century.
