= Barleycup =

Instant cereal drink

Barleycup is an instant cereal drink, available in the United Kingdom, Ireland, Norway, Sweden, Denmark, Malta and Hong Kong. Barleycup was manufactured by the British company Ridpath Pek Ltd., until it was acquired in 2004 by the American firm Smithfield Foods Inc. and merged with Norwich Food Company Ltd. to form Smithfield Foods Ltd. UK. In 2013 the Barleycup brand was purchased by “Grana” Sp. z o.o., the company that had earlier been the manufacturer of beverages produced under this brand. The packaging and labels were modified in the same year.

A new product was marketed in 2014 – Barleycup with Dandelion. As of 2015, the following brand products were available on the British market: Barleycup powder 100g, Barleycup powder 200g, Barleycup granules 200g, Barleycup Organic 100g, Barleycup with Dandelion 100g.

Barleycup's ingredients are roasted barley, rye, and chicory, plus, in the case of Barleycup with Dandelion, dandelion root and sugar beet. These beverages do not contain any artificial additives, lactose or dextrose. Thanks to its taste and appearance, Barleycup is considered to be a caffeine-free alternative to coffee.

== Nutritional information ==
Nutritional information per 100g, Barleycup powder
Energy	1430 kJ / 339kcal
Protein	3.9 g
Carbohydrate	72 g
of which sugars	15 g
Fat	0.1 g
of which saturates	0.1 g

== See also ==
- Caffè d'orzo
- Caro
- Inka
- List of barley-based beverages
- Postum
- Roasted barley tea
