= Barley water =

Infusion of barley grains in water

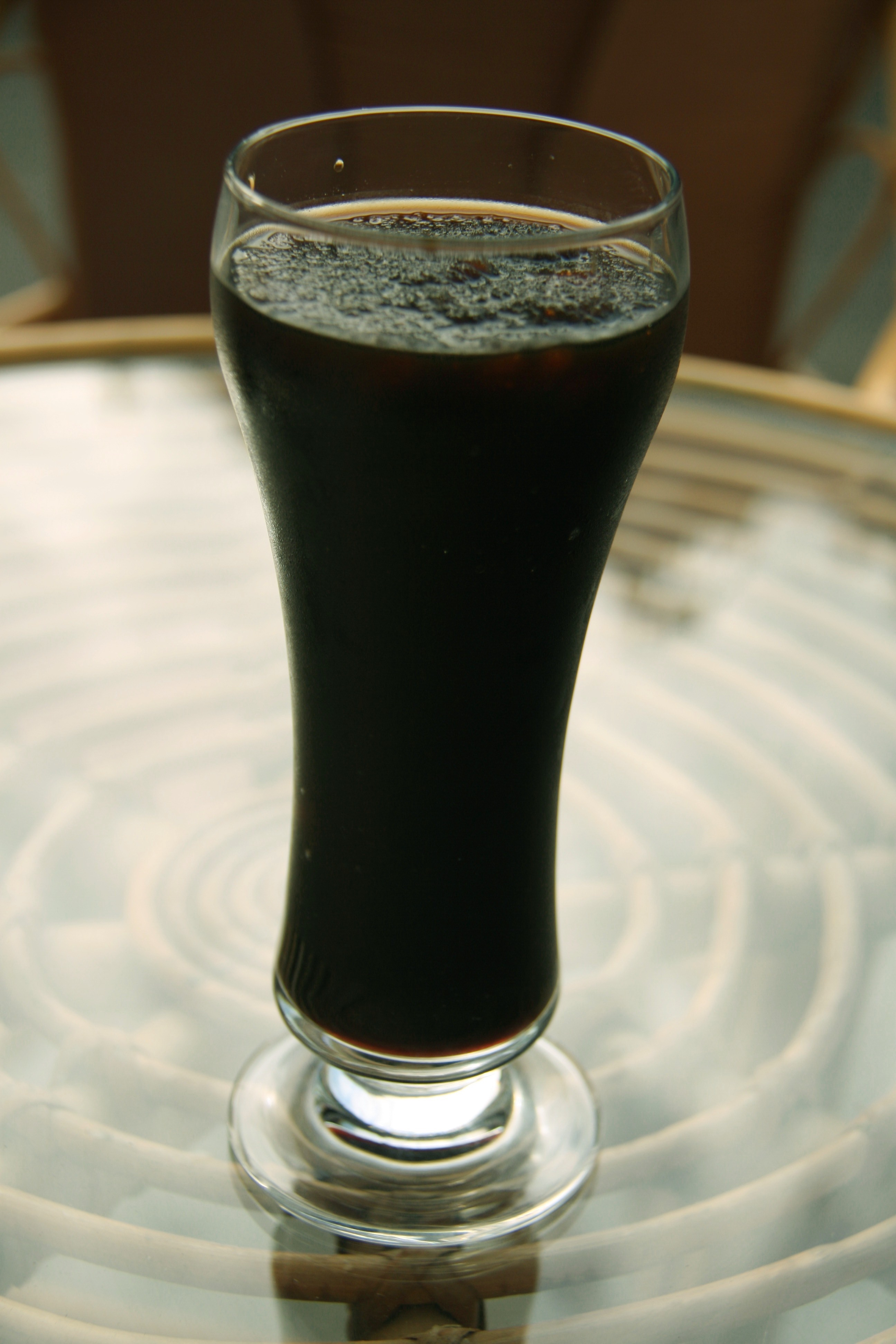
- Spanish barley water – agua de cebada
- Ingredients: barley, water, flavourings

Barley water is a traditional drink consumed in various parts of the world. It is made by boiling barley grains in water, then (usually) straining to remove the grains, and possibly adding other ingredients such as sugar.

== Variations ==
- Kykeon (κυκεών, from Ancient Greek: κυκάω, romanized: kykaō, lit. 'to stir, to mix') was a drink made mainly of water, barley and naturally occurring substances. It was used at the climax of the Eleusinian Mysteries to break a sacred fast, but it was also a favourite drink of Greek peasants.
- Agua de cebada, in Spanish-speaking countries, is made with malted barley, sugar and lemon. In El Salvador, however, this name is used to refer to a different drink that is bright pink and is now made with wheat or rice instead of the original barley.
- The British version is made by boiling washed pearl barley, straining, and adding fruit juice, typically lemon, and sugar to taste. The fruit rind may also be boiled with the barley. The Robinsons brand of the drink was the official supplier to the Wimbledon tennis tournament and sponsored the event for over 80 years until 2022.
- East Asian and Southeast Asian versions are typically not strained and may be consumed hot or cold, with or without lime. These kinds of barley water generally include the strained grain within the drink. Hot barley water is often served with a spoon and cold barley water with a straw so that the soft-boiled grains can be eaten.
- Roasted barley tea is a popular East Asian drink. The roasted barley is strained and removed before drinking.
- It is a popular drink in India. It is called jau ka sattu in Punjabi.

Barley water has been used as a first baby food, before feeding with barley mush. It is also used as a home treatment that allegedly cures cystitis.

== Nutrition ==
The following nutritional tables are from an analysis performed on a British-style barley water recipe. Nutrients listed are for one serving of 299g. Prepared from pearl barley, lemon juice and honey, it contains 11 grams of honey and the juice of a quarter of a lemon, per serve. The proportion of major nutrients was found to be: carbohydrates, 89%; fats, 3%; protein, 8%. This version of barley water was analysed as a "good" source of fibre and vitamin C.

Nutrient analysis: major nutrients
Nutrient	Value	% DV*
Calories	125.6	
Calories from fat (2.8%)	3.5	
Water	237g	
Sodium	3.5mg	1%
Potassium	114.6mg	3%
Protein	2.8g	
Carbohydrates	31.1g	
Net carbs	25.9g	
Fibre	5.2g	21%
*Note: Percent daily values (% DV) are based on; a 2,000-calorie diet. Percentage values will differ, according to calorie requirements and intake.

Nutrient analysis: Sugars
Nutrient	Value
Sugar	8.9g
Glucose	3.8g
Fructose	4.3g
Maltose	0.1g
Galactose	0.3g
Sucrose	0.1g

Nutrient analysis: Fats
Nutrient	Value
Total fat	0.4g
Saturated fat	0.1g
Monounsaturated fat	0g
Polyunsaturated fat	0.2g

Nutrient analysis: Vitamins and minerals
Nutrient	Value	% DV*
Vitamin A	0.8μg (13.6IU)	1%
Vitamin B6	0.1mg	7%
Vitamin B12	0μg	0%
Vitamin C	20.9mg	35%
Vitamin D	0μg	0%
Vitamin D2	0μg	
Vitamin D3	0μg	
Vitamin E	0mg	0%
Vitamin K	0.5μg	
Calcium	24.3mg	3%
Iron	0.8mg	11%
Magnesium	23.2mg	7%
Phosphorus	59.7mg	6%
Zinc	0.6mg	4%
Copper	0.2mg	9%
Fluoride	0.7μg	
Manganese	0.3mg	17%
Selenium	9.5μg	14%
Retinol	0μg	
Lycopene	0μg	
Thiamine	0.1mg	4%
Riboflavin	0mg	2%
Niacin	1.2mg	6%
Folate	6μg	2%
Choline	9.7mg	2%
Betaine	0.2mg	
*Note: Percent daily values (% DV) are based on; a 2,000-calorie diet. Percentage values will differ, according to calorie requirements and intake.

== See also ==
- Coffee substitute
- List of barley-based drinks
- List of lemon dishes and drinks
- Rice water
