= List of barley-based drinks =

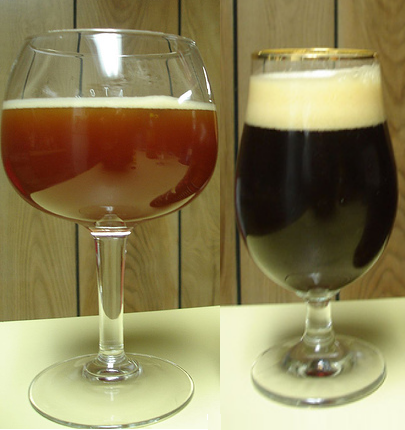
The color of barley wines ranges from a translucent deep amber, to cloudy mahogany (left), to a near-opaque black (right).

Barley, a member of the grass family, was one of the first domesticated grains in the Fertile Crescent and drinks made from it range from thin herbal teas and beers to thicker drinkable puddings and gruels.

Barley has been used as a source of fermentable material for beer for thousands of years and whiskey for centuries. Barley beer was probably one of the first alcoholic drinks developed by Neolithic humans. More recently, it has been used as a component of various health foods and drinks.

In 2016, barley was ranked fourth among grains in quantity produced (141 million tonnes) behind maize, rice, and wheat (all of which are used for beer).

== Barley-based drinks ==
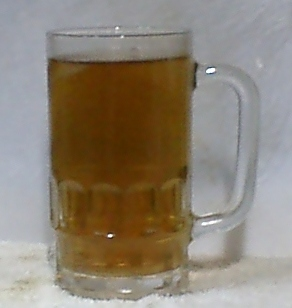
A glass mug of mugicha, a type of roasted barley tea

=== Traditional drinks ===
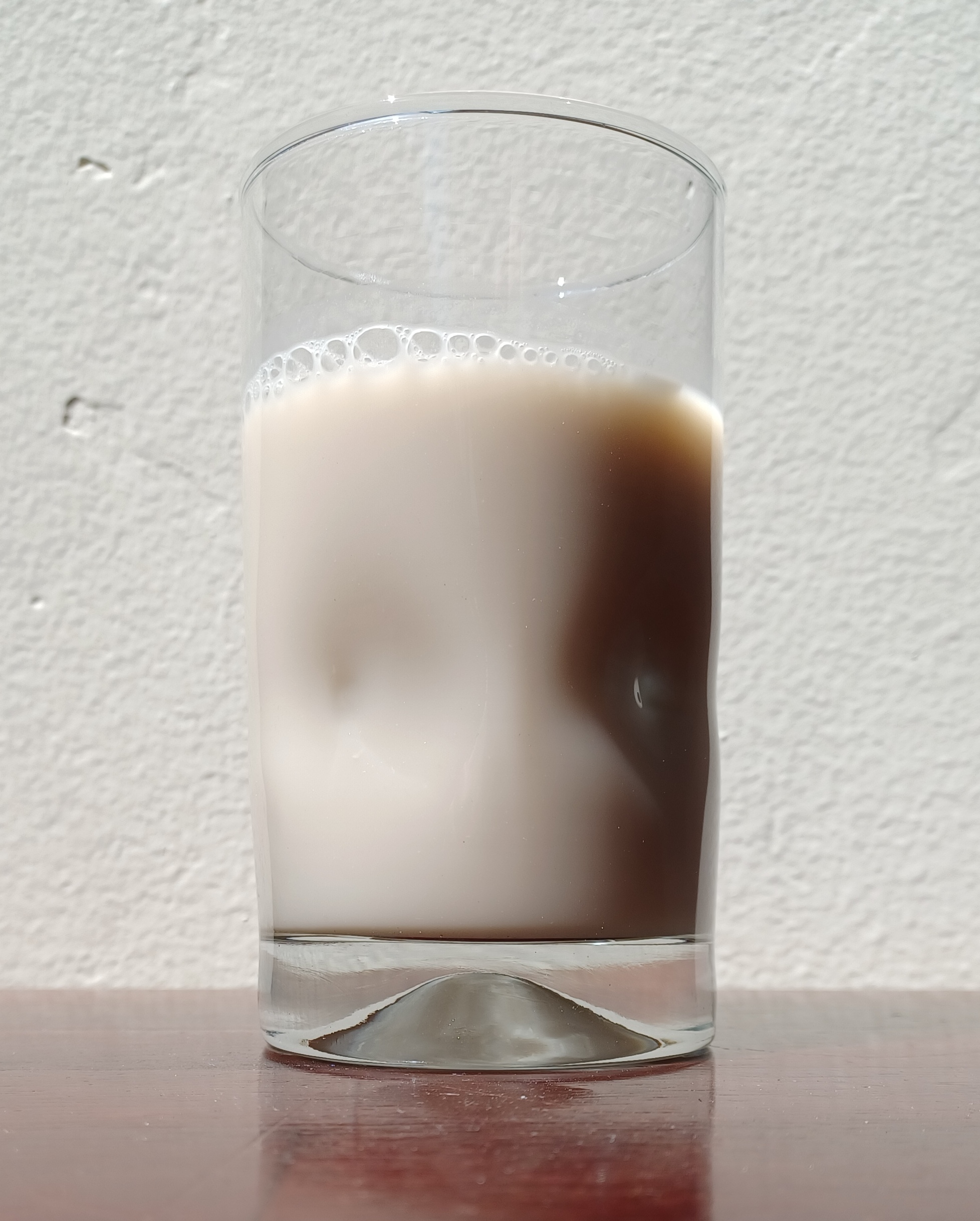
Barley milk

- Barley milk
- Barley tea
- Barley water
- Barley wine
- Beer, including corn beer, rice beer, and wheat beer
- Café de cebada
- Caffè d'orzo (Coffee of Barley)
- Emoliente
- Genever
- Malt drink
- Malt liquor
- Malt whisky
- Malta (soft drink)
- Malted milk
- Pinol
- Talbina

=== Commercial products ===
- Amul Pro
- Barleycup
- Canvas Barley Milk
- Caro
- Horlicks
- Inka
- Milo
- Ovaltine
- Pero
- RoBarr roasted barley
- Robinsons barley water
- Supermalt

== See also ==
- Coffee substitute
- Malt
- Mash ingredients
- Roasted grain drink
