= Barley tea =

Infusion made from roasted barley grains

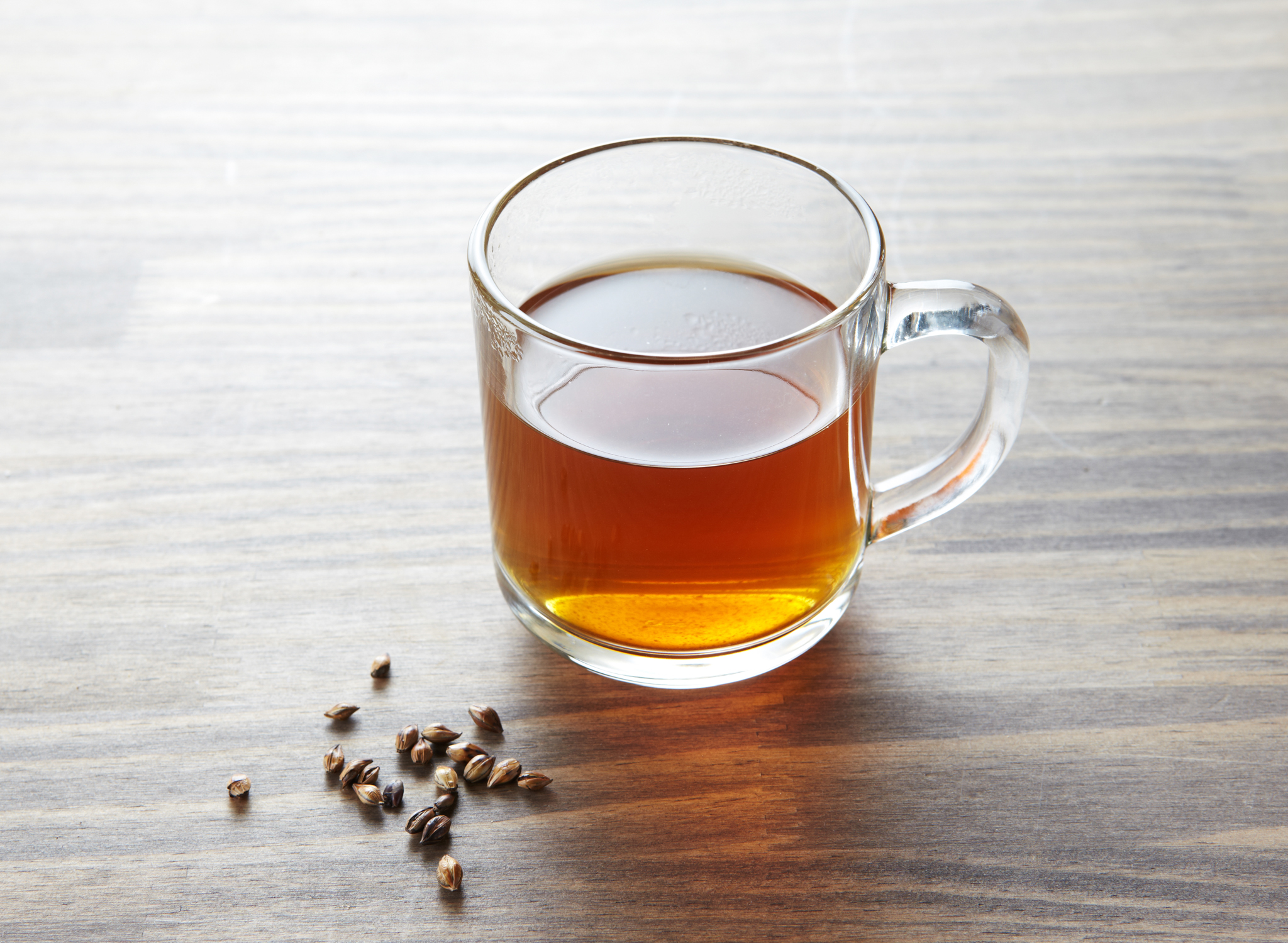
- Type: Herbal tea
- Other names: Bori-cha; dàmài-chá; mugi-cha; be̍h-á-tê
- Origin: East Asia
- Quick description: Tea made from roasted barley
- Temperature: 100 °C (212 °F)
- Time: 5–10 minutes

Barley tea

Chinese name
- Traditional Chinese: 大麥茶
- Simplified Chinese: 大麦茶
- Literal meaning: barley tea
Transcriptions
Standard Mandarin
- Hanyu Pinyin: dàmài chá
- Wade–Giles: ta^{4} mai^{4} ch'a^{2}
Yue: Cantonese
- Yale Romanization: daaihmahk chàh
- Jyutping: daai6 mak6 caa4

Korean name
- Hangul: 보리차
- Hanja: 보리茶
- Literal meaning: barley tea
Transcriptions
- Revised Romanization: boricha
- McCune–Reischauer: porich'a

Japanese name
- Kanji: 麦茶
- Kana: むぎちゃ
Transcriptions
- Revised Hepburn: mugi-cha

Barley tea is a roasted-grain-based infusion made from barley. It is a staple beverage in many East Asian countries such as China, Japan, and Korea. It has a roasty, bready, slightly bitter flavor.

In Korea, the tea is consumed either hot or cold, often taking the place of drinking water in many homes and restaurants. In Japan, it is usually served cold and is a common summertime refreshment. The tea is also widely available in tea bags or bottled in Korea and Japan.

== Etymology ==
In China, barley tea is called dàmài-chá (大麦茶; 大麥茶) or mài-chá (麦茶; 麥茶), in which dàmài (大麦; 大麥) or mài (麦; 麥) means "barley" and chá (茶) means "tea".

In Japan, barley tea is called mugi-cha (麦茶), which shares the same Chinese characters as Chinese mài-chá (麦茶; 麥茶), or mugi-yu (麦湯; むぎゆ), in which yu (湯; ゆ) also means "hot water".

In Korea, barley tea is called bori-cha (보리차), in which the native Korean bori (보리) means "barley" and Sino-Korean cha (Korean: 차; Hanja: 茶) shares the same Chinese character meaning "tea". It is sometimes called by the Sino-Korean words maekda (맥다) and maekcha (맥차), both readings of the Chinese characters 麥茶 (lit. "barley tea").

In the Gyeongsang Province of Korea, it is also called ochanmul (오찻물 or 오찬물), which comes from the Japanese word o-cha (お茶, "tea") and the Korean word mul (물, "water"), a remnant of the Japanese colonial period.

In Taiwanese Hokkien, barley tea is called be̍h-á-tê (麥仔茶), in which be̍h-á (麥仔) means "barley" and tê (茶) means "tea".

== History ==
=== Japan ===
The Wamyō Ruijushō from the early 10th century includes a recipe for a drink made by mixing barley and rice flour with water, which has been proposed as a predecessor of modern barley tea. Samurai began to consume barley tea in the Sengoku period (around the 16th century). During the Edo period (17th–19th century), street stalls specializing in barley tea were popular among the common people.

Before refrigeration technology spread in the late 1950s and early 1960s, barley tea was commonly kept in unglazed earthenware, which kept the drink cool by evaporation. In 1963, the company Hitachiya Honpo brought the first tea bags for barley tea on the market, and in 1965, Ishigaki Foods released the first cold-brew tea bags that do not require boiling water.

Consumption of barley tea has risen significantly in the 20th century due to an increased need to stay hydrated in summer months, especially around the planned power outages following the 2011 Tōhoku earthquake and in the 2018 record-breaking heat wave. The market size reached 123 billion yen in 2022, a 3.5-fold increase in 10 years.

=== Korea ===
Barley tea became popular in Korea during the period of Japanese colonial occupation (1910-1945). It and corn tea may have served as alternatives to sungnyung, a traditional Korean drink made from scorched rice that became less common in the mid 20th century as new ways of cooking rice became popular that don't typically produce scorched rice at the bottom.

== Availability ==
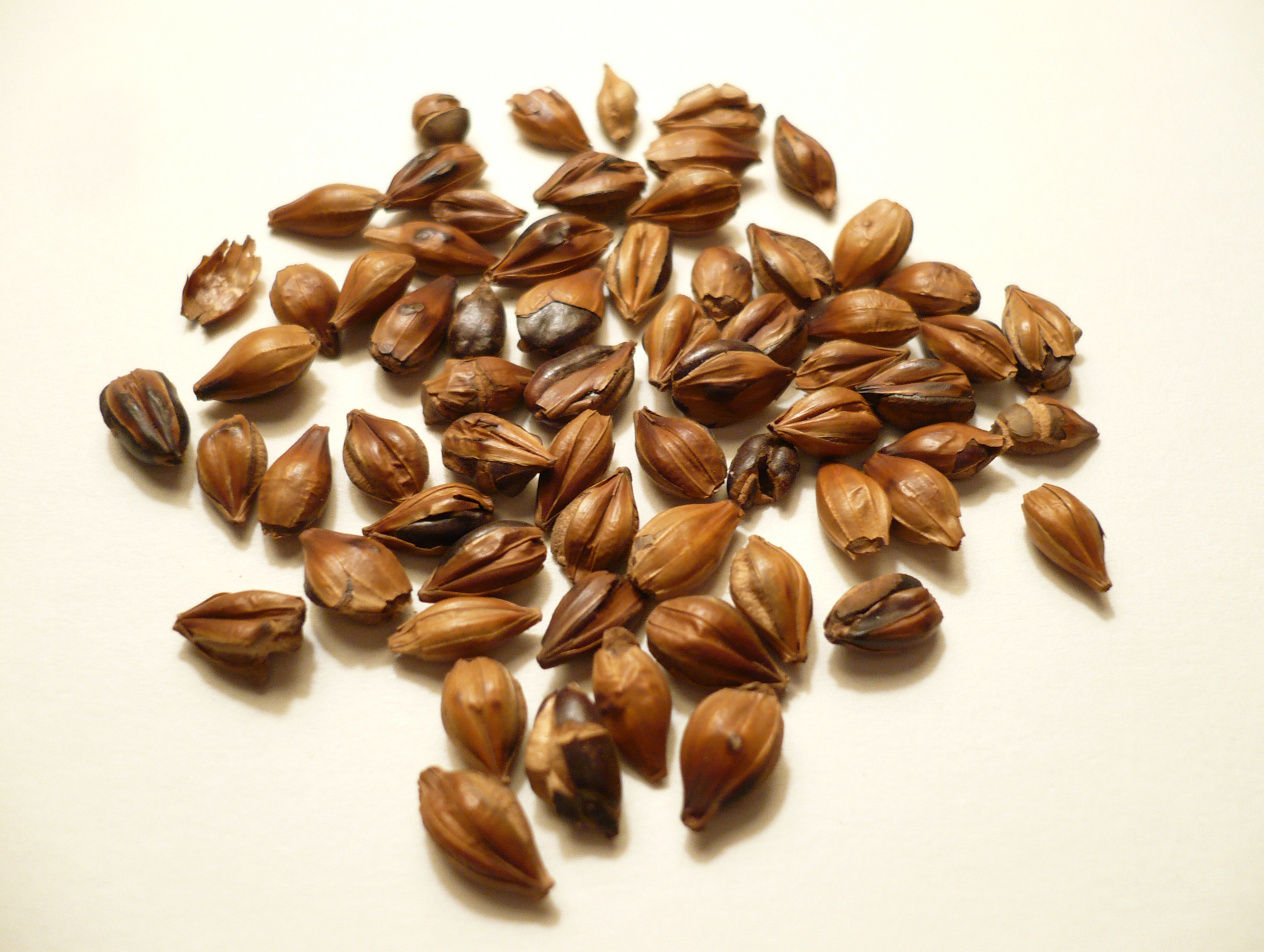
Roasted barley grains of a Korean brand of barley tea

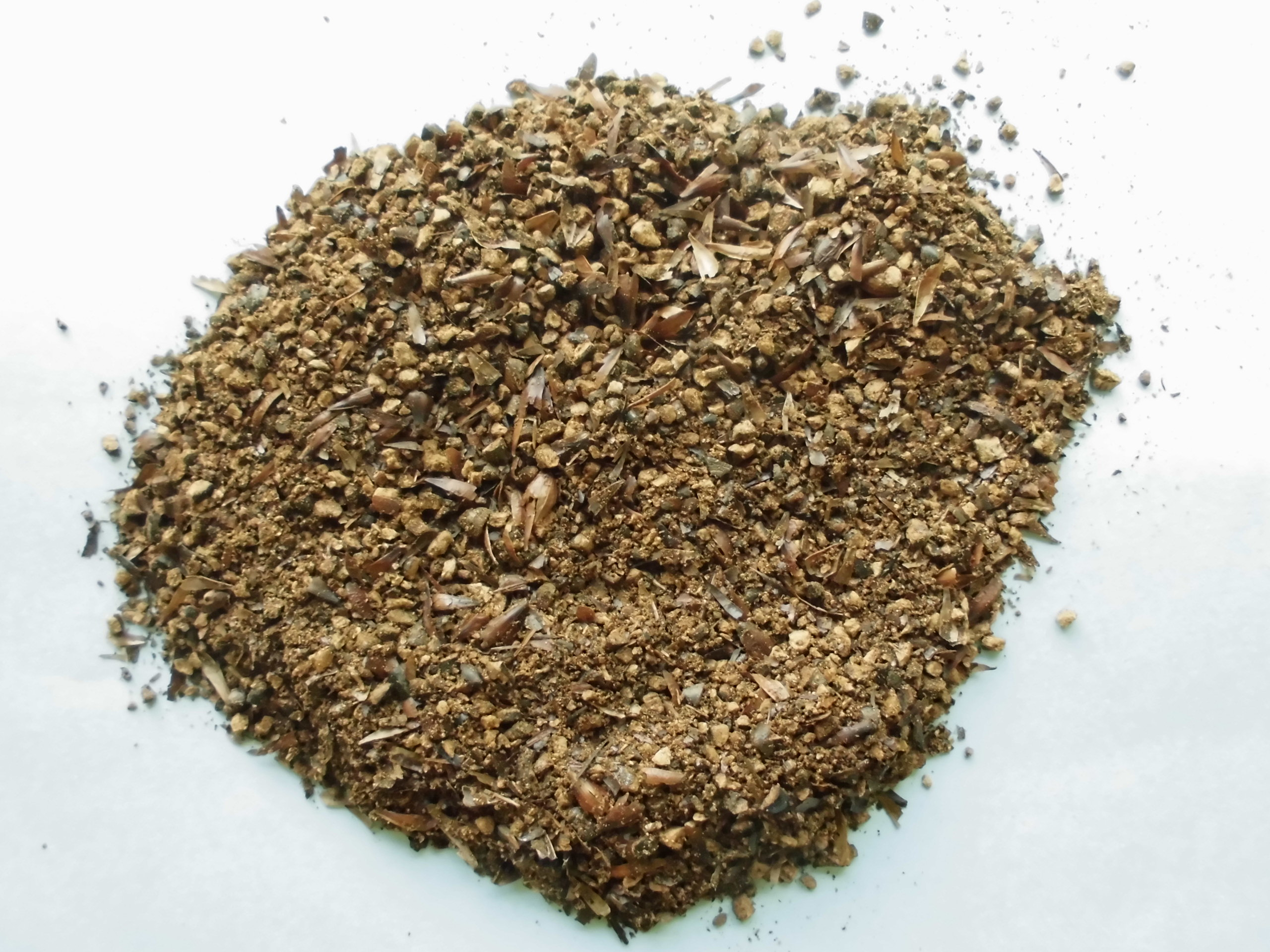
Ground barley grains of a Japanese brand of barley tea

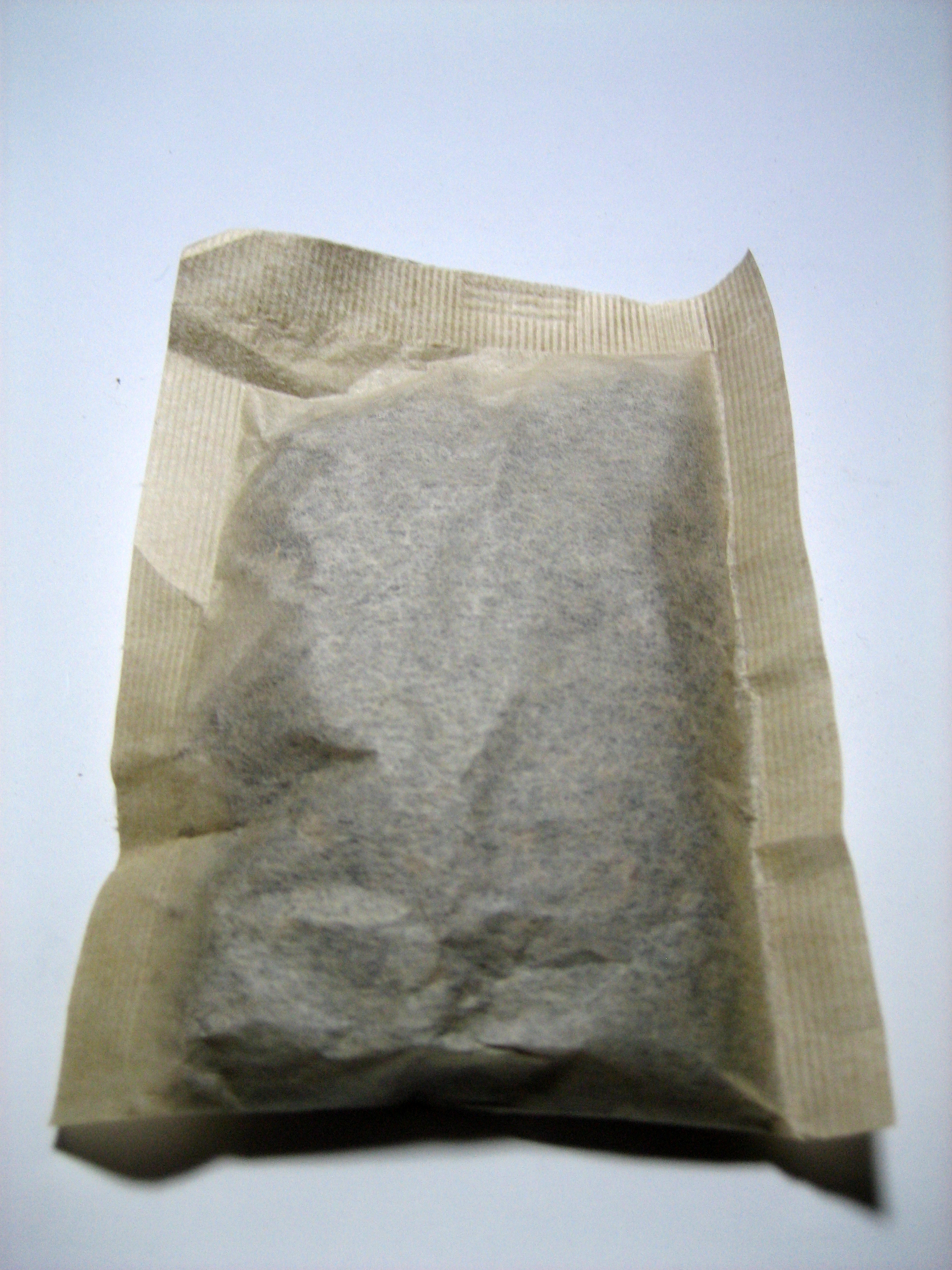
A tea bag for preparing a jar of barley tea, Japanese brand

The tea can be prepared by boiling roasted unhulled barley kernels in water or brewing roasted and ground barley in hot water. In Japan, tea bags containing ground barley became more popular than the traditional barley kernels during the early 1980s and remain the norm today. The tea is also available prepackaged in PET bottles.

=== Bottled tea ===
Bottled barley tea is sold at supermarkets, convenience stores, and in vending machines in Japan and Korea. Sold mostly in PET bottles, cold barley tea is a common summertime drink in Japan. In Korea, hot barley tea in heat-resistant PET bottles is also found in vending machines and in heated cabinets in convenience stores. In Taiwan, while AGV barley tea is a well-known bottled barley tea, particularly at restaurants in Taiwan, bottled barley tea had not been widely accepted in the customer market until the 2020s.

=== Blended barley and similar teas ===
In Korea, roasted barley is also often combined with roasted maize, as the latter's sweetness offsets the slightly bitter flavor of the barley. The tea made from roasted maize is called oksusu-cha (corn tea), and the tea made from roasted maize and roasted barley is called oksusu-bori-cha (corn barley tea). Similar drinks made from roasted grains include hyeonmi-cha (brown rice tea), gyeolmyeongja-cha (sicklepod seed tea), and memil-cha (buckwheat tea).

Roasted barley tea in ground form, and sometimes combined with chicory or other ingredients, is also sold as a coffee substitute.

== Barley Tea Day ==
In 1986, June 1st was designated as Barley Tea Day (麦茶の日, mugi-cha no hi) by the National Barley Tea Manufacturers Cooperative of Japan (全国麦茶工業協同組合, Zenkoku Mugi-cha Kōgyō Kyōdō Kumiai). The Cooperative explains on their website that June is the harvest season for barley, and that June 1st is also the first day of summer, reflecting barley tea's status as a typical summertime drink in the country.

== See also ==
- Barley water
- Caffè d'orzo
- Caro (drink)
- List of barley-based beverages
- Postum
- Roasted grain beverage
