= Caffè d'orzo =

Hot barley drink originating in Italy

Caffè d'orzo (pronounced [kafˌfɛ dˈɔrdzo]; lit. 'barley coffee') is a type of hot drink originating in Italy. It is a caffeine-free roasted grain beverage made from ground barley (orzo in Italian, from Latin hordeum).

== Preparation ==
It is an espresso-style drink, and when prepared from the roasted barley directly, it can easily be made in typical espresso machines and coffeemakers. In Italy it is widely available in coffee vending machines and traditionally considered a coffee substitute for children.

In Italy caffè d'orzo is made in traditional Italian espresso machines in cafes. At home, Italians can make the drink using an orziera, a special moka pot adapted to barley.

== History ==
During World War II and in the post-war era, caffè d'orzo and chicory became popular substitutes for coffee, which was expensive due to rationing and food shortages.

== Variations outside Italy ==
A variety called café de cebada ("coffee of barley") in Spanish and simply Cevada in Portuguese is available in Latin American markets, though it is often more of a roasted barley tea than a coffee-like beverage. Instant roasted barley drinks are sold under various brand names (although most of them are made with a mix of cereals, not only barley) such as Caro (Europe, New Zealand), Pero (Switzerland, US), Barleycup (UK) and Ecco (Chile), among others.

== See also ==
- List of barley-based beverages
