= Inka (drink) =

Polish roasted grain beverage

Inka is a Polish roasted grain drink developed in the late 1960s. Since 1971 Inka has been produced in Skawina, a centre of coffee production since the early 20th century. Currently it is manufactured by GRANA sp. z o.o. While it was used in part as a coffee substitute to alleviate coffee shortages in the 1970s, Inka remains popular, in part because it is caffeine-free. It is exported to Canada and the United States as Naturalis Inka in packaging reminiscent of that used in Poland in the early 1990s.

Inka is a roasted mixture of rye, barley, chicory, and sugar beet. Cereals make up 72% of the content and in the classic version there are no artificial ingredients or other additives. Additional varieties include supplements or flavouring.

Inka is sold in the following varieties:

- Inka Classic
- Inka Pro-Health – fortified with additional magnesium.
- Inka Flavoured – three varieties: with Chocolate, Milk (contains sugar), or Caramel
- Inka Fibre
- Inka Calcium and Vitamins (in Polish "Wapń i Witaminy")
- Inka Gluten Free

== See also ==
- Barleycup
- Caro
- List of barley-based drinks
- Postum
