= Westpaket =

Care package from West to East Germany

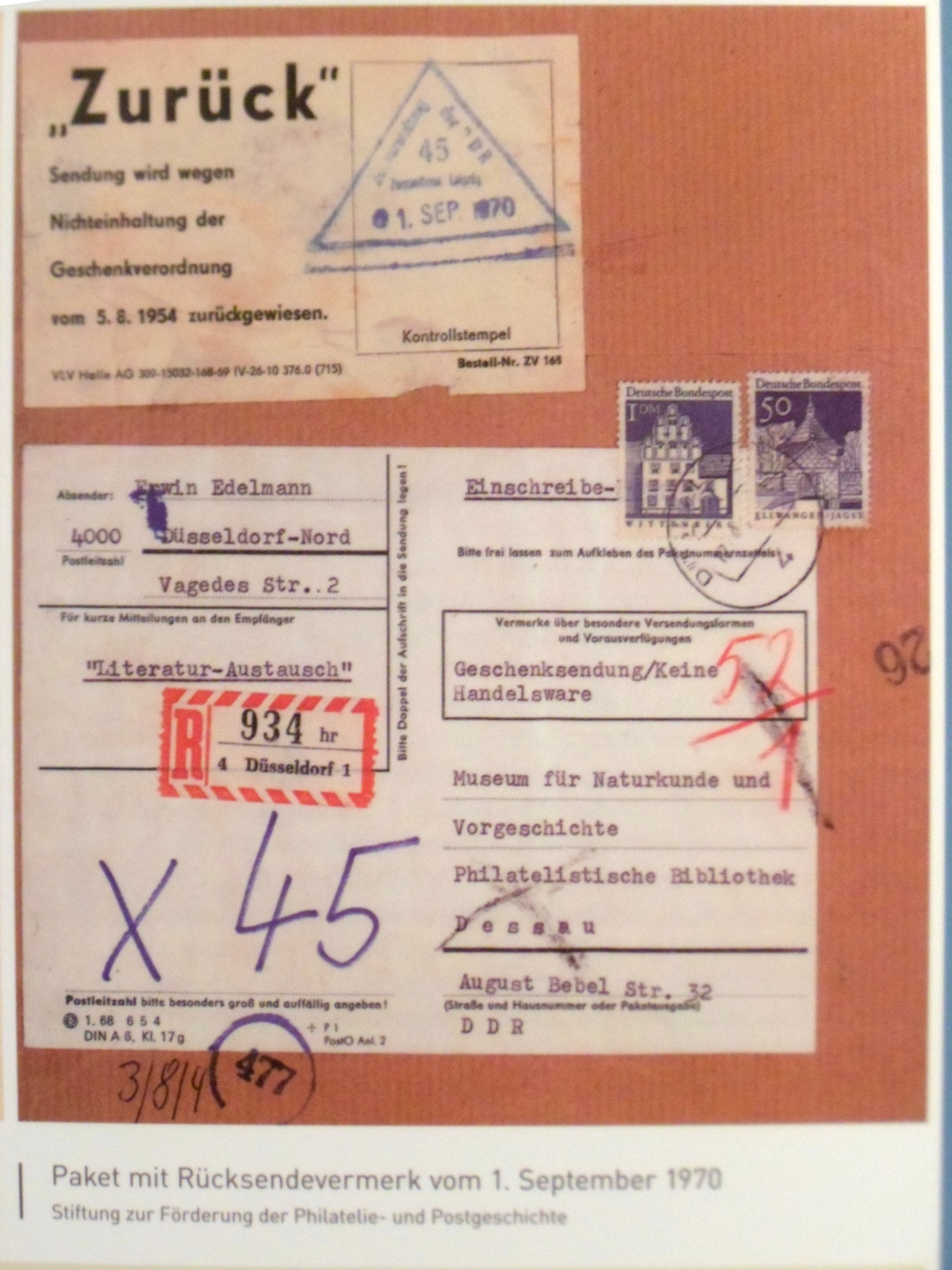
A Westpaket that was rejected by the Deutsche Post of the GDR. The 1 DM West German stamps depict the Melanchthonhaus, which was located in East Germany.

Westpaket (German for "Western package", plural: Westpakete) is the common term for care packages sent by West Germans to their friends and families in East Germany during the division of Germany from 1961 to 1989.

== History ==
During the division of Germany from 1945 to 1990, and particularly after the construction of the Berlin Wall in 1961, East Germans were largely unable to visit West German friends and family members. At the urging of the Office for Pan-German Aid (German: Büro für gesamtdeutsche Hilfe), many West Germans regularly sent packages to East German relatives on special occasions, such as for birthdays or Christmas. In return, many East Germans would send an Ostpaket, often containing food, spirits, handicrafts, or confections, such as Stollen for Christmas. With limited opportunities for phone calls and letters, Westpaket were often the sole form of contact for families, and served as a pleasant improvement for daily life. Beginning in the 1960s, East Germany was able to reliably provide basic necessities, but luxury and exotic products remained scarce.

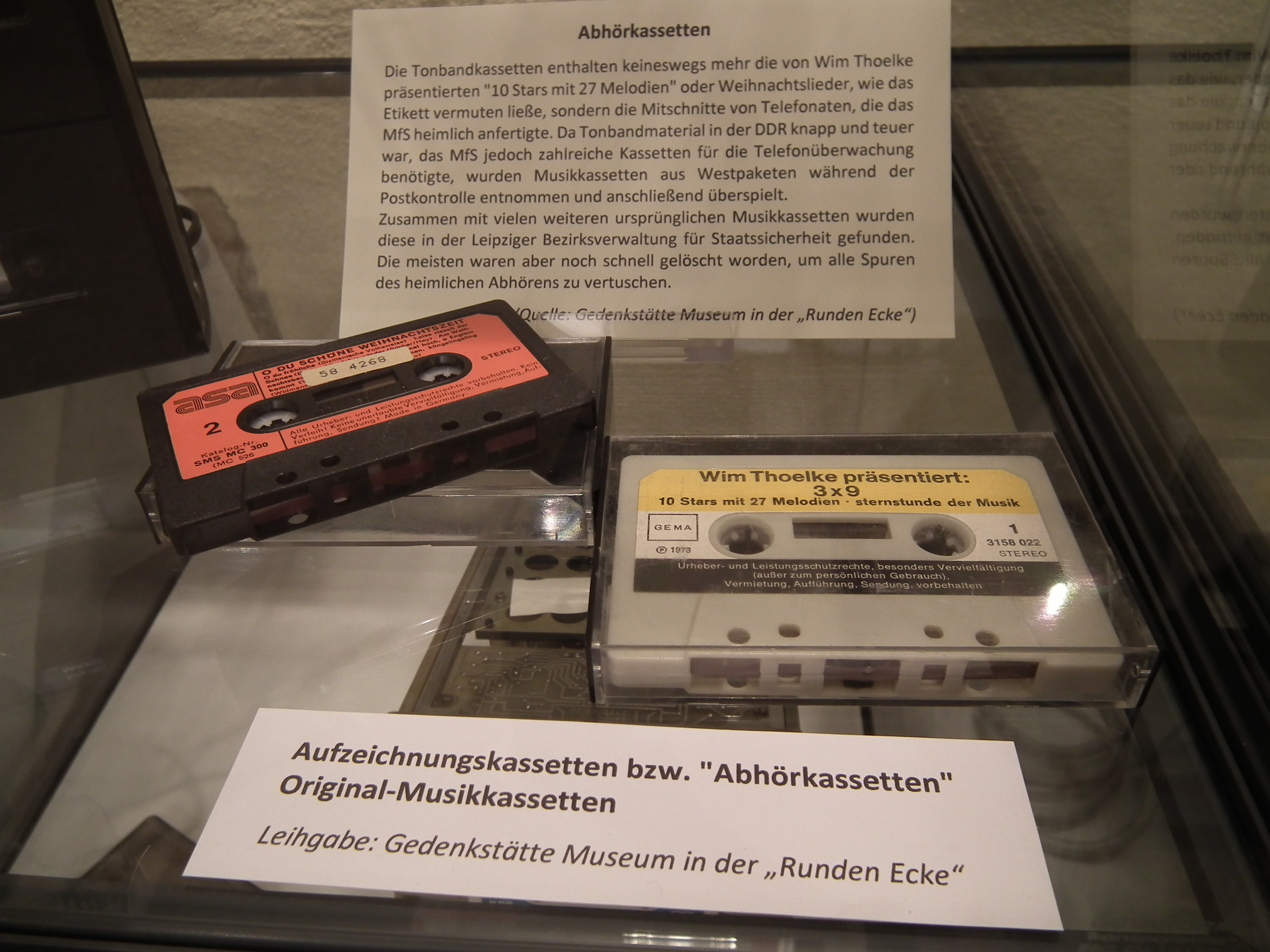
Confiscated audio cassettes were recycled by the Stasi for recording phone calls. Mass surveillance in East Germany required an enormous amount of magnetic tape, which was a scarce and expensive good, and Westpakete were a free and convenient source of audio cassettes.

Westpaket had to be labeled as "Gift shipment, not for sale" with a list of contents. Commonly requested items were clothing, bedding, confections, coffee, nylon stockings, and baking ingredients. Shipments were not permitted to contain money, such as West German Deutsche Marks; occasionally, currency was concealed inside the packaging. Also banned was media that could not be visually inspected, such as Compact Cassettes, which were confiscated by the authorities. Medicine, newspapers, toy guns and military-themed toys were also banned.

Packages were often prepared using high-quality materials, such as wrapping paper, which were frequently unavailable in the east, and could be saved and reused by the recipient.

To encourage families to maintain ties, the costs of the packages were tax-deductible. An average of 25 million packages were shipped per year, containing about 1,000 tonnes of coffee and five million articles of clothing: both were highly desired and often used by the recipients to barter for other goods.

The government of East Germany initially tried to hamper the flow of packages, for example by demanding proof of disinfection for second-hand clothing, but eventually came to see the packages as an integral part of fulfilling domestic demand for consumer goods. Westpaket met about 20% of East Germany's coffee needs.

During the East German coffee crisis in 1977, the East German Politbüro and Socialist Unity Party incorporated West German coffee shipments into their plans to meet domestic demand despite reducing coffee imports due to unstable commodity prices.

== See also ==
- Economy of East Germany
