= East German coffee crisis =

1970s shortages of coffee in East Germany

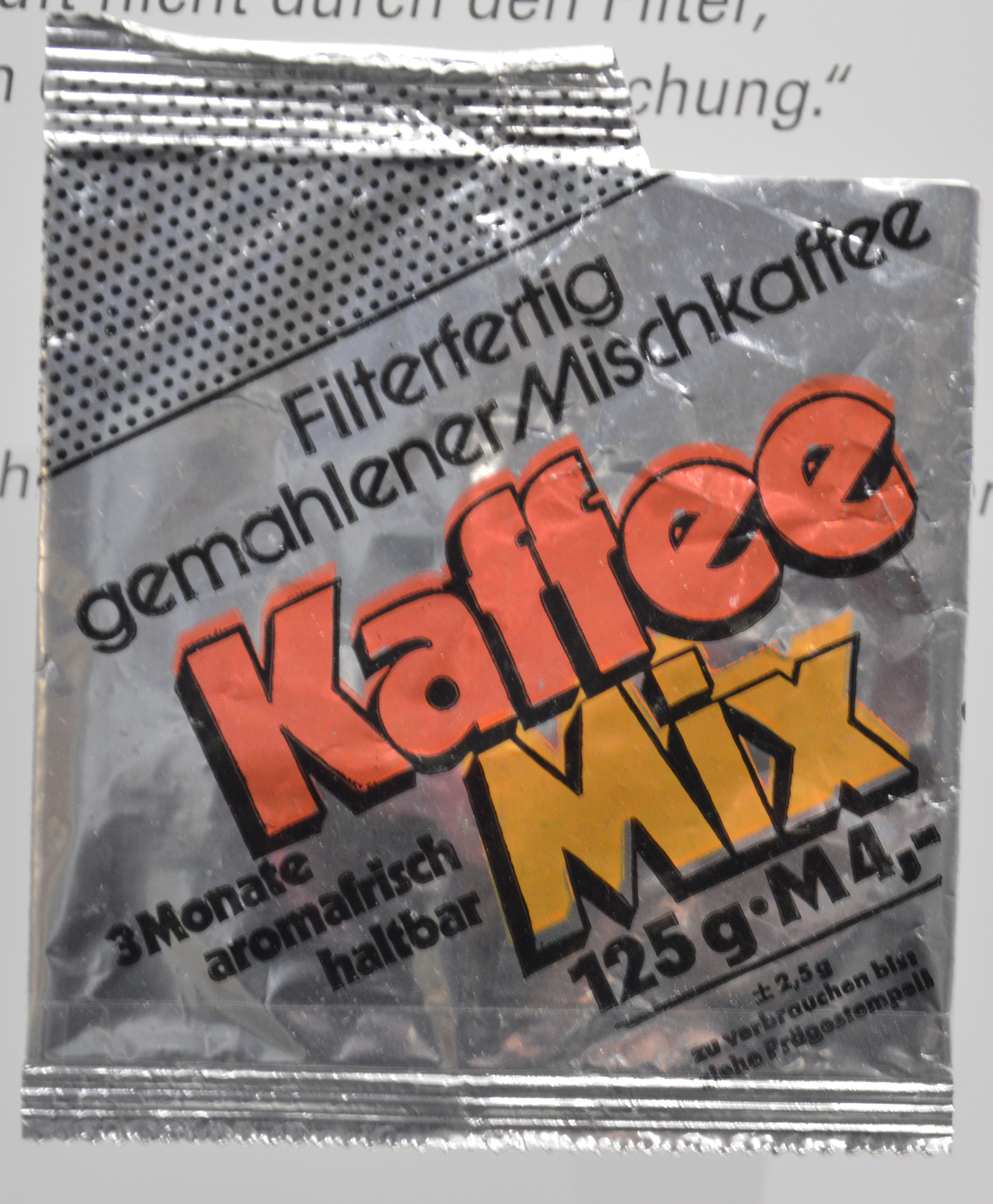
East German coffee mix, consisting of 51% coffee, produced due to shortages

The East German coffee crisis was a shortage of coffee in the late 1970s in East Germany caused by a poor harvest and unstable commodity prices, severely limiting the government's ability to buy coffee on the world market. As a consequence, the East German government increased its engagement in Africa and Asia, exporting weapons and equipment to coffee-producing nations.

== Situation ==
In 1977, East Germany experienced difficulties meeting domestic demand for coffee, a commodity that had to be bought using Westgeld, i.e. freely convertible Western currencies that were in short supply in Eastern Bloc countries. The coffee crisis indirectly led to changes in the world market for coffee. It led to a reorientation of East German foreign policy as well as considerable belt-tightening. In particular, the East German government engaged in barter with developing countries, exporting weapons and trucks in exchange for coffee and energy.

== Background ==
In the Soviet occupation zone, much like the rest of Europe after World War II, coffee was a scarce good. The first coffee imported into East Germany came from the Soviet Union. When these imports stopped in 1954, this led to the first mass shortages and intensified efforts to acquire foreign currency with which to purchase coffee. Beginning in 1957, roasted coffee was produced under the brand name Röstfein. Beginning in the 1960s, East Germany was able to reliably provide basic necessities, but luxury goods and imported products remained scarce. This led to increased demand for the available luxury goods, such as confections, tobacco, alcoholic beverages, and coffee (3.6 kilograms (7.9 lb) annually per capita) in the 1970s. By the 1970s, coffee was one of the most important items in an East German household budget, although gifts from friends and relatives in the West met about 20 percent of the country's coffee needs. East German citizens spent an average of 3.3 billion East German marks for coffee per year, an amount comparable to expenditures on furniture and twice the amount spent on shoes.

== Coffee crisis of 1977 ==
The coffee crisis began in 1976. The price of coffee rose dramatically after a failed harvest in Brazil, forcing the East German government to spend approximately 700 million West German marks on coffee (approximately US$300 million, equivalent to $1.59 billion today), nearly five times the expected DM 150 million per year. The Socialist Unity Party (SED) leadership restricted the importation of food and luxury goods, while trying to gather sufficient foreign currency reserves to import petroleum. This occurred against the backdrop of the 1970s energy crisis, as the effects of the 1973 oil shock only began to affect East Germany in the mid-1970s.

The suggestion to cease coffee production, put forward by Alexander Schalck-Golodkowski, was able to be avoided after Politburo member Werner Lamberz encouraged barter trades with, and armament sales to, Third World countries, such as Ethiopia and Mozambique. The cheapest variety of coffee, "Kosta", was discontinued and only more expensive varieties were available. Other alternatives were made available, such as "Kaffee-Mix", a 50 percent mixture of genuine and ersatz coffee, and rationing was not required. The Kaffee-Mix was pejoratively referred to as "Erichs Krönung", a reference to Erich Honecker, leader of East Germany, and the West German Jacobs Krönung coffee brand. The East German government assumed that much of the population would acquire coffee from Westpakete sent by West German relatives. This increased the demand for the typical return gift, a Dresdner Stollen, which also caused difficulties in the East German economy, because many of the ingredients, such as almonds, raisins, and succade, were also only available as imported goods. Alexander Schalck-Golodkowski's suggestion of a ban on giving Stollen was unsuccessful.

The citizens of East Germany overwhelmingly rejected the Kaffee-Mix and saw the coffee shortage as an attack on a major consumer need that was a large part of everyday life. The coffee mix also damaged some coffee machines, as the mixture contained substitute ingredients such as pea flour, which contains proteins that swell under heat and pressure, clogging the filters. This led to numerous complaints and outrage and protests. Even though the price of coffee on the international markets retreated and normalized in 1978, the problems faced by the East German government acquiring foreign currency continued into the 1980s, prolonging shortages that progressively damaged the image of the country's political leadership. It is estimated that 20–25 percent of the entire East German coffee consumption from 1975 to 1977 arrived from the West in care packages. Coffee attained a value as a symbol of inner-German unity, far above its role as a mere consumer good or commodity.

== Effects on West Germany ==
In West Germany, the coffee price increases in 1977 did not lead to any shortages, but did lead to the adoption of cheaper varieties of coffee in the lower price segment. Coffee brands such as Tchibo and later Eduscho began to expand into cross-selling, by offering coffee as well as non-food items. These changes can also be attributed to the effects of the coffee crisis on West Germany.

== Influence on coffee production in Vietnam ==
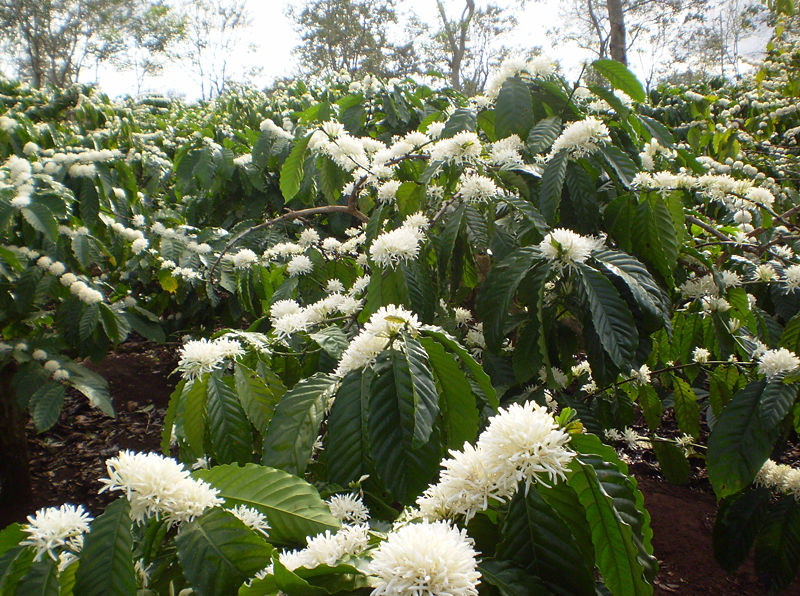
Robusta coffee plants flowering in Đắk Lắk, Vietnam

The relationship between East Germany and Vietnam was exceptionally close. Coffee production began in Vietnam in 1926 during French colonial rule. Beginning in 1975, largely parallel with the coffee crisis in East Germany, the production of Robusta coffee began in Vietnam. Robusta plants grow faster, contain more caffeine, suit the climate of the Vietnamese Central Highlands, and lend themselves better to mechanized harvesting. However, Robusta coffee is cheaper and far more bitter than the standard Arabica.

In 1980 and 1986, two treaties were signed between East Germany and Vietnam, whereby East Germany provided the necessary equipment and machinery for production, increased the area of coffee plantations from 600 to 8,600 hectares (1,500 to 21,300 acres), and trained the local population in cultivation techniques. In particular, East Germany provided trucks, machinery, and irrigation systems for the newly founded Kombinat Việt-Đức, as well as spending approximately $20 million on a hydropower plant. East Germany also built housing, hospitals, and shops for the 10,000 people who were relocated to the area for coffee production. Against this investment, East Germany was scheduled to receive half of the coffee harvest for the next 20 years. However, coffee takes eight years from planting until the first usable harvest, which occurred in 1990; at which point the East German state had already ceased to exist.

Despite the loss of its original customer, Vietnam was able to quickly establish itself after 1990 as the second-largest coffee producer in the world after Brazil, driving much of the traditional coffee production in Africa out of the market. Export production was particularly boosted by the re-establishment of trade relations between the U.S. and Vietnam. This overproduction led to a crash in worldwide coffee prices in 2001. In 2016, Germany remained the largest export destination for Vietnamese coffee.

== See also ==
- Economy of the German Democratic Republic
- Nechezol
