= Postum =

Roasted-grain beverage popular as a coffee-substitute

- Product type: Roasted grain beverage
- Current owner: Eliza's Quest Foods
- Country: U.S.
- Introduced: 1895; 131 years ago
- Website: postum.com

Postum (US: /ˈpoʊstəm/) is a powdered roasted grain beverage used as a coffee substitute. Post Cereal Company founder C. W. Post developed the caffeine-free beverage in 1895 and marketed it as a healthier alternative to coffee. (Post was a student of John Harvey Kellogg, who regarded caffeine as unhealthy.) Post Cereal Company eventually became General Foods, and merged into Kraft Foods Inc. in 1990. Eliza's Quest Foods assumed the trademark rights and secret recipe of Postum in 2012.

The "instant" drink-mix version, introduced in 1911, replaced the original brewed beverage.

Postum is made from roasted wheat bran and molasses. In addition to the original flavor, coffee-flavored and cocoa-flavored versions have been introduced.

== Acrylamide ==
When tested by the FDA, Postum had more acrylamide than any other product, by dry weight.

== History ==
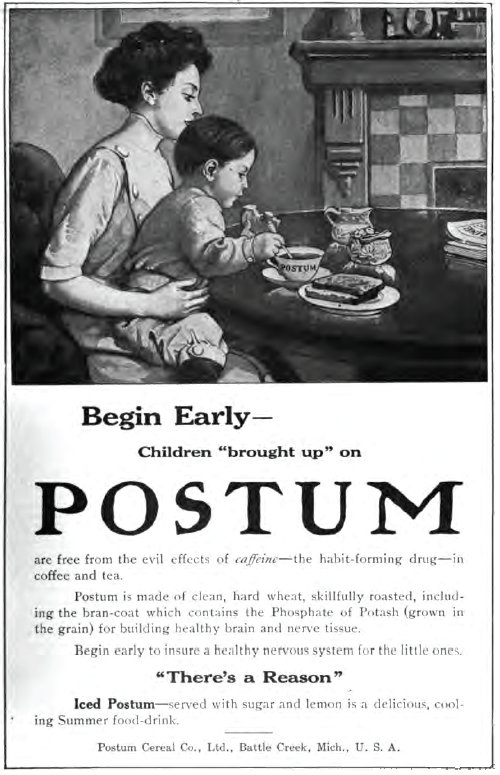
Advertisement from 1910

Lost Eyesight through Coffee Drinking

— Postum advertisement

Postum quickly became popular, making Post wealthy. The aggressive advertising, with the slogan "There's a Reason", warned against the alleged dangers of coffee and caffeine, and promoted the benefits of Postum. When imitations appeared, the company introduced a cheaper drink called Monk's Brew that was identical to Postum, but discontinued it after competitors left the market. Instant Postum appeared in 1911. A 1912 advertisement for Instant Postum is the earliest known use of the word "instant" to refer to a processed food that can be prepared immediately.

Although the Post Cereal Company explicitly stated in its advertising that Postum did not taste like coffee and was not a coffee substitute, the drink enjoyed an enormous rise in sales and popularity in the United States during World War II when coffee was rationed and people sought a replacement.

Postum was sometimes marketed by a cartoon ghost named Mr. Coffee-Nerves, who would appear in situations wherein people were shown in uncomfortable life situations (e.g., irritability, lack of sleep, lack of athletic prowess) due to their use of coffee and its negative effects. These cartoons always ended with the afflicted people switching to Postum and Mr. Coffee-Nerves fleeing until the next cartoon. The company sponsored the radio shows Lum and Abner, Beulah and The Aldrich Family, and the radio version of Father Knows Best.

Postum was popular with members of the Church of Jesus Christ of Latter-day Saints and part of Mormon culture for many years because Mormons abstain from coffee. It was also popular with those following religious dietary restrictions of Seventh-day Adventists.

The US government used Postum as a code name for polonium, used in the Urchin-style nuclear weapon initiators.

Kraft discontinued production of Postum in 2007. In 2012, Kraft sold the Postum trademark and trade secret to teachers from North Carolina who are the owners of Eliza's Quest Food. In 2018, Postum was available at Albertsons, H-E-B, Ingles, Kroger, Natural Grocers and Walmart.

== Gallery ==
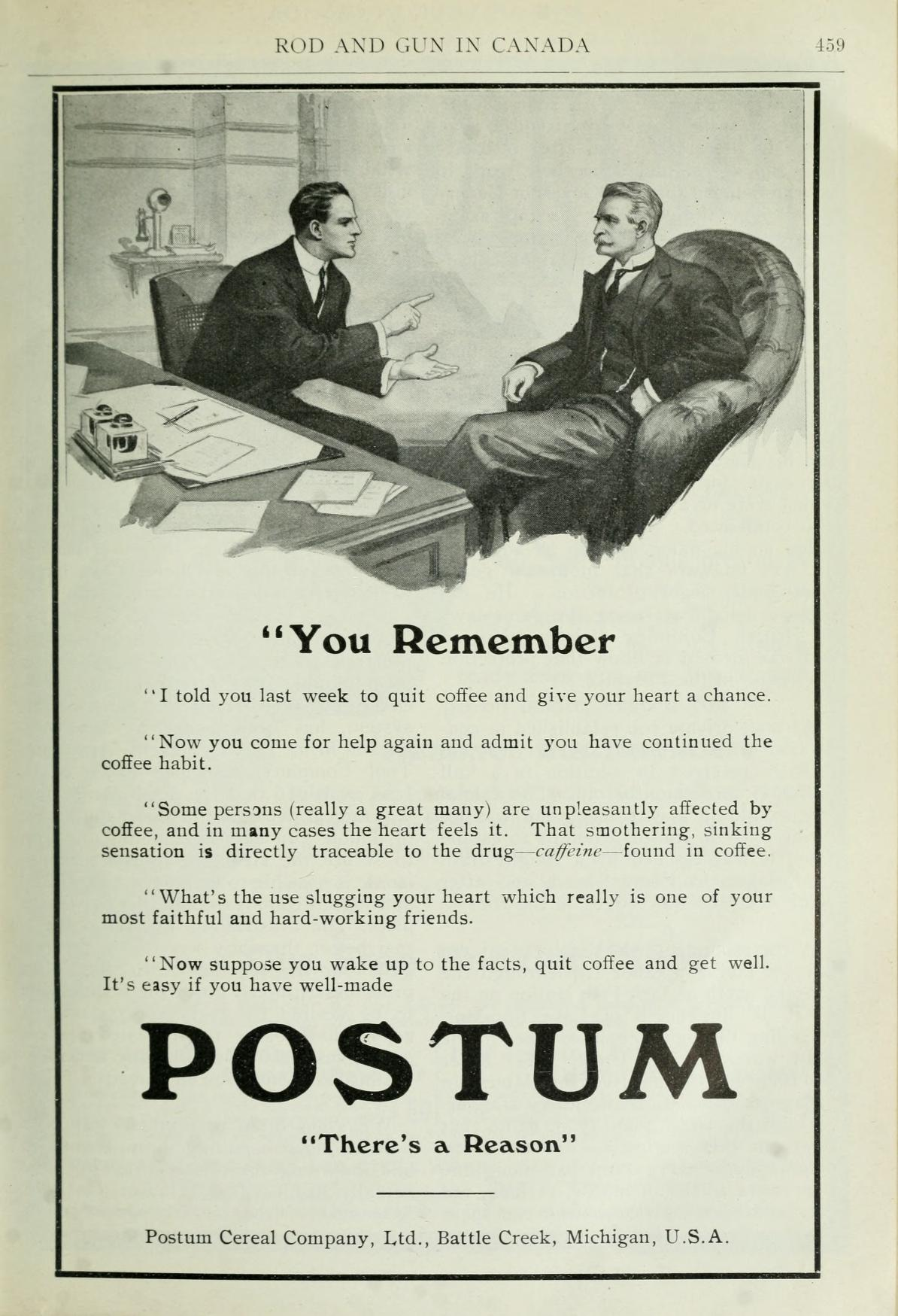

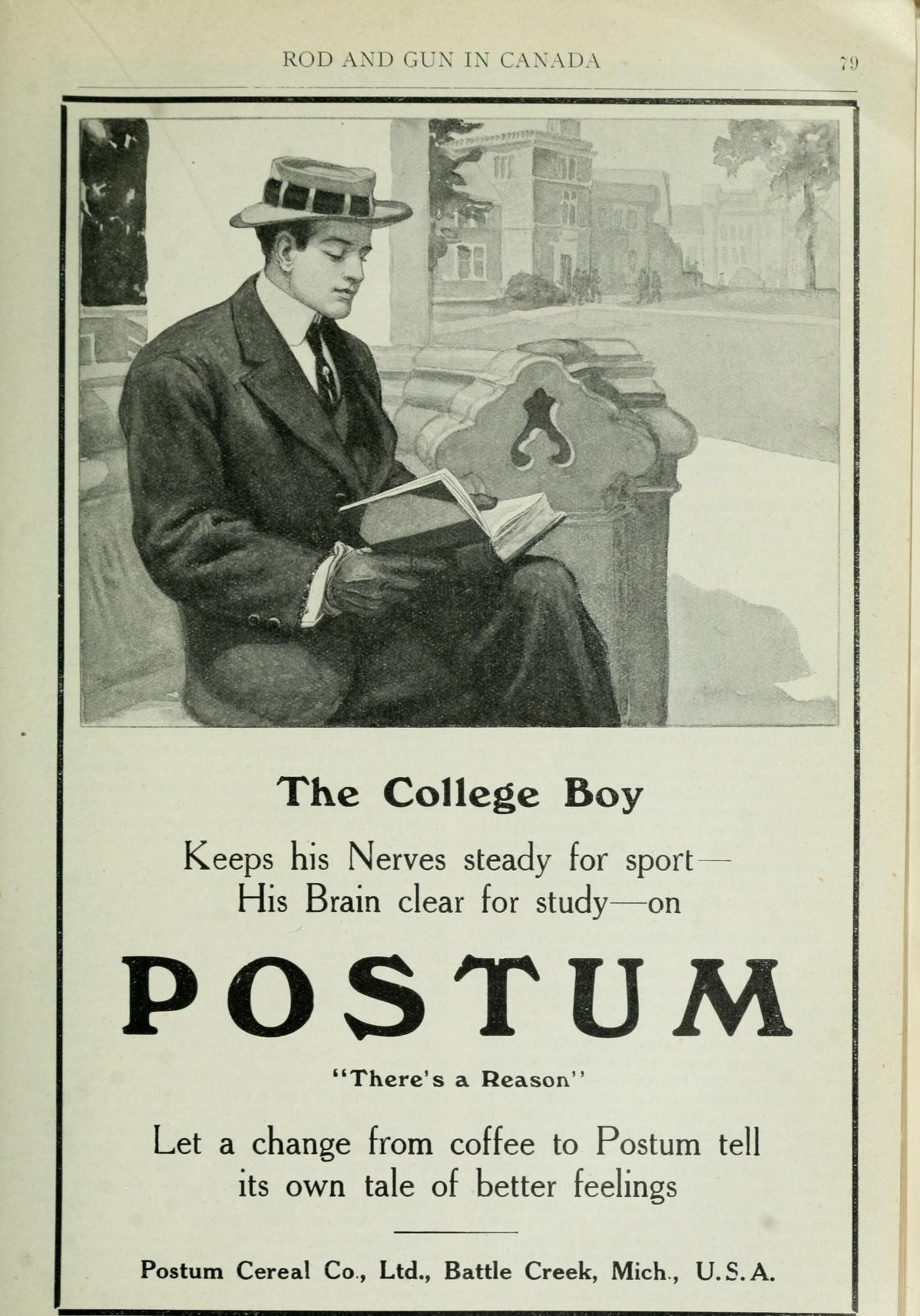

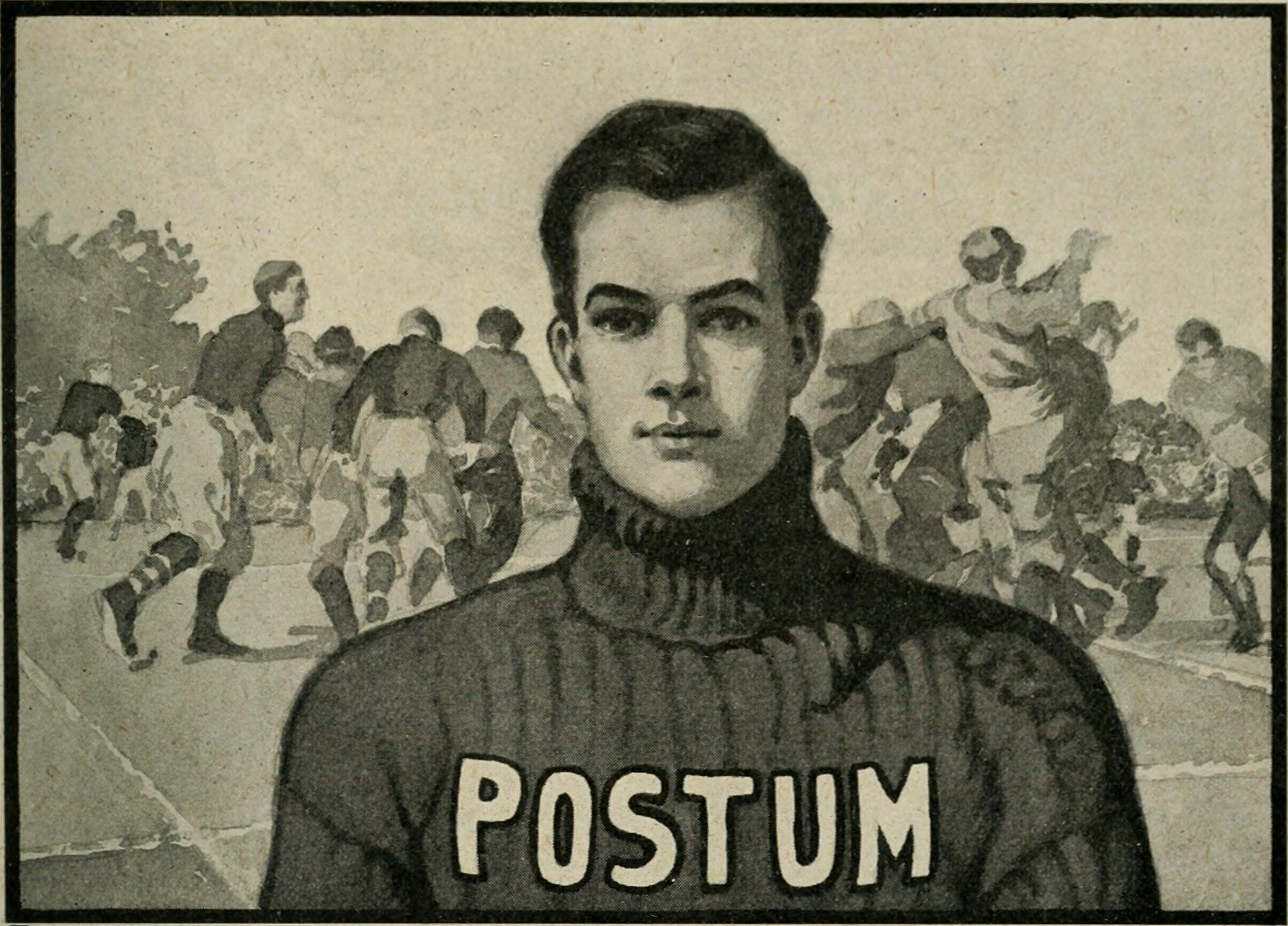

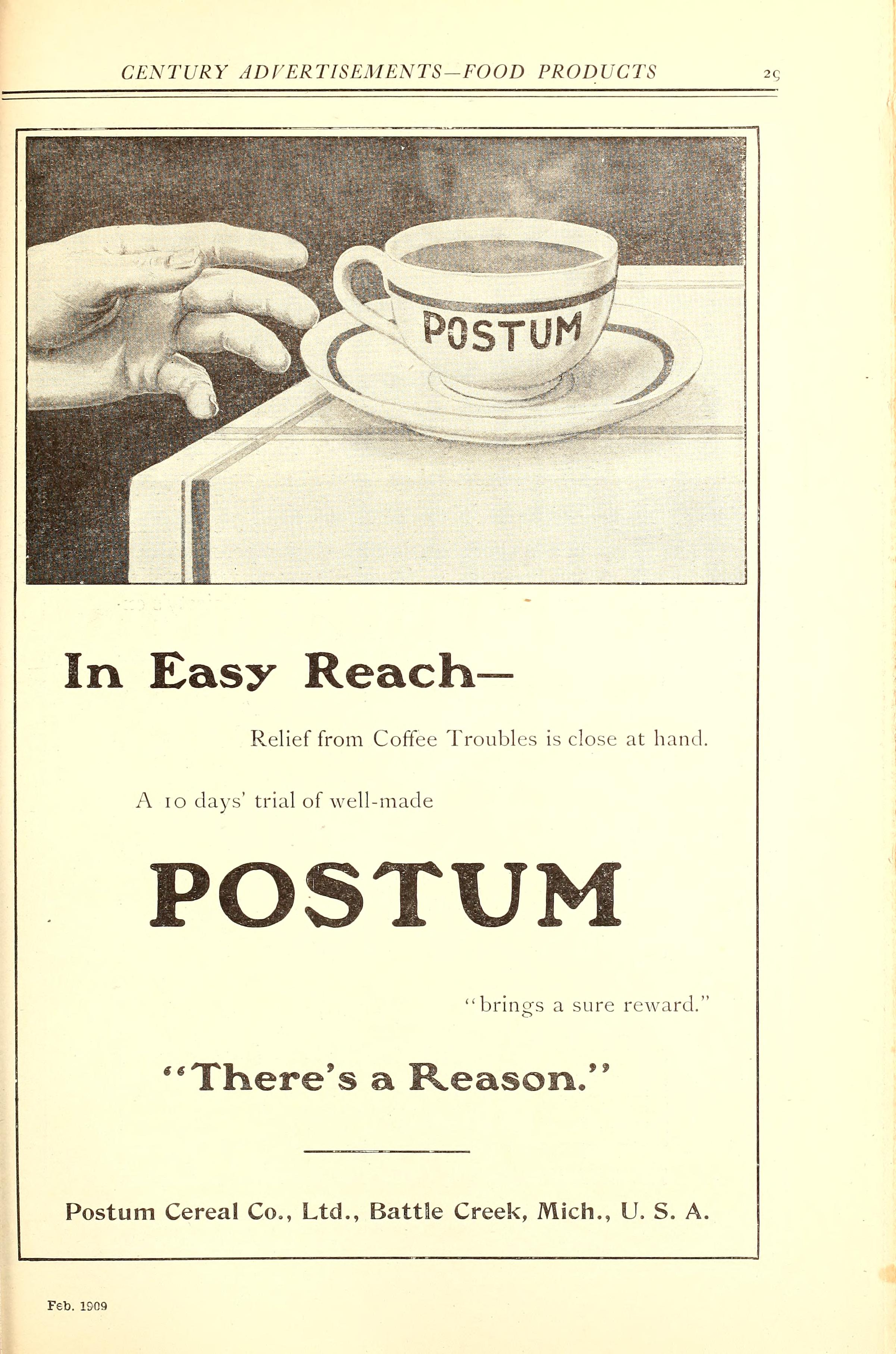

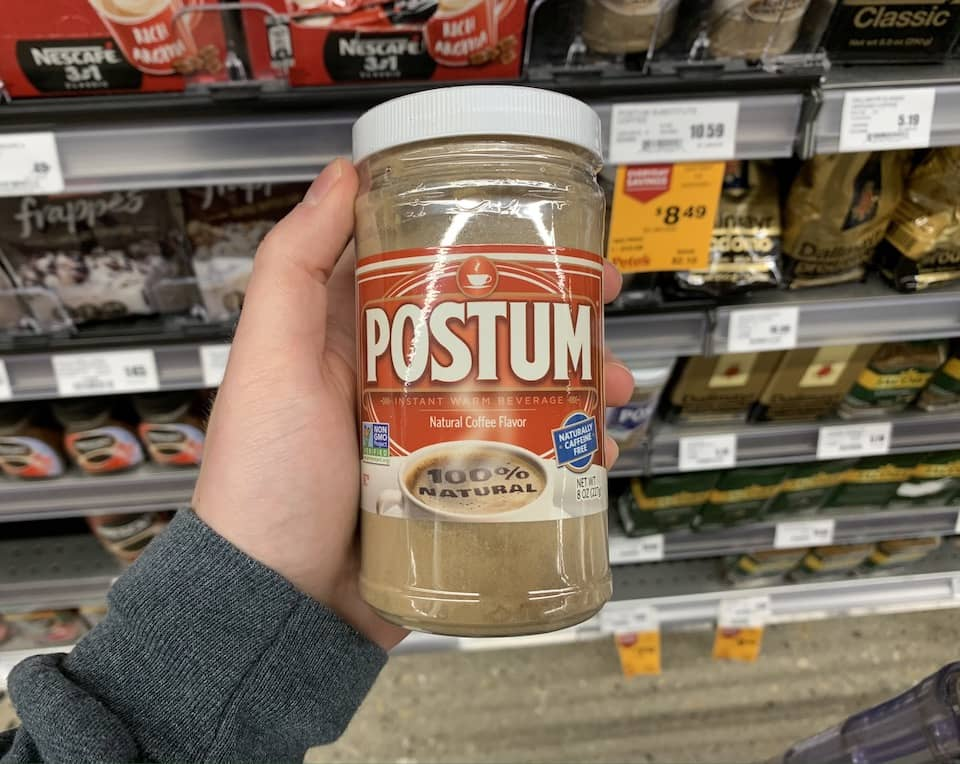

== In popular culture ==
In "All by Herself", episode 14, season 5 of The Facts of Life, Mrs. Garrett offers the girls a nice, piping hot cup of Postum.

In "The Pez Dispenser", episode 14, season 3 of Seinfeld, George and Jerry briefly discuss how Postum is underrated as a drink.

In “Homer the Smithers”, episode 17, season 7 of The Simpsons, Homer becomes Mr. Burns’ assistant. In a montage of Homer’s ineptitude on the job, Mr. Burns throws a drink in Homer’s face, shouting: “You call this Postum?!”

== See also ==
- Barleycup
- Caro (sold as Pero in the United States)
- Coffee substitute
- Inka
- List of barley-based drinks
- Ovaltine
- Roasted grain drink
