= Caro (drink) =

Brand of roasted grain drink

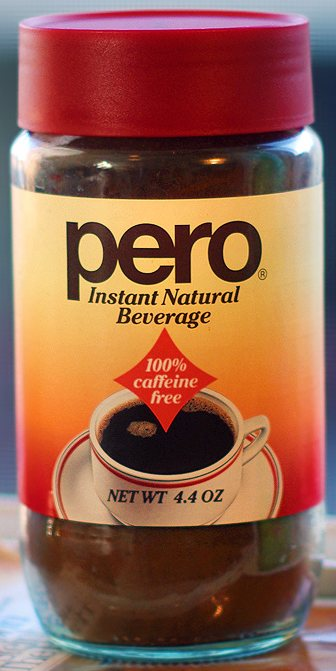
- Caro as sold under the name Pero in the U.S. by InterNatural Foods
- Food energy (per 100 g serving): 256 kcal (1,070 kJ)
Nutritional value
(per 100 g serving)
- Protein: 5.5 g
- Fat: 0.3 g
- Carbohydrate: 60 g

Caro is a brand of roasted grain drink, a caffeine-free coffee substitute made of roasted barley, malted barley, chicory, and rye. It is manufactured by Nestlé and was first introduced in West Germany in 1954. It is available throughout Europe as well as other markets including New Zealand and Australia. It is imported to the United States under the name Pero and sold in Spain as Eko.

Caro is available as an instant powder or as Caro Extra in granulated form. The name "Caro" references the German word "Karo", the term for the diamonds playing card suit, as seen in stylized form in the product logos used in Germany and the United States, and in the Spanish product until the early 2000 when the branding was restyled.

== History ==
The company's history goes back to the time of Frederick II, who imposed high taxes on coffee beans. The company's founder, Johann Heinrich Franck, found a coffee alternative in chicory, which was mixed with grain and roasted. In 1828 production started in Vaihingen an der Enz and in 1868 it was relocated to Ludwigsburg because of the better transport connections.

The brewable Linde's grain coffee, which is still colloquially called Muckefuck in parts of Germany, comes from the same house. With this, however, the war and post-war period was associated. A new brand name was therefore sought for the soluble substitute coffee in 1954 and formed from components of the word coffee substitute extract (with a C instead of the introductory K): Caro.

In 2012, 114 employees were employed in the Ludwigsburg plant, producing around 8,000 tons of Caro coffee, Kathreiner malt coffee and Linde's grain coffee.

For the brand, long-standing signature music in advertising was a textually rewritten version of the song I like by Volker Lechtenbrink, who also interpreted the advertising song.

In June 2018, Nestlé announced that it would close the Ludwigsburg plant at the end of 2018 and relocate production to Portugal.

== See also ==
- Barleycup
- Inka (beverage)
- List of barley-based drinks
- Postum
