= Coffee substitute =

Non-coffee products used to imitate coffee

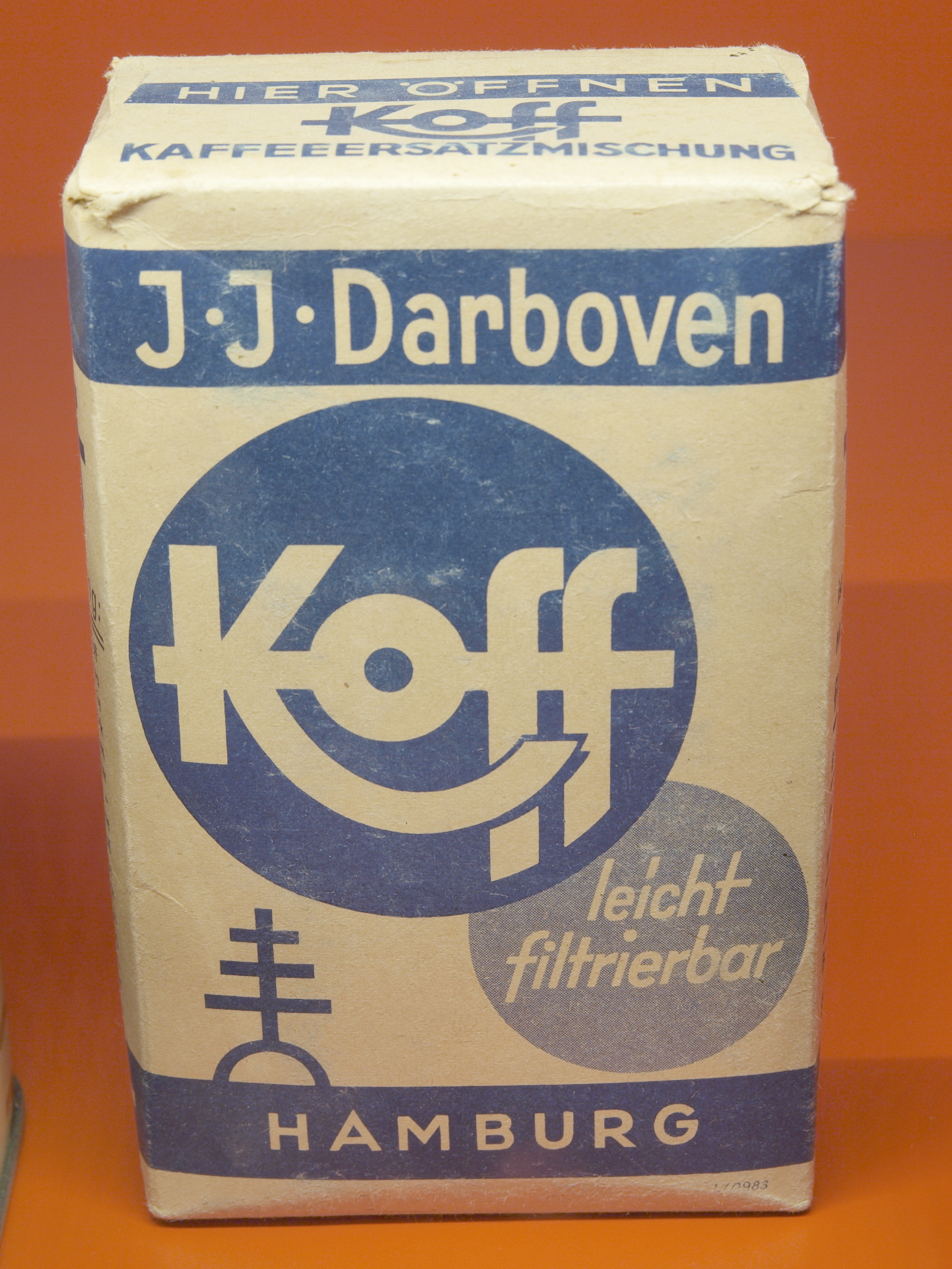
German coffee substitute, Koff, by J.J. Darboven (mid 20th century)

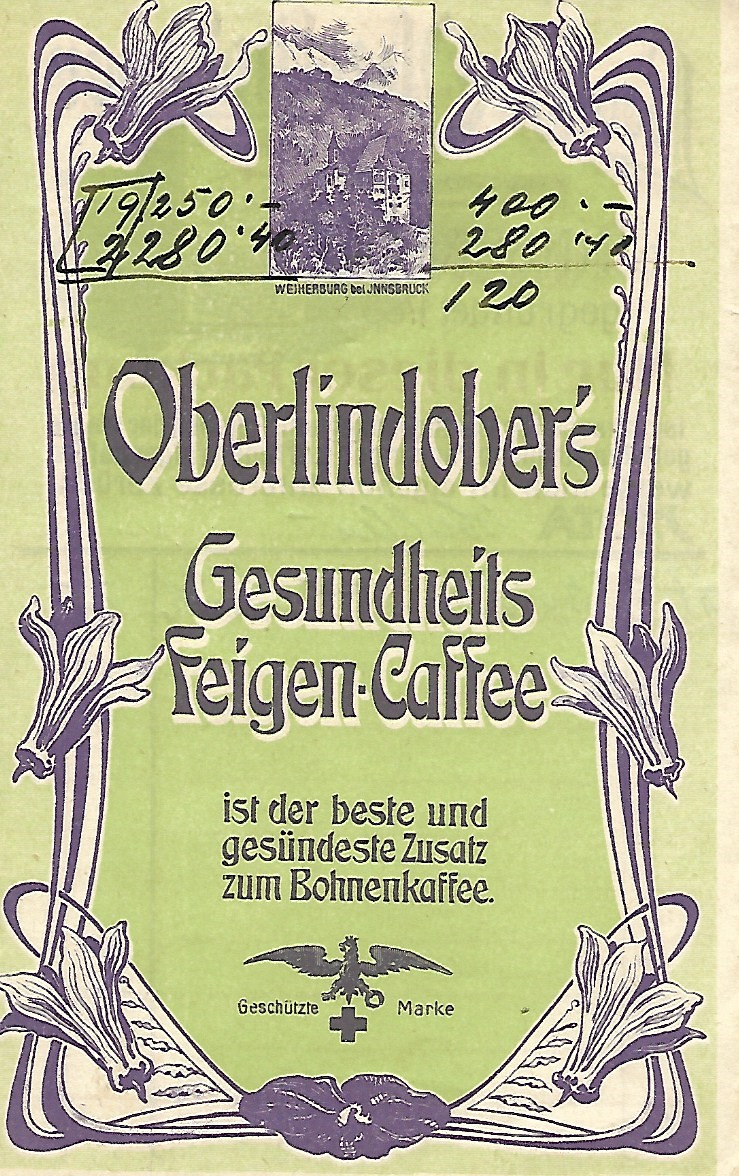
German coffee substitute, Feigen-Caffee, historical advertisement (late 19th century)

Coffee substitutes are non-coffee products, usually without caffeine, that are used to imitate coffee. Coffee substitutes can be used for medical, economic and religious reasons, or simply because coffee is not readily available. Roasted grain beverages are common substitutes for coffee.

In World War II, acorns were used to make coffee in parts of Europe, as well as roasted chicory and grain. Postum, a bran and molasses beverage, also became a popular coffee substitute during this time. During the American Civil War coffee was also scarce in the Southern United States:

For the stimulating property to which both tea and coffee owe their chief value, there is unfortunately no substitute; the best we can do is to dilute the little stocks which still remain, and cheat the palate, if we cannot deceive the nerves.

— "Substitutes for Coffee", The Southern Banner, 1865

Things like rye and ground sweet potato were some of the most popular substitutes at this time.

Coffee substitutes are sometimes used in preparing food and drink served to children, to people who believe that coffee is unhealthy, and to people who avoid caffeine for religious reasons. The Church of Jesus Christ of Latter-day Saints (LDS Church) advises its members to refrain from drinking coffee, as church doctrine interprets a prohibition against "hot drinks" to include coffee in all forms. The Seventh-day Adventist Church has traditionally regarded caffeine as an unhealthful substance, and advised its members to avoid all food and drink containing caffeine, including coffee, although younger members do consume coffee.

Some Asian culinary traditions include beverages made from roasted grain instead of roasted coffee beans (including barley tea, corn tea, and brown rice tea); these do not substitute for coffee but fill a similar niche as a hot aromatic drink (optionally sweetened).

== Ingredients ==
Grain coffee and other substitutes can be made by roasting or decocting various organic substances.

Some ingredients used include almond, acorn, asparagus, malted barley, beechnut, beetroot, carrot, chicory root, corn, soybeans, cottonseed, dandelion root (see dandelion coffee), fig, roasted garbanzo beans, lupinus, boiled-down molasses, okra seed, pea, persimmon seed, potato peel, rye, sassafras pits, sweet potato, wheat bran.

== History ==
The Native American people of what is now the Southeastern United States brewed a ceremonial drink containing caffeine, "asi", or the "black drink", from the roasted leaves and stems of Ilex vomitoria (Yaupon holly). European colonists adopted this beverage as a coffee-substitute, which they called "cassina".

A coffee substitute from ground, roasted chickpeas was mentioned by a German writer in 1793.

Dandelion coffee is attested as early as the 1830s in North America.

The drink brewed from ground, roasted chicory root has no caffeine, but is dark and tastes much like coffee. It was used as a medicinal tea before coffee was introduced to Europe. Use of chicory as a coffee substitute became widespread in France early in the 19th century due to coffee shortages resulting from the Continental Blockade. It was used during the American Civil War in Louisiana, and remains popular in New Orleans. Chicory mixed with coffee is also popular in South India, and is known as Indian filter coffee.

Acorns have historically been used as a substitute for coffee in parts of Europe. Their use as a coffee substitute is documented in eighteenth-century Sweden, where acorns were among the locally available ingredients proposed as alternatives to imported coffee. During the Second World War, roasted acorns were used to prepare coffee substitutes in parts of Europe, where shortages of imported coffee encouraged the use of locally available ingredients. These beverages were known as Ersatzkaffee (substitute coffee). Acorn-based beverages have also been investigated as coffee substitutes in modern food science. Research published in 2019 examined roasted acorns of the Colombian oak Quercus humboldtii, identifying aromatic compounds associated with roasted coffee.

Postum is an instant type of coffee substitute made from roasted wheat bran, wheat and molasses. It reached its height of popularity in the United States during World War II when coffee was sharply rationed.

During the Cold War, coffee was a luxury good in the European countries of the Eastern Bloc, which were unable to produce their own coffee and had to import it using scarce hard currency. This led to the creation of coffee substitutes like Kaffee-Mix in East Germany and Nechezol in Romania.

== Examples ==
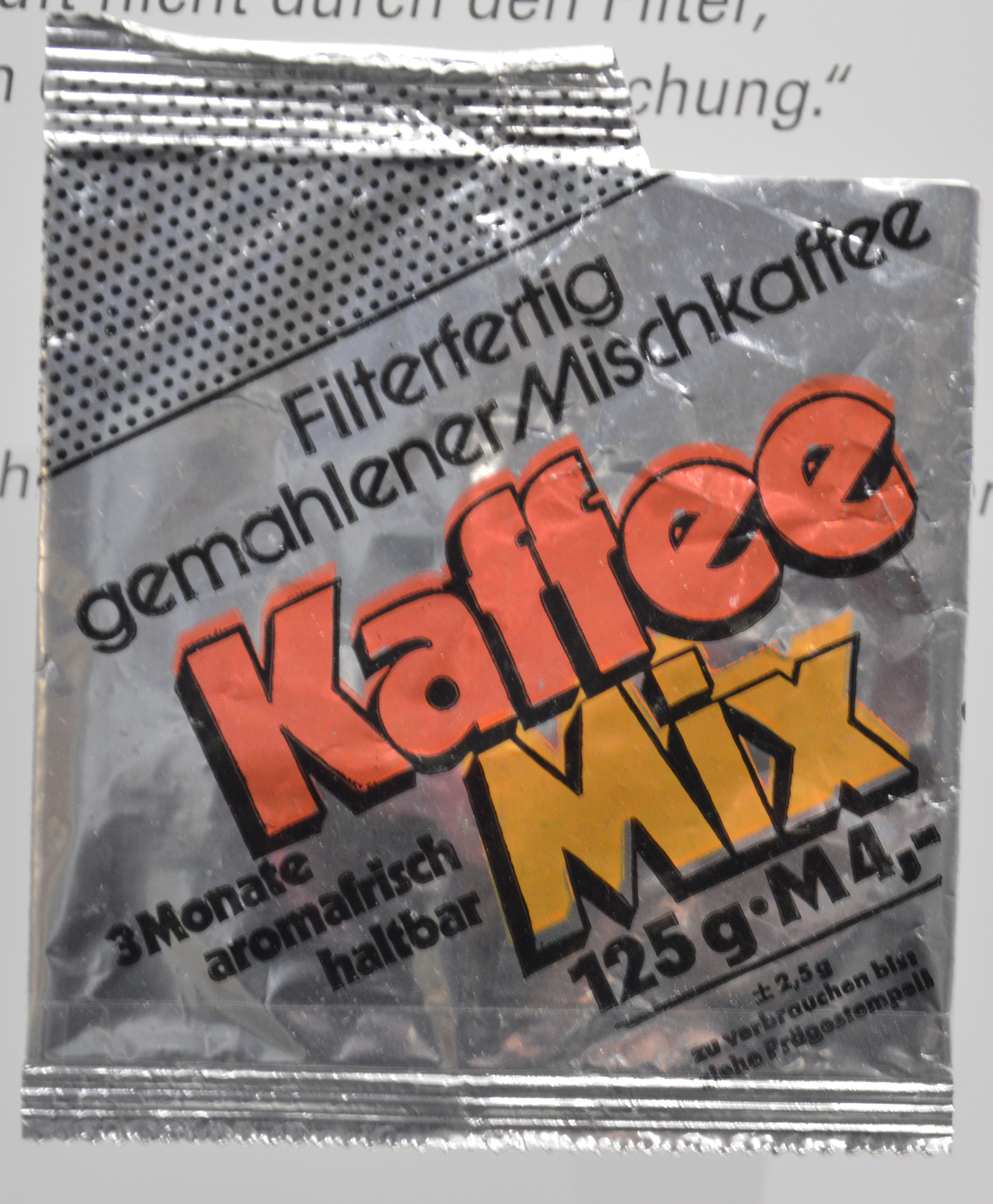
East German "coffee mix" consisting of 51% coffee, produced due to shortages

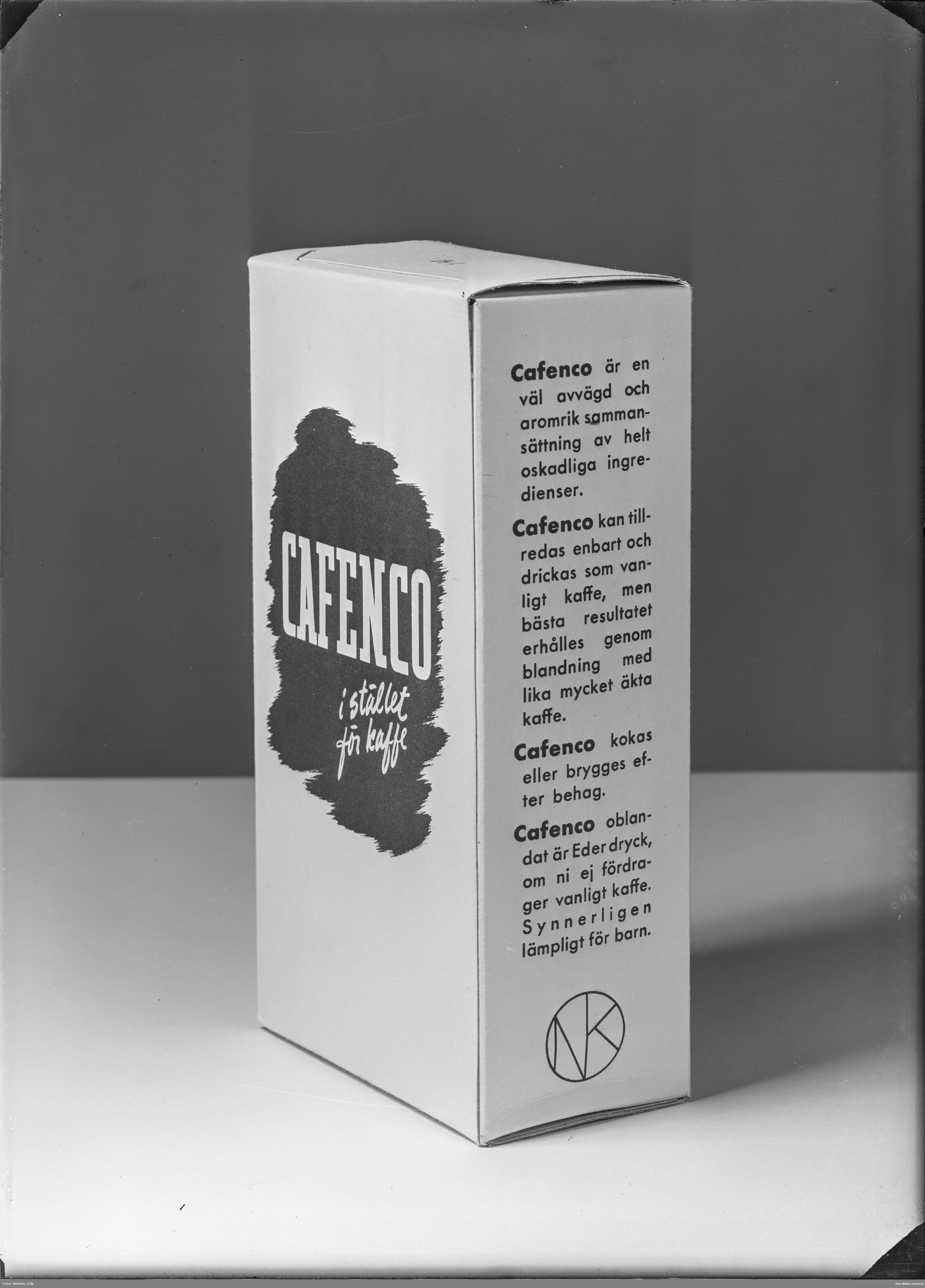
- 1940s product photo of Swedish coffee surrogate brand "Cafenco"
  Roasted grain drinks are prepared from various cereals:
  - Barleycup is a brand of instant drink made from barley, rye, and chicory and sold in the UK.
  - Barley tea is an infusion popular across East Asia and sometimes sold as a coffee substitute.
  - Caffè d'orzo is an espresso-style preparation of roasted barley made in Italy.
  - Nestlé Caro is another brand of instant drink made of roasted barley, malted barley, chicory, and rye.
  - Inka is a Polish drink made of rye, barley, chicory and sugar beet.
  - Postum is an instant wheat bran and molasses drink invented by C. W. Post.
- Infusions or tisanes of other plant material can resemble coffee.
  - Dandelion coffee is a tisane of dandelion roots.
  - Qishr is drink of coffee husks and spices from Yemen.
- Coffee substitutes can be added to true coffee as an adulterant.
  - Camp Coffee is a mix of chicory and coffee from the UK, sold since 1876.
  - Ricoré is a mix of chicory and coffee from France created in 1953, now produced by Nestlé.

=== Synthetic coffee ===
In 2021, media outlets reported that the world's first synthetic coffee products have been created by two biotechnology companies, still awaiting regulatory approvals for near-term commercialization. Such products, which can be produced via cellular agriculture in bioreactors and for which multiple companies' R&D have acquired substantial funding, may have equal or similar effects, composition and taste as natural products but use less water, generate less carbon emissions, require less labour and cause no deforestation. Products that are comparable to naturally grown coffee on the chemical molecular level would not be "coffee substitutes" but differ only in their method of production; hence they would be "lab-grown coffee".

Earlier, in 2019, molecular coffee, made from undisclosed plant-based materials and caffeine, was demonstrated after being developed by an American company, Atomo. However, it is unclear how similar the composition is to coffee on a molecular level or in terms of its effects. It was put on a short temporary sale in 2021.

== Preparation ==
Coffee substitutes may be powder, which dissolves in hot water; grounds, which are brewed like coffee; or grains, left whole to be boiled and steeped like tea.

== See also ==
- Coffee brewing
- Coffee flavoring
- Coffee spice
- East German coffee crisis
- Nechezol
- Ersatz good
- Herbal tea
- List of hot beverages
