= Cereal coffee =

Coffee substitute

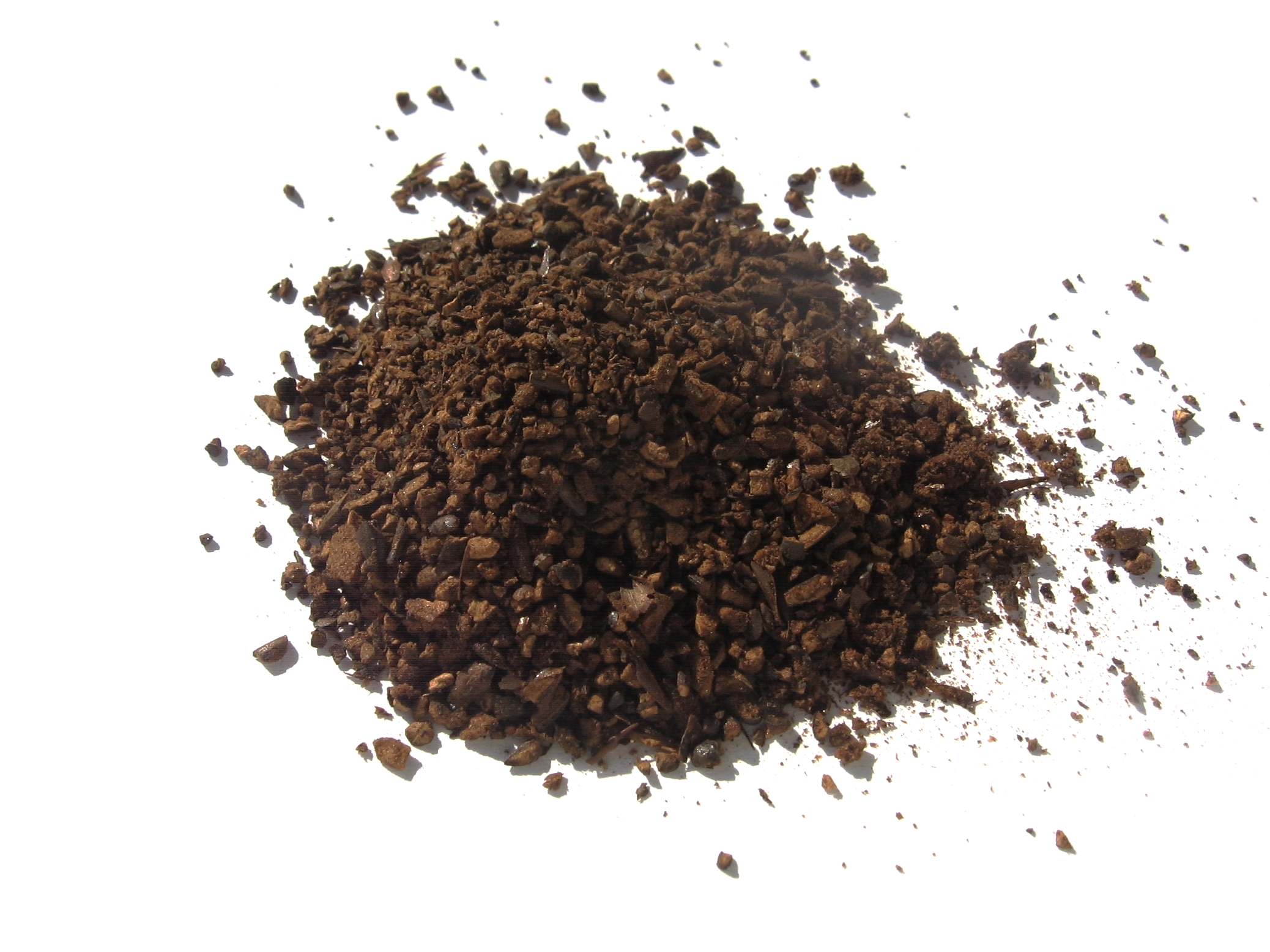
Polish cereal coffee, consisting of roasted rye (60%), barley (20%), chicory root and sugar beetroot

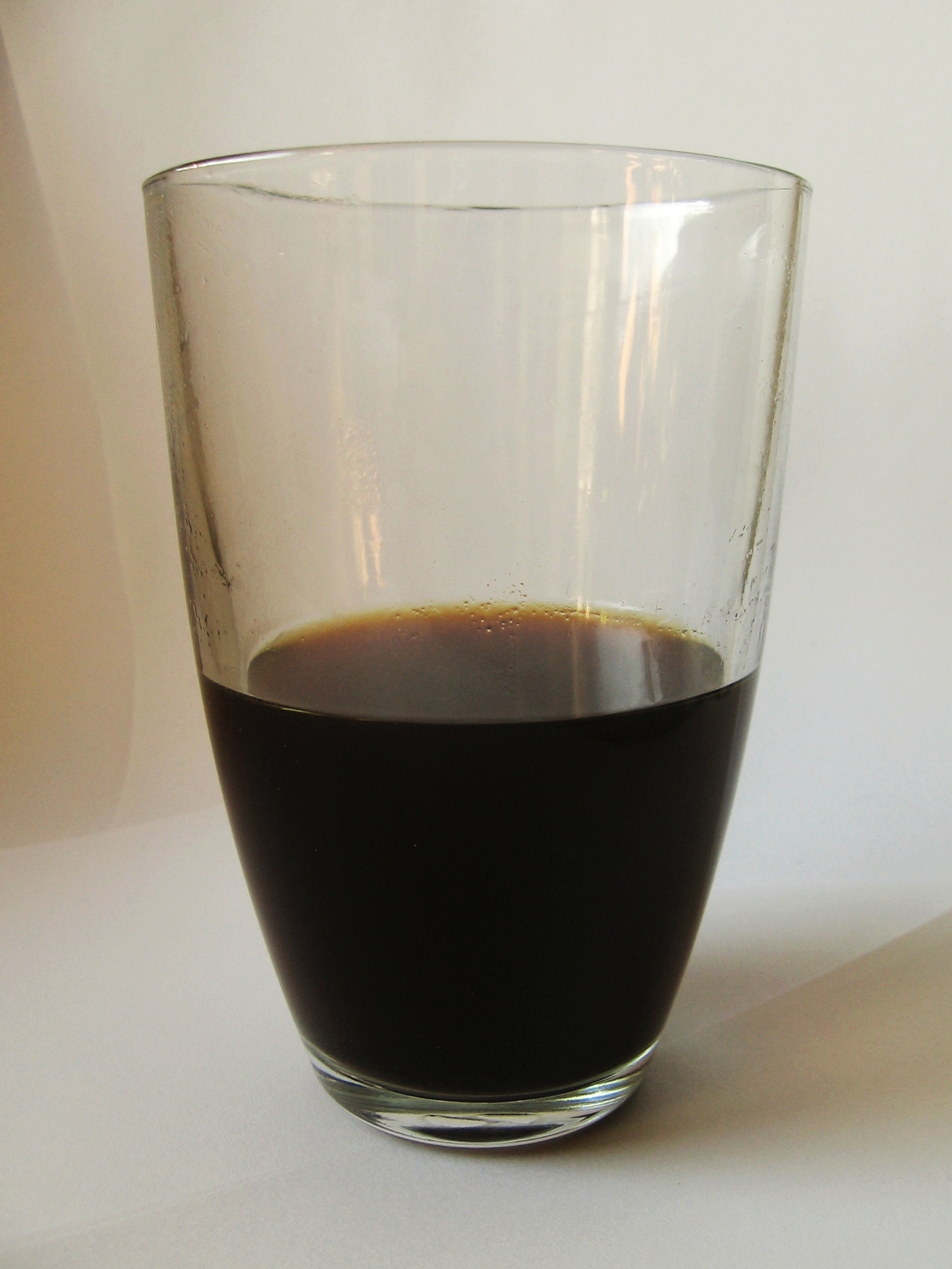
Polish grain coffee brewed using a coffee maker

A cereal coffee (also known as grain coffee, roasted grain drink or roasted grain beverage) is a hot drink made from one or more cereal grains roasted and commercially processed into crystal or powder form to be reconstituted later in hot water. The product is often marketed as a caffeine-free alternative to coffee and tea, or in other cases where those drinks are scarce or expensive.

Several well-known cereal coffee brands are Nestlé Caro, Postum, and Inka. Other brands can be found at health food stores and at some grocery stores. Some common ingredients include toasted barley, malted barley, rye, chicory, molasses, brown rice, chickpeas, sorghum, and beet root.

== Use ==
=== Poland ===
Grain coffee came to Poland from Prussia (at the end of the 18th century), but since then little has changed in the production of this drink. Just like in the past, it is made from roasted rye grains, wheat (including spelt from organic farming) or barley, and sometimes also from dandelion root, sugar beet, or chicory. In some regions, coffee substitutes are prepared from fenugreek or lupine seeds. Less popular additions are figs or acorns. The first grain coffee factory in Poland was established on the initiative of Ferdynand Bohm in 1818 in Włocławek. It produced coffee from roasted grain with the addition of chicory. This plant was first imported from the Netherlands, but soon afterwards its own cultivation began on the outskirts of Włocławek. Initially, grain coffee was drunk only in Greater Poland and Silesia by the poorest social classes. Over time, especially during both world wars, it appeared on all tables.

In the Czech Republic, the Kávoviny Melta brand has been roasting grain coffee since 1896.

Such roasted grain mixes are also used as a base to make podpiwek, a type of non-alcoholic beverage.

=== East Asia ===
Cereal coffee is popular in East Asian cuisines—Korea, Japan, and China each having one or more versions (usually roasted grains simply steeped in hot water).

- Barley tea (bori-cha, dàmài-chá, mugi-cha)
- Rice tea
  - Brown rice tea (hyeonmi-cha, nước gạo lứt)
  - Sungnyung
- Corn tea (oksusu-cha)
- Job's tears tea (yulmu-cha)

Grain-like seeds and pseudocereals are used to make similar drinks.

- Buckwheat tea (memil-cha, soba-cha)
- Sicklepod tea (gyeolmyeongja-cha)

Grain teas can also be blended with green tea or other tea drinks.

- Brown rice green tea (hyeonmi-nokcha)
  - Genmaicha

=== Ethiopia ===
Traditionally known as "Kafir Coffee"in Ethiopia, cereal coffee made from roasted sorghum has a bright, citrusy taste with an astringent finish.

- Sorghum

=== Malaysia ===
The rural Lun Bawang people of Ba'kelalan, northeast of Sarawak has developed a beverage from steeping roasted local Adan rice that yields a taste similar to black coffee.

=== Philippines ===
Corn coffee (kape mais) made from roasted and ground kernels of the Visayan white corn variety is a common drink among farmers in the Philippines.

== See also ==
- Coffee substitute
- Ersatz good – Low quality substitute good
- Grain milk
- List of barley-based drinks
- Mash ingredients
