= Rice tea =

Rice tea may refer to:

- Brown rice tea, an infusion made from roasted brown rice
- Genmaicha, a Japanese green tea and toasted brown rice mixture

== See also ==
- Tea Over Rice
