= 玄米茶 =

玄米茶 is an East Asian tea made from brown rice.

玄米茶 may refer to:

- Genmaicha, a Japanese green tea combined with roasted brown rice, sometimes also referred to as "popcorn tea"
- Hyeonmi cha, a Korean tisane made from roasted brown rice
