= Sungnyung =

Korean rice infusion

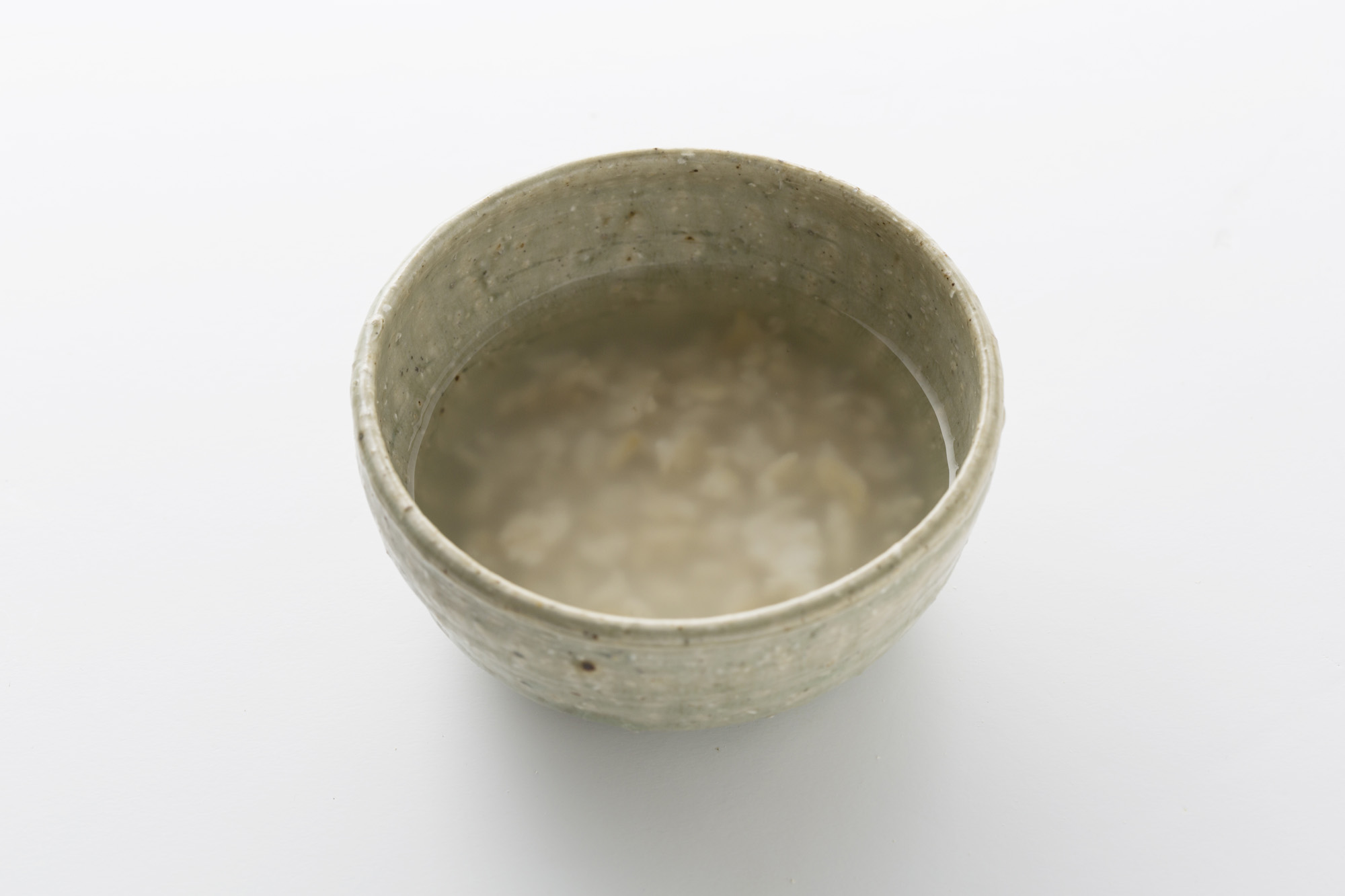

Korean name
- Hangul: 숭늉
- RR: sungnyung
- MR: sungnyung

Sungnyung (Korean: 숭늉) is a traditional Korean infusion made from boiled scorched rice.

== Preparation ==
This drink is typically made from nurungji, the roasted (but not charred) crust of rice that forms on the bottom of a pot after cooking rice. Water is poured on this brown crust and the contents are put to a simmer until the water gains enough flavor of the scorched rice.

Making sungnyung from dolsot-bap

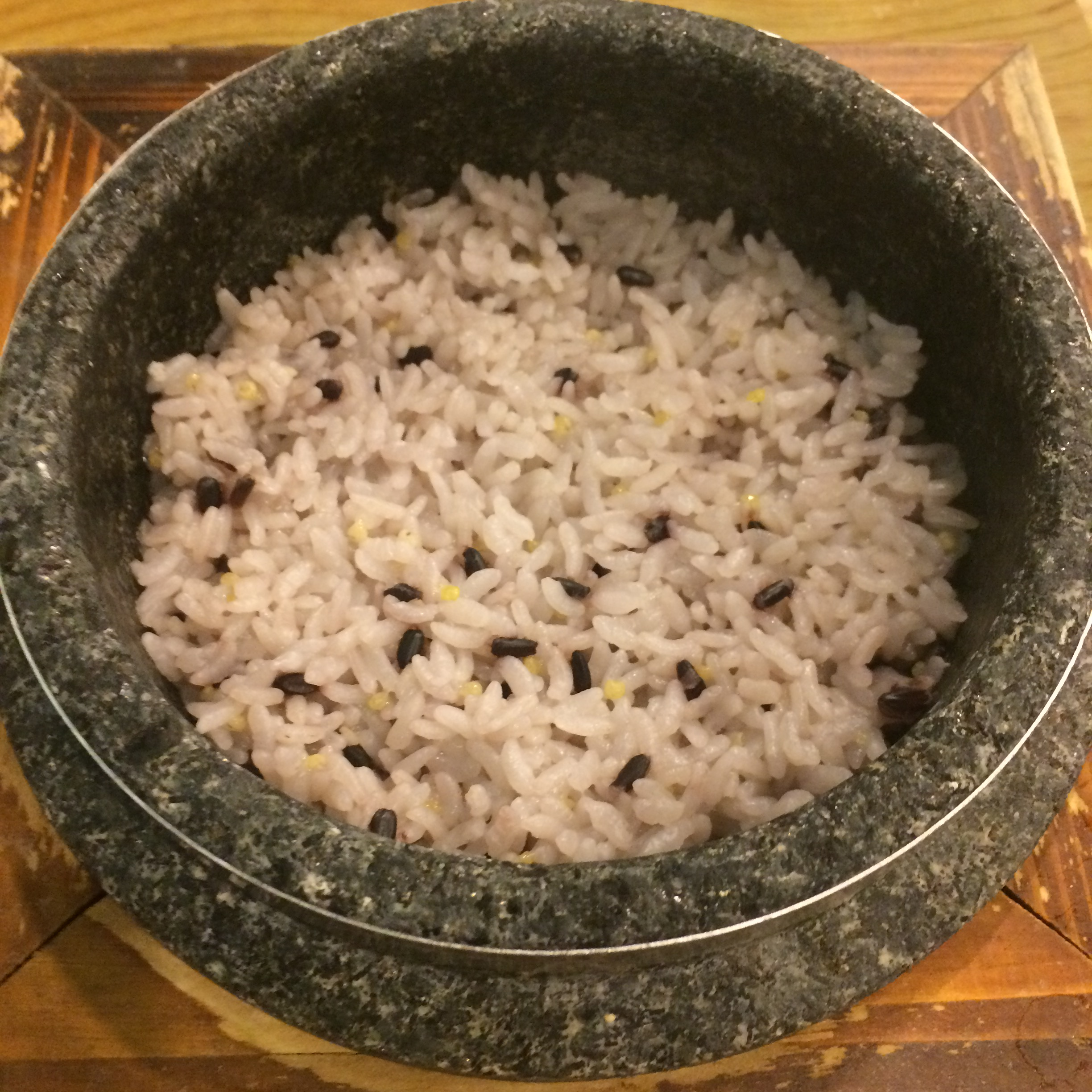
Dolsot-bap (stone bowl rice)

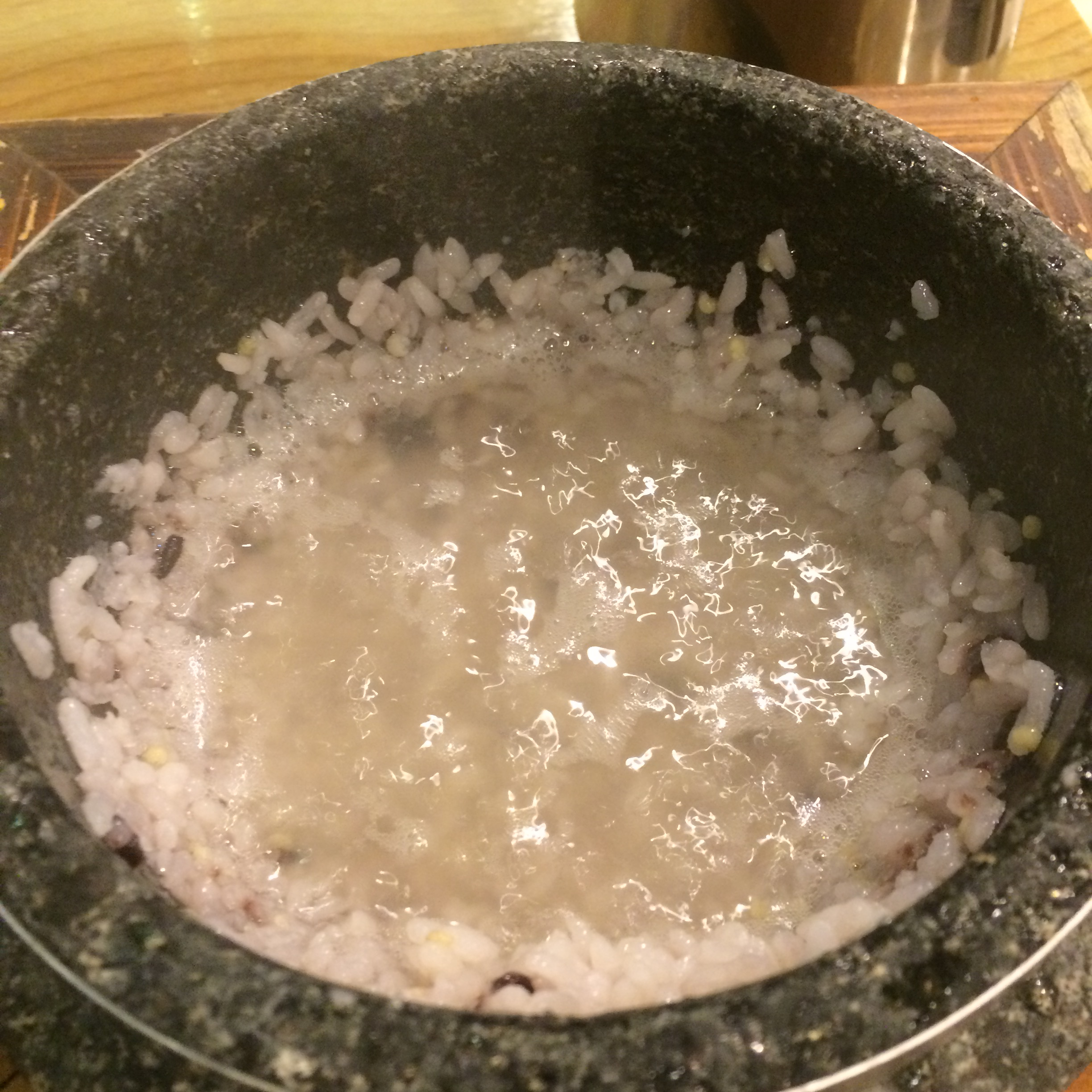
Pouring hot water on nurungji (scorched rice)

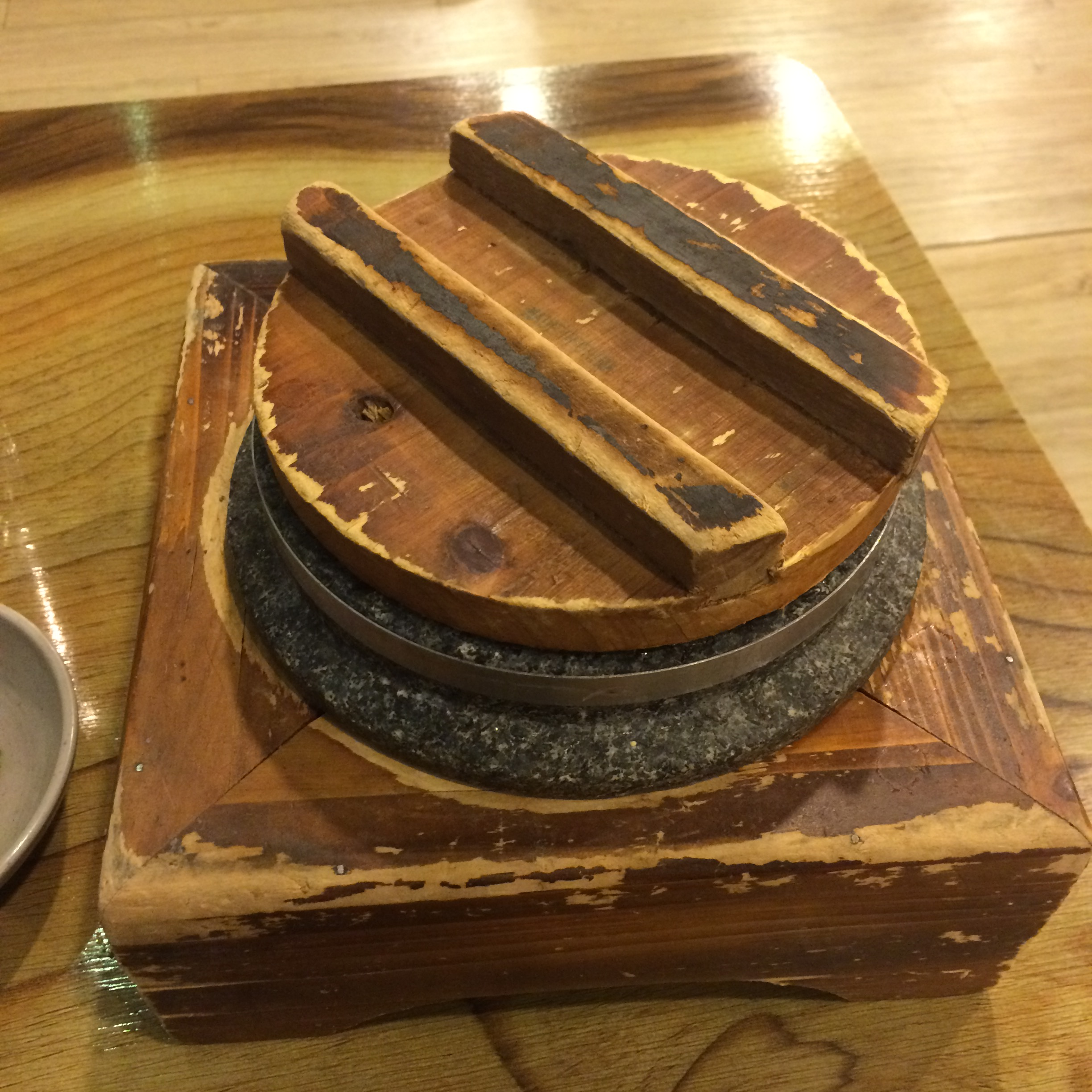
Closing the lid of dolsot

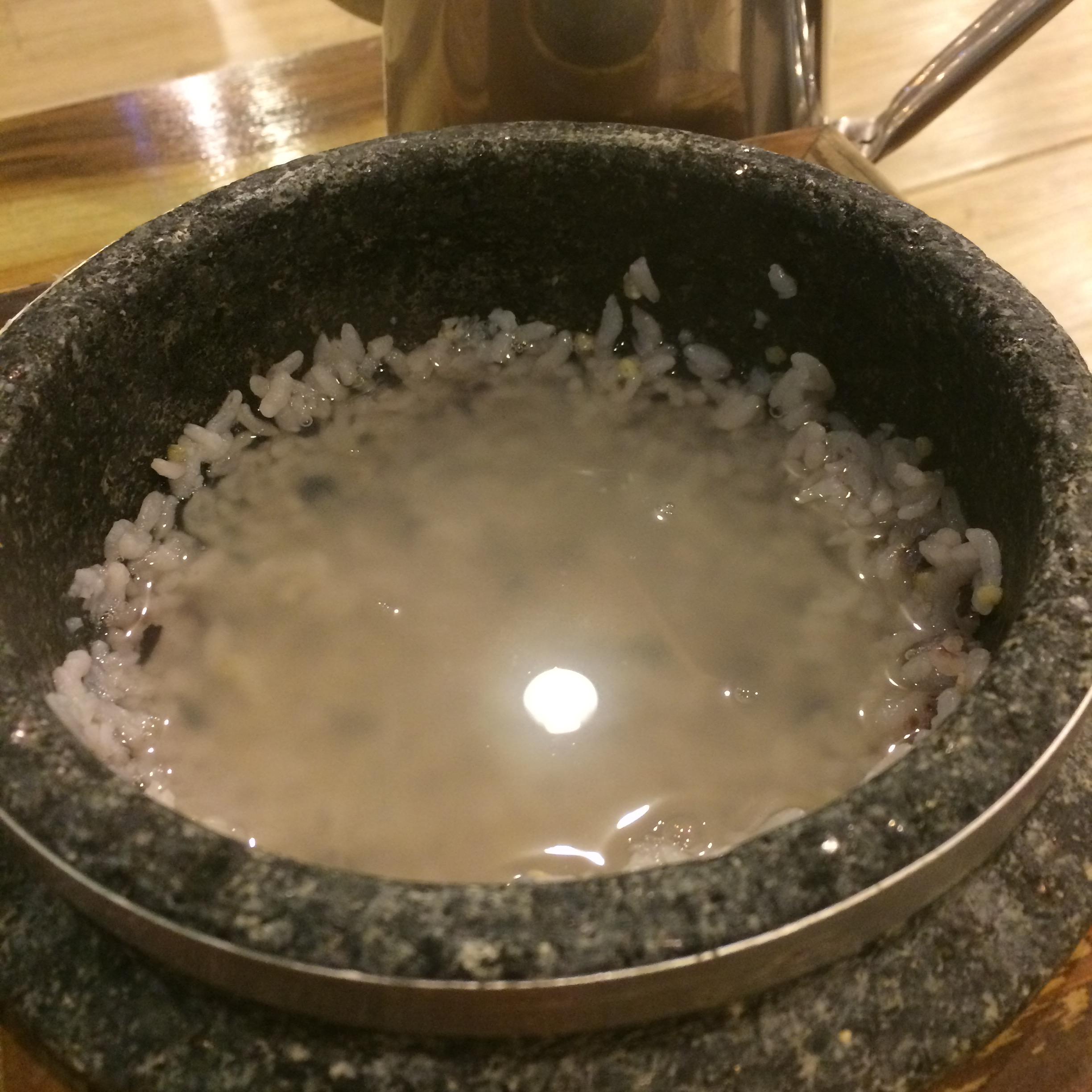
Brewed sungnyung in dolsot

== History ==
Records of sungnyung can be found in the late Joseon era documents of Imwŏn kyŏngjeji (임원경제지).

Rice in Korea was traditionally made by using a heavy iron cauldron (like a Dutch oven), with the rice being cooked until all water had been boiled away and a crust made on the bottom of the pot. Making sungnyung would not only prevent waste of the remaining rice that was sticking to the pot, it would also naturally clear out the pot's insides which made cleaning easier. As sungnyung was made after rice had been served, it was typically served after the meal.

The consumption of sungnyung waned as nickel-silver pots and modern electric rice cookers gained popularity, as they do not generally leave a layer of roasted crust after the rice is steamed. However, in the late 20th century sungnyung began to gain popularity again and many electric rice cookers now come with the ability to cook sungnyung. Prepackaged nurungji are also commercially available and can be used to make sungnyung in a short of amount of time by just adding boiling water.

== See also ==
- Bori-cha, an infusion made from toasted barley
- Genmaicha, a Japanese tea made from toasted brown rice mixed with green tea
- Hyeonmi-cha, a Korean infusion made from toasted brown rice
- Korean cuisine
- Oksusu-cha, a Korean infusion made from toasted corn
- Roasted grain beverage
- Sikhye, a sweet Korean drink made from rice
