= Brown rice green tea =

Green tea blended with roasted brown rice

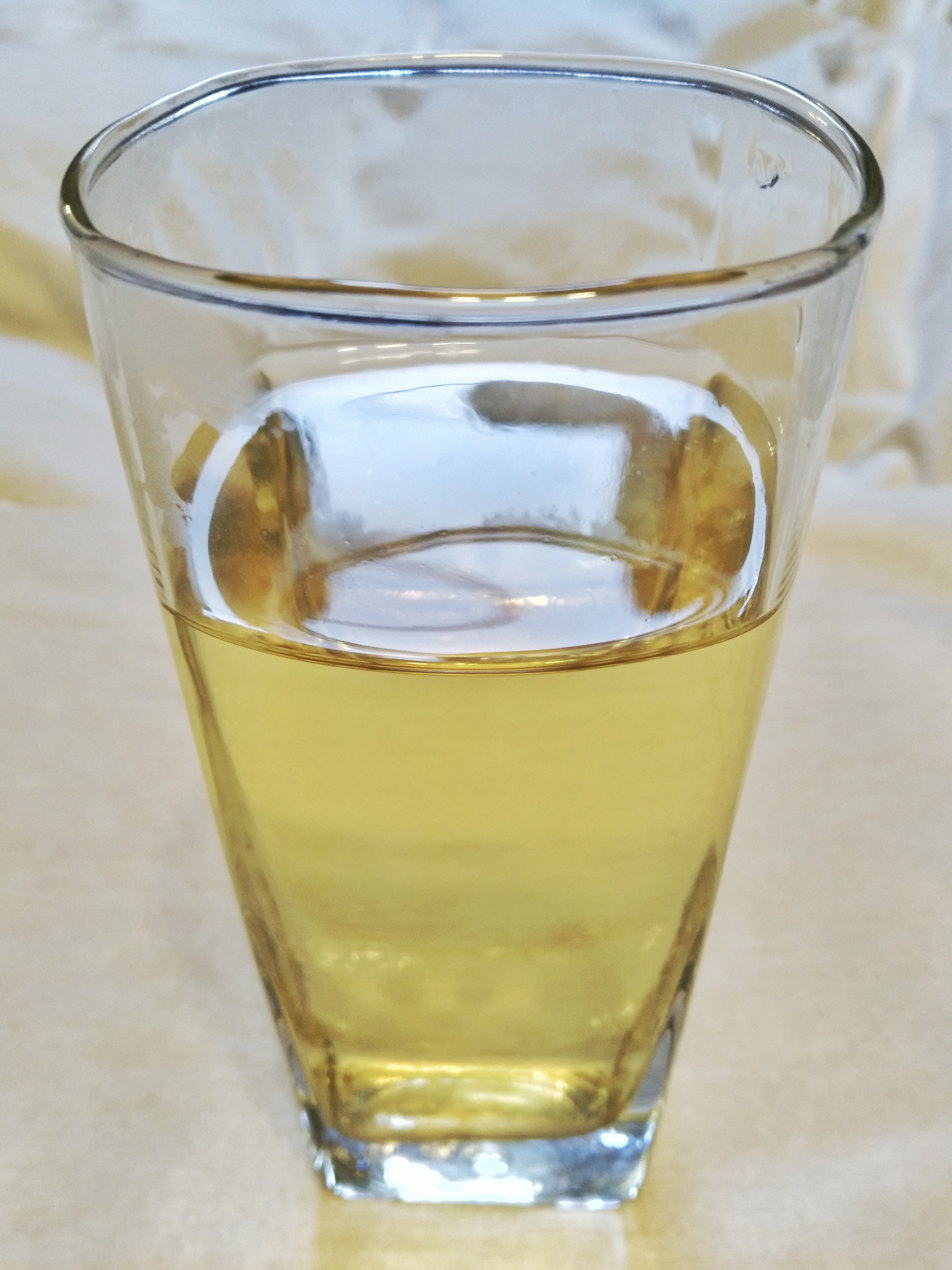
- Type: Green tea; brown rice tea
- Other names: Hyeonmi-nokcha
- Origin: Korea
- Quick description: Green tea blended with roasted brown rice
- Temperature: 80 °C (176 °F)
- Time: 2 minutes

- Brown rice green tea
- Hangul: 현미녹차
- Hanja: 玄米綠茶
- RR: hyeonminokcha
- MR: hyŏnminokch'a
- IPA: hjʌn.mi nok̚.tɕʰa

Brown rice green tea is a green tea blended with roasted brown rice. In Korea, it is called hyeonmi-nokcha (현미녹차, literally "brown rice green tea") and is considered a blend of nokcha (green tea) and hyeonmi-cha (brown rice tea). In Japan, green tea blended with puffed brown rice is called genmaicha (literally, "brown rice tea").

== Preparation ==
In Korea, hyeonmi-nokcha is made by blending jeungje-cha (green tea that was steamed, not roasted, before being dried) leaves and roasted brown rice. Popular in both the loose and tea bag forms, brown rice green tea varieties are produced by Hankook Tea and Sulloc Tea.

== Nutrition ==
200 grams (7.1 oz) of brown rice green tea contains 610 kilocalories (2,600 kJ), 141.6 grams (4.99 oz) carbohydrate, 26 grams (0.92 oz) protein, 6.8 grams (0.24 oz) fat, and 12 milligrams (0.19 gr) sodium. Few of these nutrients will be present in the brewed liquid.

== Gallery ==
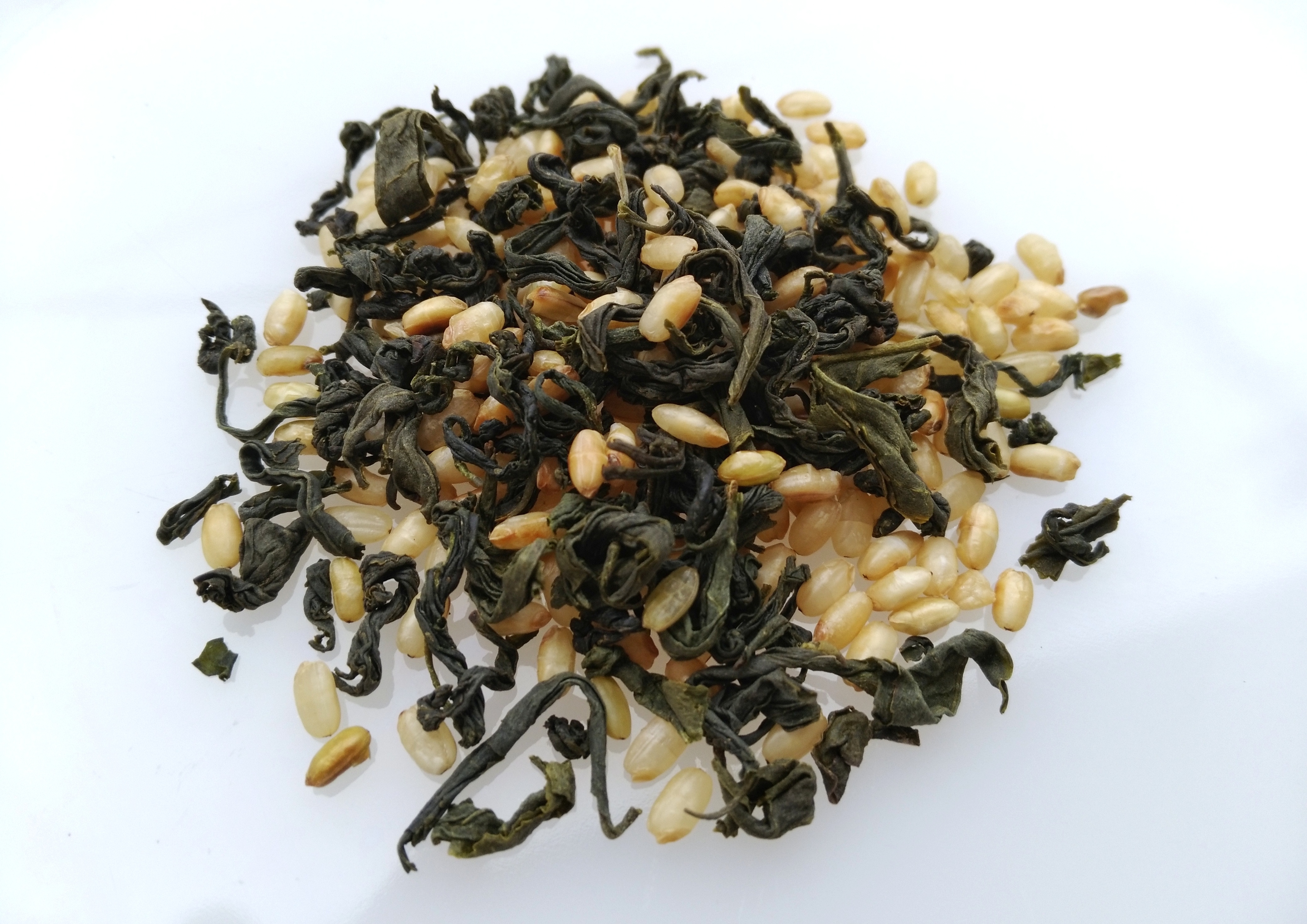
Hyeonmi-nokcha

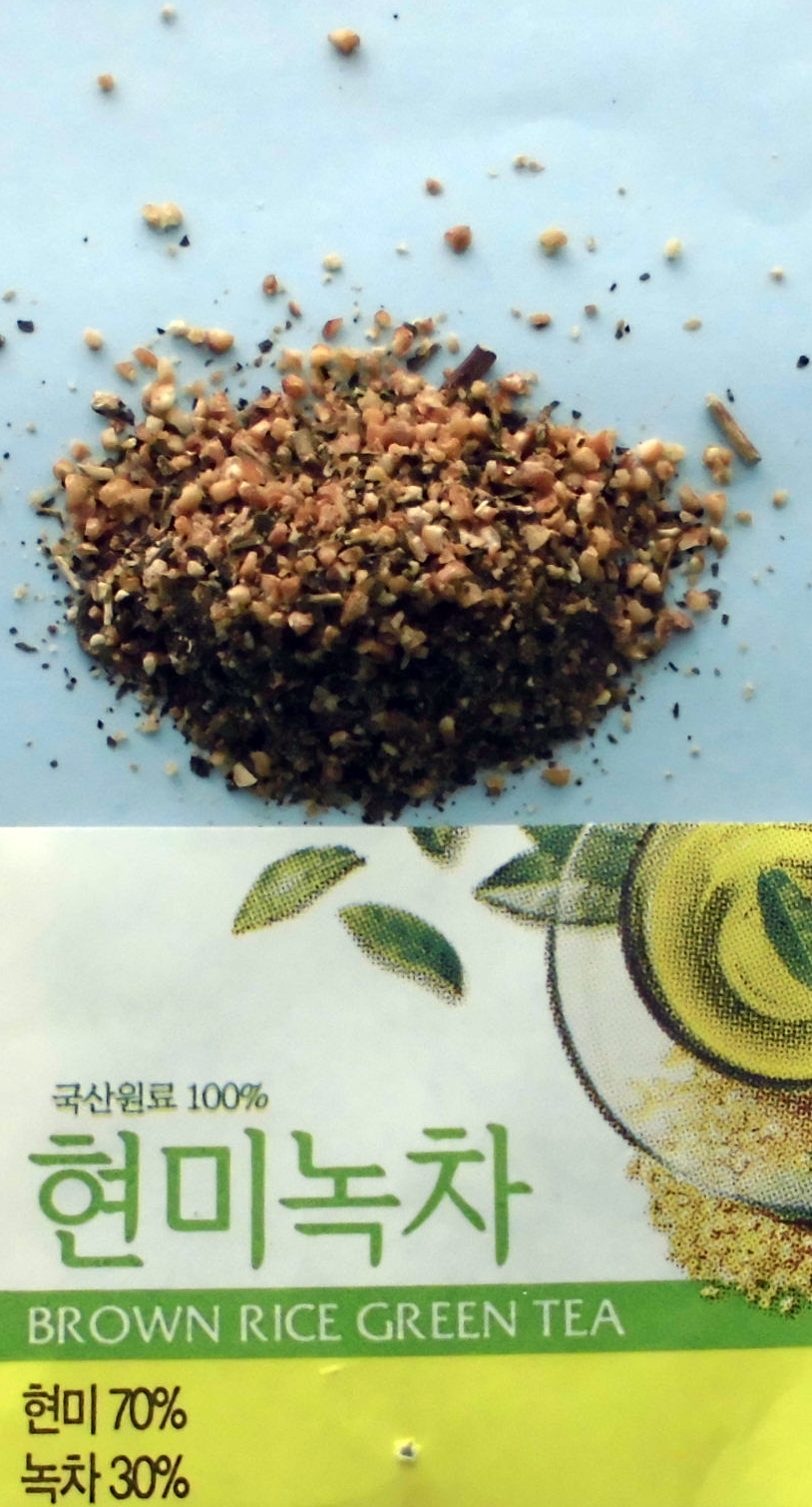
Hyeonmi-nokcha tea bag

== See also ==
- Genmaicha
- Brown rice tea
