= Buckwheat tea =

Beverage made from buckwheat grains

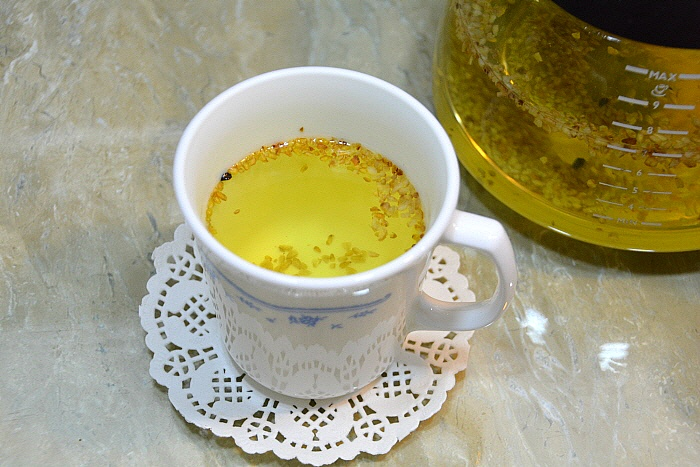
- Type: Herbal tea
- Other names: Memil-cha; soba-cha; kuqiao-cha
- Origin: East Asia
- Quick description: Tea made from roasted buckwheat
- Temperature: 90 °C (194 °F)
- Time: 2‒4 minutes

Korean name
- Hangul: 메밀차
- Hanja: 메밀茶
- RR: memilcha
- MR: memilch'a
- IPA: me.mil.tɕʰa

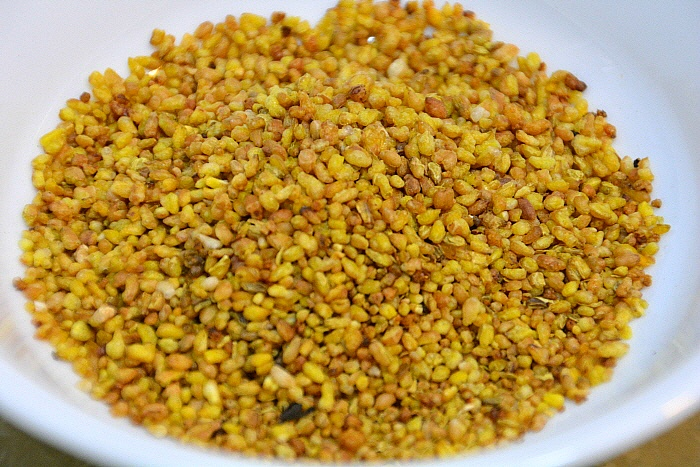
Roasted buckwheat

Buckwheat tea, known as memil-cha (메밀차) in Korea, soba-cha (そば茶) in Japan, and kuqiao-cha (苦荞茶; 苦蕎茶) in China, is a tea made from roasted buckwheat. Like other traditional Korean teas, memil-cha can be drunk either warm or cold and is sometimes served in place of water. Recently, tartari buckwheat grown in Gangwon Province has been popular for making memil-cha, as it is nuttier and contains more rutin.

== Preparation ==
Buckwheat is husked, cooked, and dried then pan-fried without oil. For one part of buckwheat, ten parts of water are used. 5–10 millilitres (0.18–0.35 imp fl oz; 0.17–0.34 US fl oz) of roasted buckwheat is added to 90 °C (194 °F) water and infused for 2–4 minutes.

== See also ==
- Bori-cha – barley tea
- Hyeonmi-cha – brown rice tea
- Oksusu-cha – corn tea
- Cereal coffee
- List of buckwheat dishes
