= Brown rice tea =

Beverage made by infusing rice grains

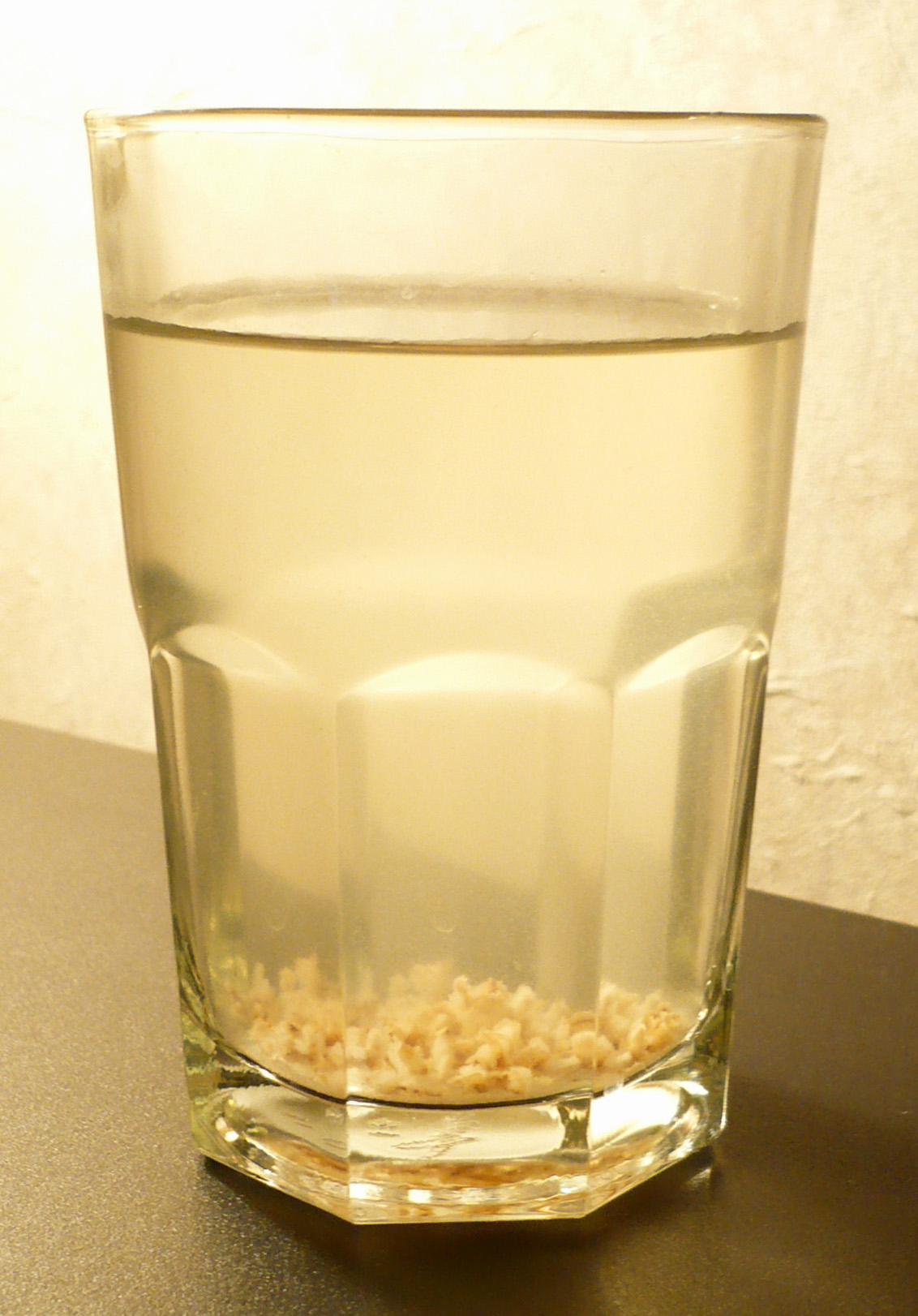
- Type: Herbal tea
- Other names: Hyeonmi-cha; nước gạo lứt; nước gạo lứt rang; nước gạo rang
- Origin: Korea
- Quick description: Tea made from brown rice
- Temperature: 100 °C (212 °F)
- Time: 5 minutes
- Website

Regional names

Vietnamese name
- Vietnamese: 1. nước gạo lứt 2. nước gạo lứt rang 3. nước gạo rang
- Literal meaning: 1. brown rice water 2. roasted brown rice water 3. roasted rice water

Korean name
- Hangul: 현미차
- Hanja: 玄米茶
- Literal meaning: brown rice tea
- Revised Romanization: hyeonmicha
- McCune–Reischauer: hyŏnmich'a

Brown rice tea, called hyeonmi-cha (현미차 [hjʌn.mi.tɕʰa], lit. "brown rice tea") in Korean and nước gạo lứt (lit. "brown rice water"), nước gạo lứt rang (lit. "roasted brown rice water"), or nước gạo rang (lit "roasted rice water") in Vietnamese, is an infusion made from roasted brown rice.

== Preparation ==
This tea is prepared by infusing roasted brown rice in boiling water. Brown japonica rice is typically used in Korea. The rice is washed, soaked, roasted in a dry pan or pot, and cooled. Around 50 g (1.8 oz) of roasted brown rice is added to 600 ml (21 imp fl oz; 20 US fl oz) of boiling water and simmered for a short time, around five to ten minutes. Rice grains may be strained before serving. The beverage may range from pale yellow to light golden brown in color.

Pre-roasted rice used to make hyenomi-cha is available commercially in groceries, traditional markets, and supermarkets in Korea and Korean groceries overseas.

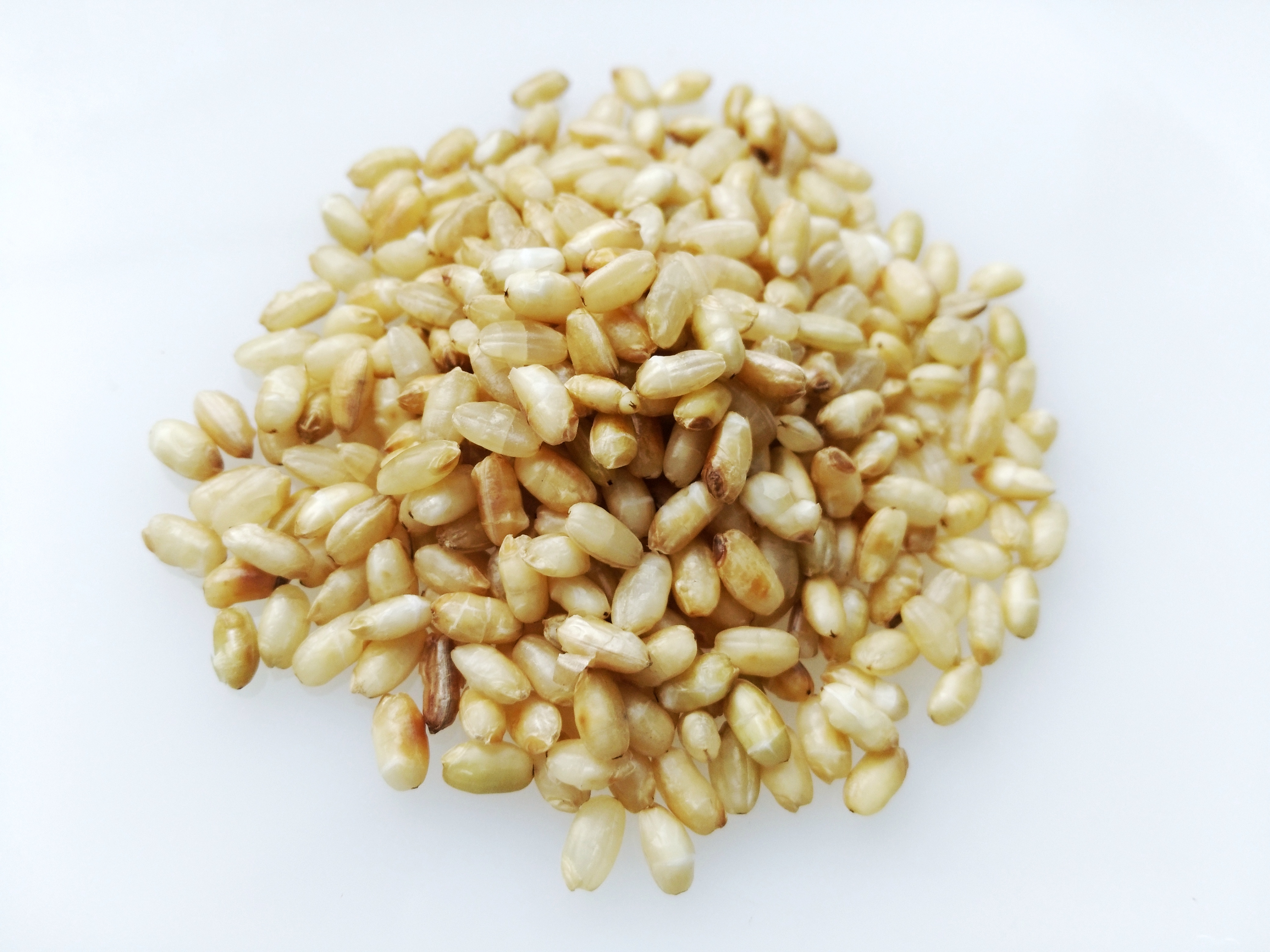
Roasted brown rice

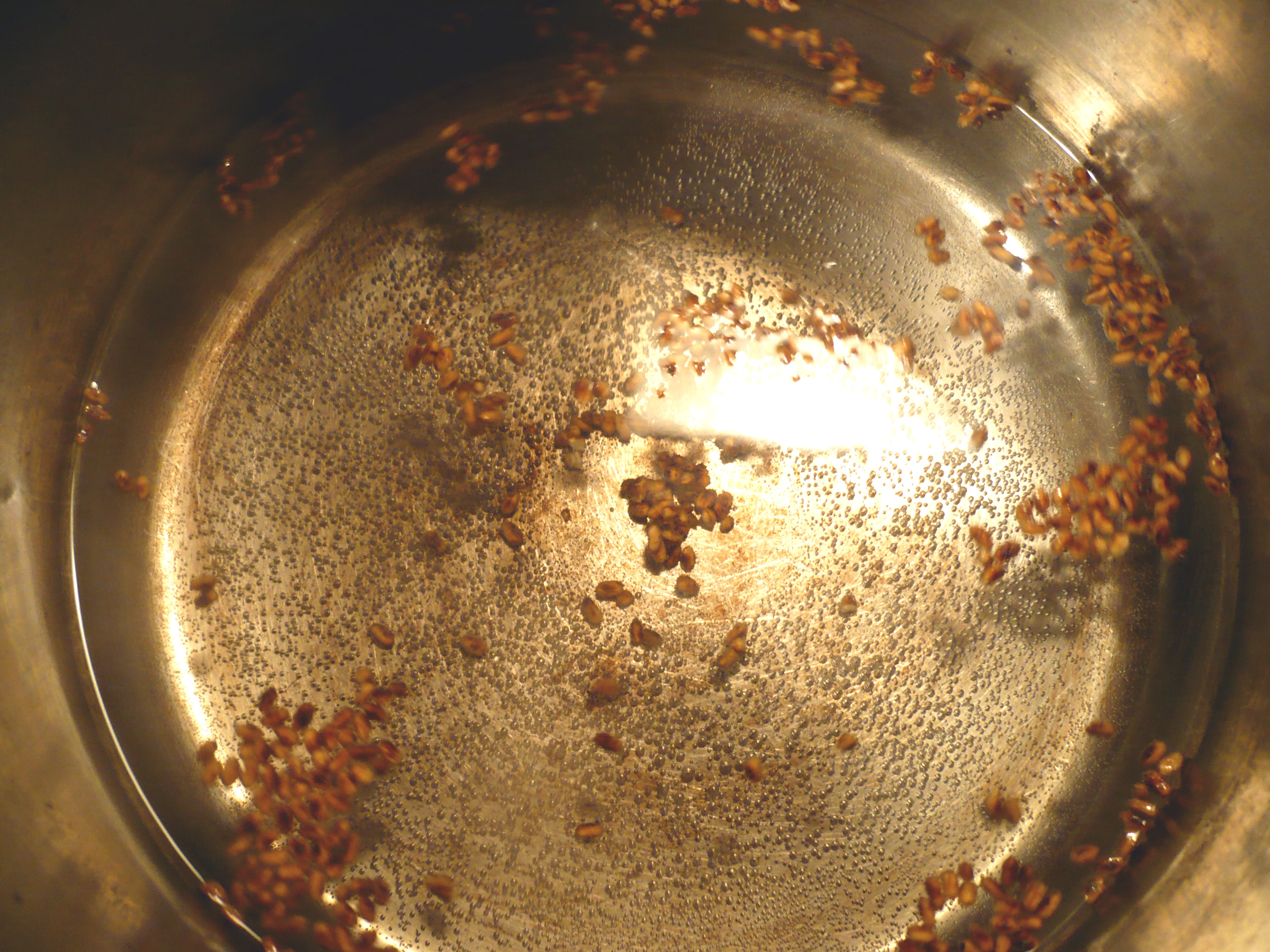
A pot of boiling brown rice tea

== Similar drinks and blends ==
Hyeonmi-cha can be blended with nokcha (green tea) to produce hyeonmi-nokcha (brown rice green tea). In Japan, a similar green tea is called genmaicha, which is a cognate of hyeonmi-cha.

Bori-cha, memil-cha, and oksusu-cha are other traditional Korean teas prepared in a similar way with barley, buckwheat, and corn.

Sungnyung is a drink made from scorched rice. Water is directly added to a pot where the scorched crust of rice—most commonly white rice—is left in the bottom when it is still hot. Unlike hyeonmi-cha, the rice grains are simmered for a relatively long time until soft, and may be consumed together with the liquid.

== See also ==
- Bori-cha – barley tea
- Memil-cha – buckwheat tea
- Oksusu-cha – corn tea
- Roasted grain beverage
