= Corn tea =

Korean grain tea made from maize

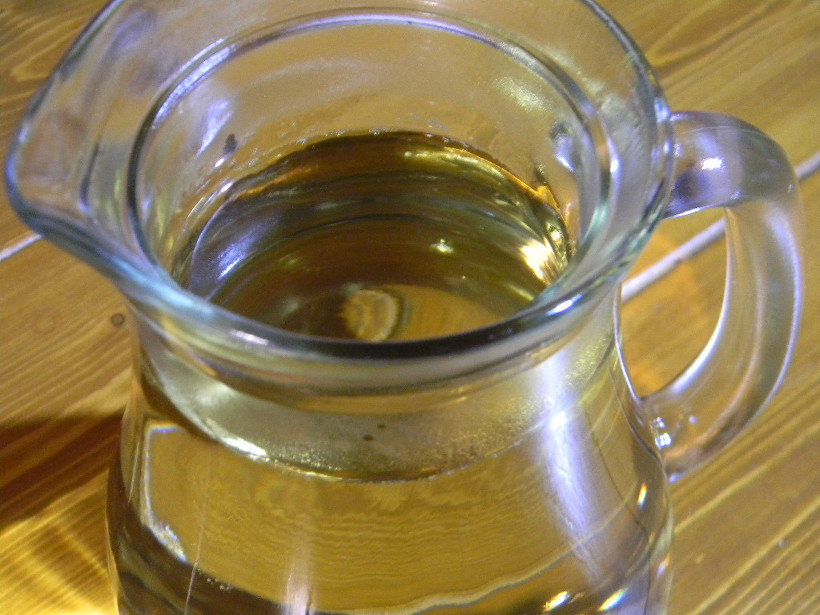
- Type: Herbal tea
- Other names: Oksusu-cha
- Origin: Korea
- Quick description: Tea made from roasted corn kernels
- Temperature: 100 °C (212 °F)
- Time: 5‒10 minutes

- Corn tea
- Hangul: 옥수수차
- Hanja: 옥수수茶
- RR: oksusucha
- MR: oksusuch'a
- IPA: ok.s͈u.su.tɕʰa

Corn silk tea
- Hangul: 옥수수수염차
- Hanja: 옥수수鬚髥茶
- RR: oksususuyeomcha
- MR: oksususuyŏmch'a
- IPA: ok.s͈u.su.su.jʌm.tɕʰa

Oksusu-cha (옥수수차) or corn tea is a Korean tea made from corn. While oksusu-suyeom-cha (옥수수수염차) or corn silk tea refers to the tea made from corn silk, oksusu-cha can be made from corn kernels, corn silk, or a combination of both. The caffeine-free infusion is a popular hot drink in winter.

In Gangwon Province, the tea is called gangnaengi-cha (강냉이차)—gangnaengi is a Gangwon dialect for "corn"—and is consumed throughout late autumn and winter in most households.

== Preparation ==
Traditionally, corn kernels are dried and roasted to prepare oksusu-cha. The roasted corn kernels are then boiled in water until the tea turns yellow. The tea is then strained and the boiled corn discarded. Although the drink is naturally sweet, sugar is sometimes added when a sweeter flavor is desired.

Roasted corn kernels are available at groceries, traditional markets and supermarkets in Korea, as well as at Korean groceries abroad. Tea bags containing ground corn are also commercially available.

== Blends ==
Oksusu-cha is often combined with bori-cha (barley tea), as the corn's sweetness offsets the slightly bitter flavor of the barley.

== Gallery ==
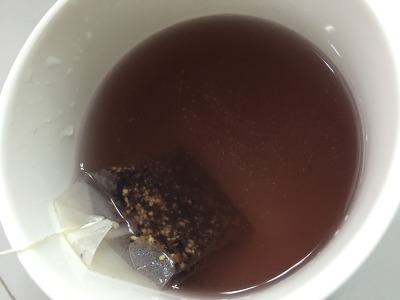
Jasaek-oksusu-cha (purple corn tea) tea bag

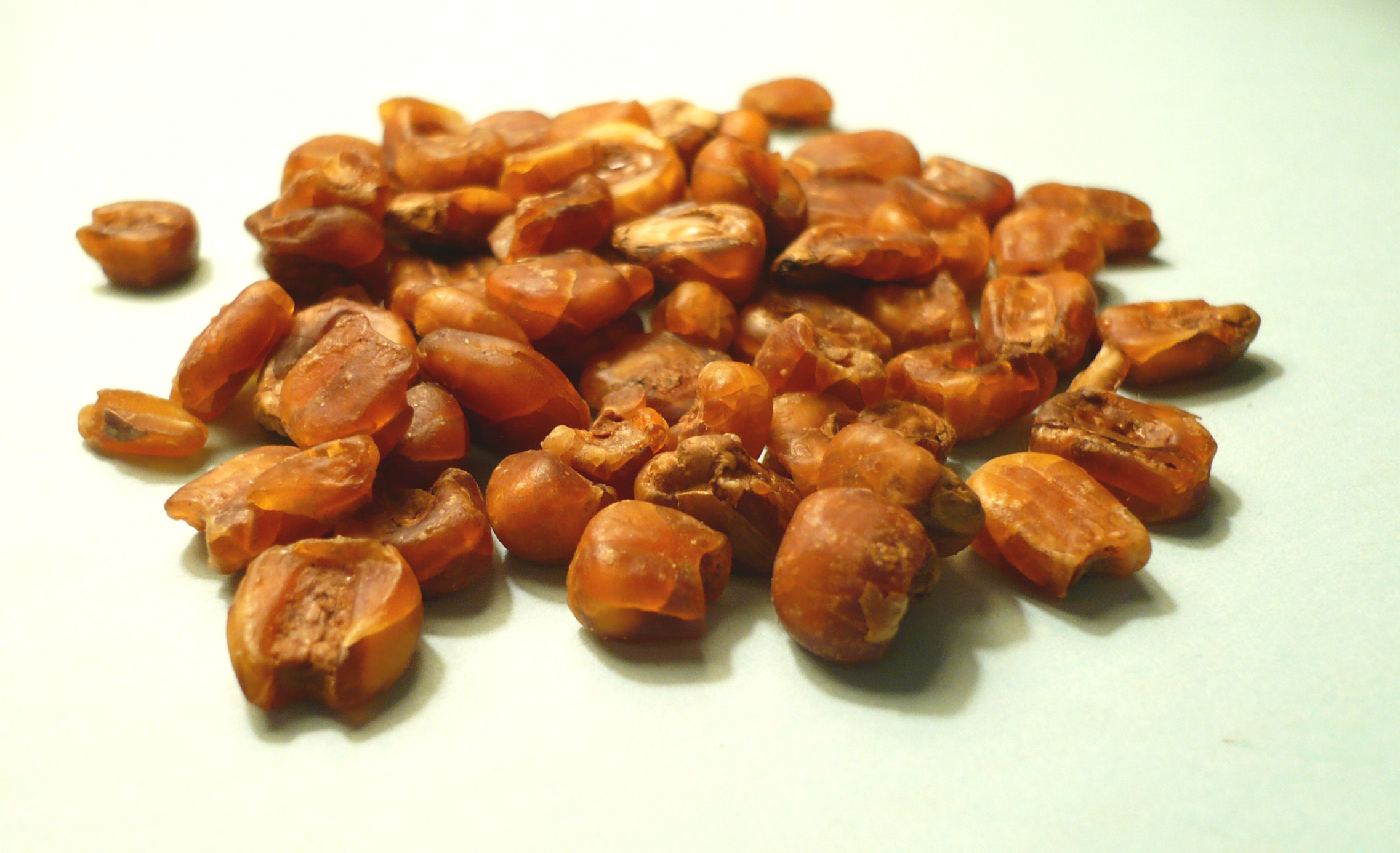
Roasted corn kernels

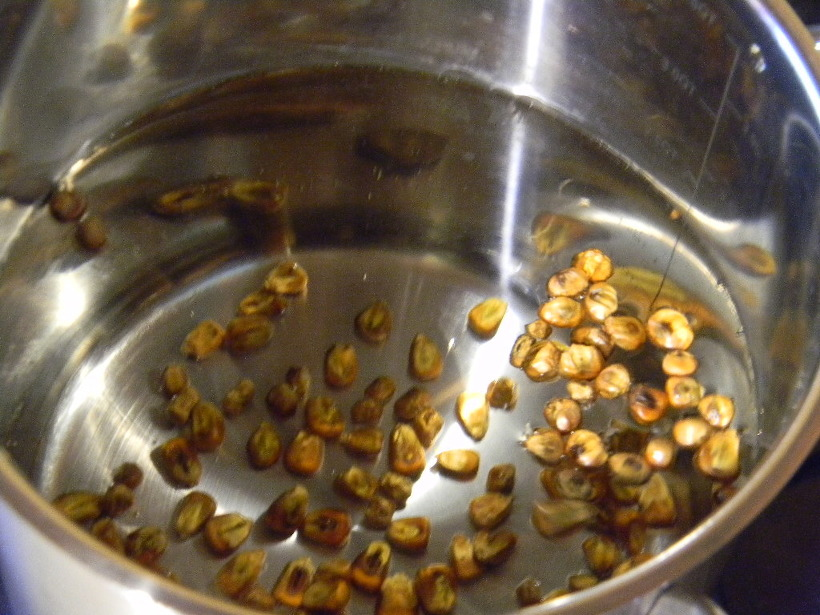
Boiling roasted corn kernels

== See also ==
- Bori-cha – barley tea
- Hyeonmi-cha – brown rice tea
- Memil-cha – buckwheat tea
- Roasted grain beverage
