= Scorched rice =

Crunchy, slightly browned cooked rice

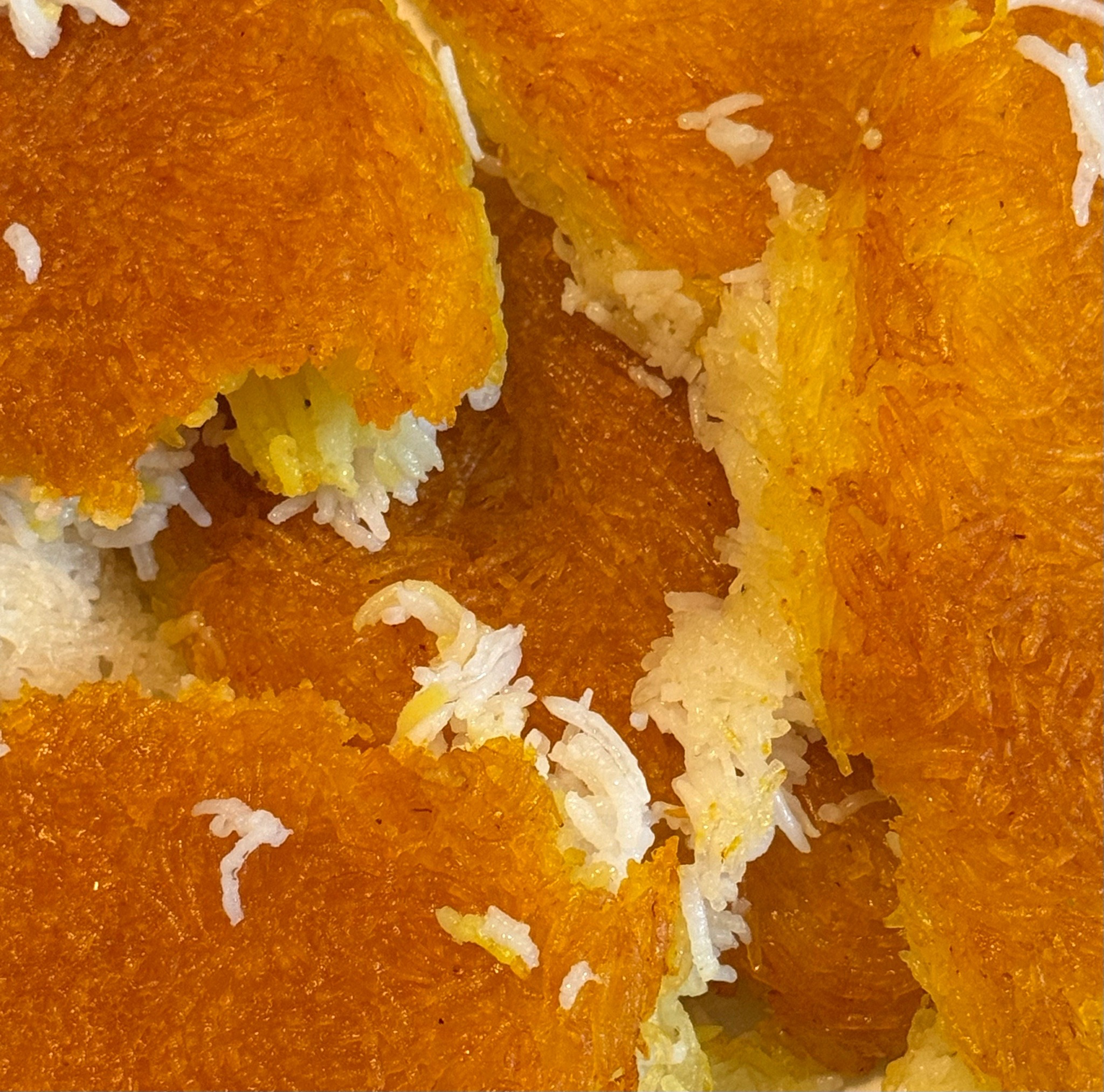
- Scorched rice in Iran
- Alternative names: List: pegao - Puerto Rico; concón - Dominican Republic; concolón - Peru, Panama; cocolón - Colombia, Ecuador, Venezuela; graten - Haitian Creole; cucayo – Quechua; htamin gyo (ထမင်းချိုး) - Burmese; kerak nasi – Malay (including Indonesian and Malaysian Standard Malay); kaning tutóng – Filipino; cơm cháy – Vietnamese; apango – Malagasy; guōbā (锅巴^{(s)}; 鍋巴^{(t)}) – Mandarin Chinese; faan6 ziu1 (饭焦^{(s)}; 飯焦^{(t)}) – Cantonese Chinese; nurungji (누룽지) – Korean; okoge (お焦げ) – Japanese; qazmagh (qazmağ) or qazandibi (qazandibi)– Azerbaijani; tahdig (تهدیگ) – Persian; bınkıř (بنکڕ) – Kurdish; hakakeh (حكاكه) - Iraqi Arabic; kodada (كداده) - Hejazi Arabic; arae el halla (قرع الحلّة) - Egyptian Arabic; socarrat - Valencian and Catalan; kanzo or ɛmo ase - Twi; mawowó - Makhuwa; kokorota - Cape Verdean Creole
- Type: Cooked rice
- Main ingredients: Rice
- Variations: Cucayo, guōbā, nurungji, okoge, tah dig, rengginang

Scorched rice, also known as crunchy rice or tahdig, is a thin crust of slightly browned rice that forms at the bottom of a pot while the rice is cooking.

== Varieties ==
=== Cape Verde ===
In Cape Verdean cuisine, the burned, scorched, or otherwise crunchy rice at the bottom of the pot is referred to as kokorota. It is traditionally cooked outside, or in a semi-enclosed cooking space in a three-legged metal pot over burning firewood. In modern times, butane-powered stoves and store-bought pots are more commonly used in Cape Verde; however, the three-legged pots are still frequently used in the rural areas and when making food for parties, festivals or any occasion where large quantities of food are required.

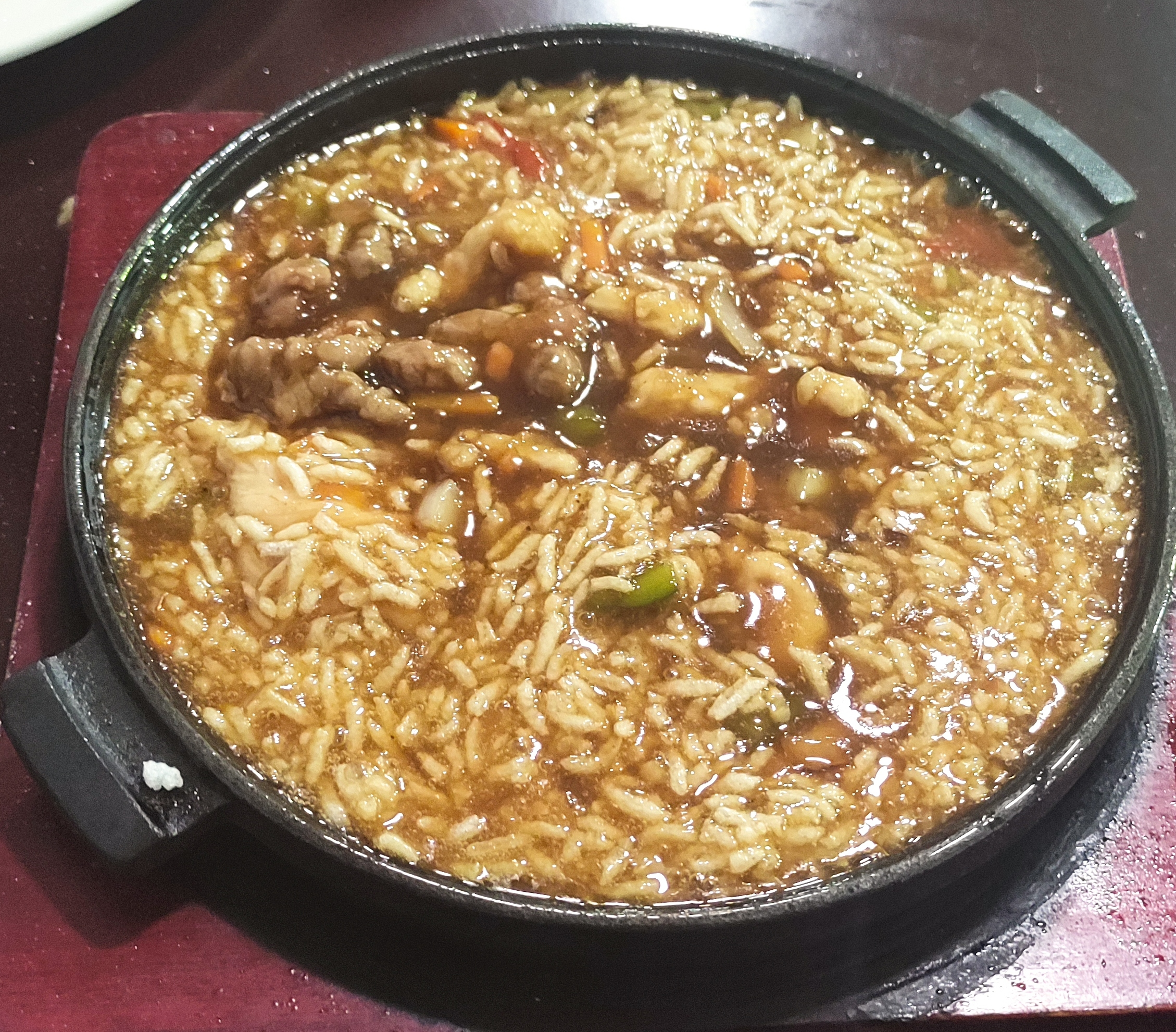
A dish of mi guoba in a Chinese restaurant in Valencia.

=== China ===
Guōbā (simplified Chinese: 锅巴; traditional Chinese: 鍋巴; pinyin: guō bā; lit. 'pan adherents'), sometimes known as mi guoba (米鍋巴, lit. 'rice guoba') is a Chinese food ingredient consisting of scorched rice. Traditionally guōbā forms on the bottom of the wok or cooking vessel during the boiling of rice. This scorched rice has a firm and crunchy texture with a slight toasted flavour, and is sometimes eaten as a snack: many commercial snack food varieties exist, often made of millet instead of white rice.

Guōbā is also used as an ingredient in many Chinese dishes with thick sauces, since the bland taste of the scorched rice takes on the flavour of the sauces. Guōbā is also served in soups and stews and prominently featured in Sichuan cuisine. Since demand for guōbā is so high, and most rice cooking methods produce only a small amount of scorched rice, guōbā has been commercially manufactured since the 1980s.

In Cantonese-speaking areas of China, scorched rice is known as faan6 ziu1 (飯焦, lit. 'rice scorch') and is a prominent feature of claypot rice.

=== Ghana ===
Scorched rice is referred to as kanzo or ɛmo ase (bottom of rice) in Twi. It is made by mistake or by chance since it happens when the rice burns while cooking. Some people choose to discard it. However, kanzo has been rebranded as a staple and is now being either sold or made.

=== Madagascar ===
Scorched rice is called apango in Madagascar. It is boiled with water and the obtained drink, is called "ranon'apango" ["apango" water] or "ranovola", ([golden water], in reference to the golden-black color). It serves as the national drink, accompanying every traditional food. The scorched rice, once softened, can also be eaten on its own, in place of traditional rice and is even favored in some regions.

=== Indonesia ===
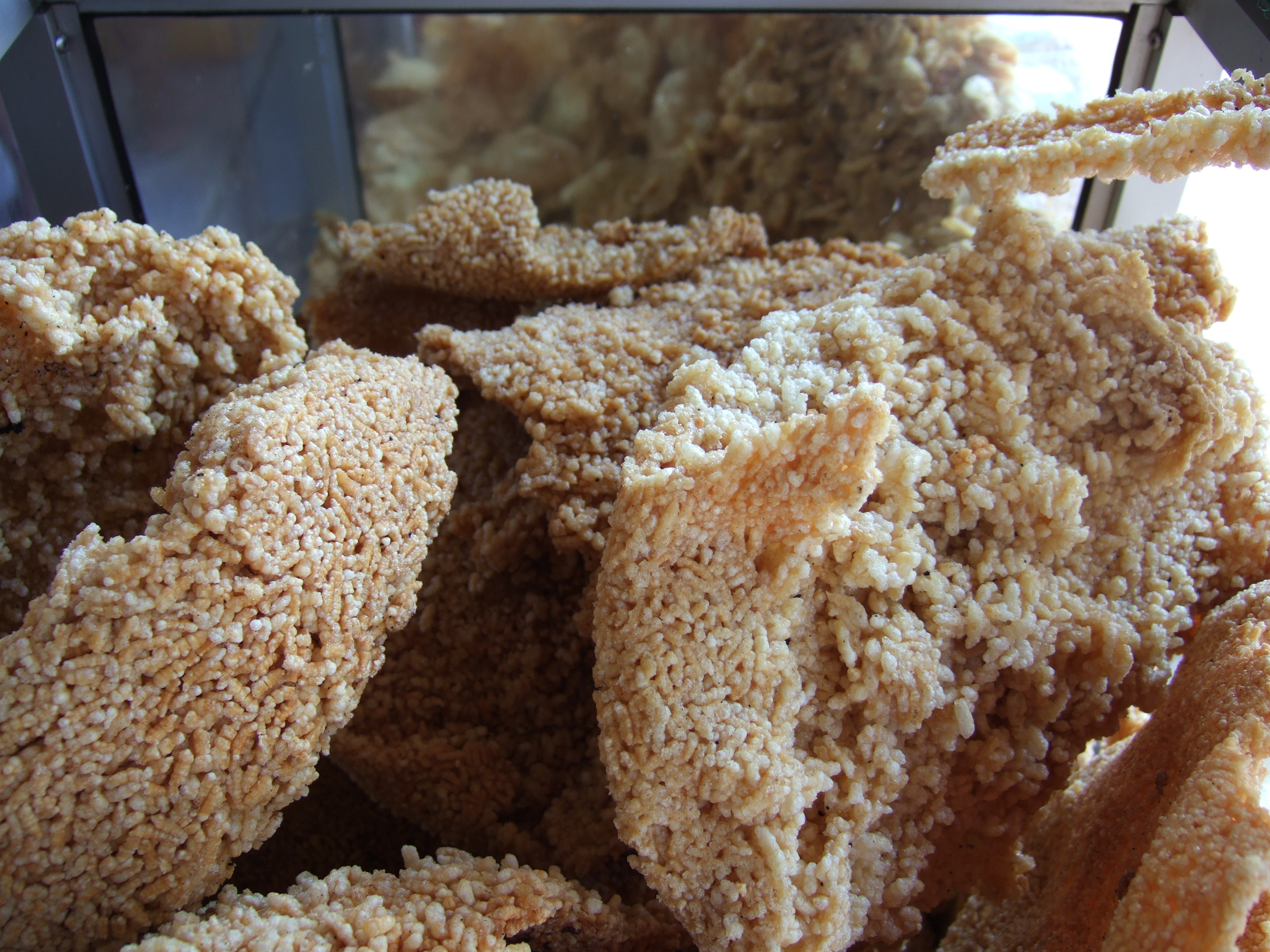
Large intip sold in Cirebon

In Indonesia, especially Central Java, scorched rice is called intip. It is a specialty of the Wonogiri Regency area and served as a cracker. The rice cracker is made from the hardened semi-burnt rice that sticks to the inner bottom of rice-cooking vessels. These cooking vessels are filled with water to loosen up the stuck rice. After it is separated from the cooking vessel, the stuck rice is sun-dried until it loses all of its liquid contents. The dried sticky rice is later deep-fried to create a crispy rice cracker.

In Indonesia there is a similar rice cracker called rengginang. Unlike intip, however, it is not made from scorched rice salvaged from the bottom of a rice cooking vessel, but created separately from steamed sticky rice, boiled, seasoned, made into a flat and rounded shape, and sun-dried prior to deep-frying.

=== Iran ===
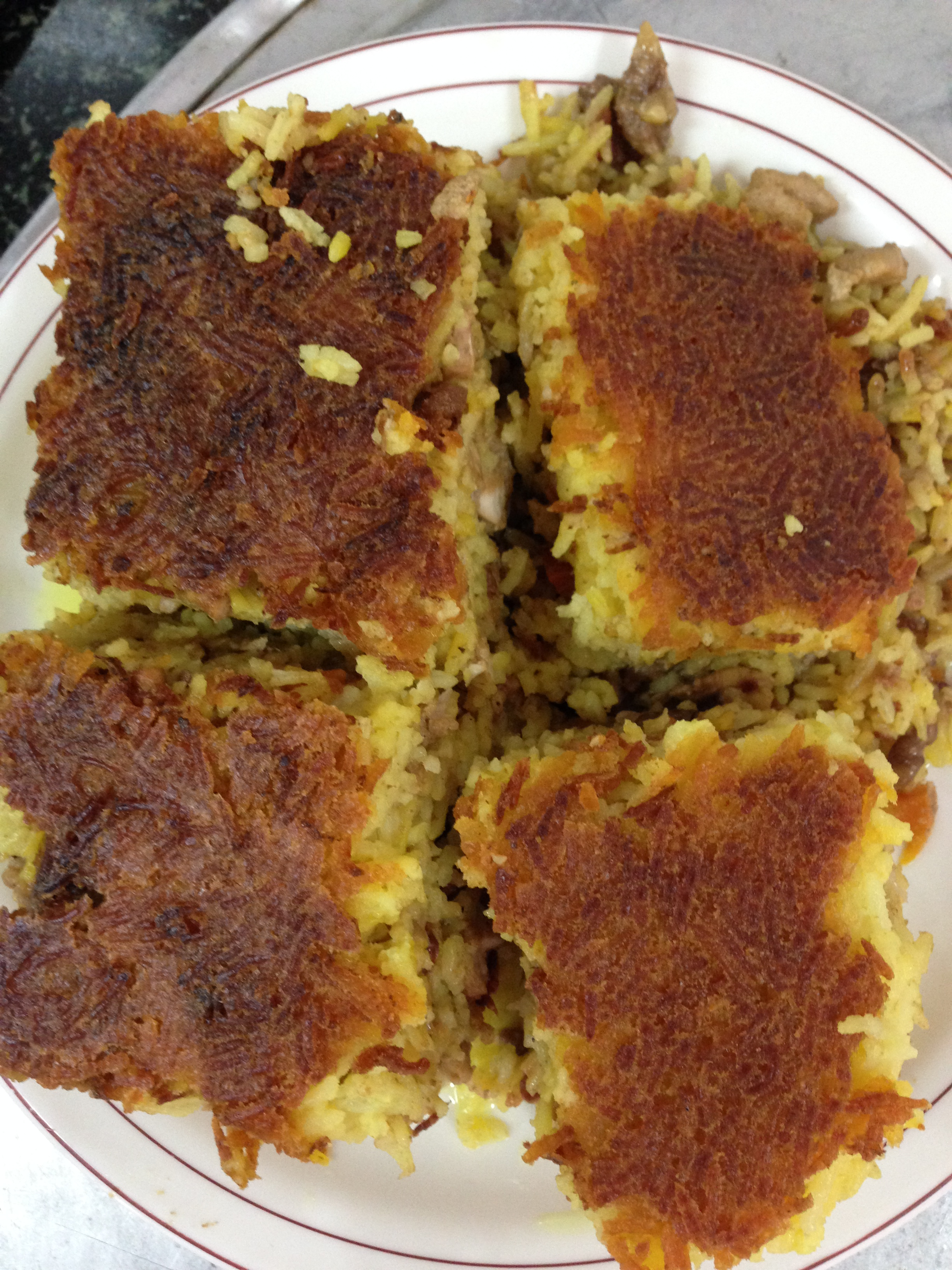
Tahdig (Tahchin), Iran

In Iran, Tahdig or Tahdīg (Persian: ته‌دیگ, tah "bottom" + dīg "pot") is a specialty of Iranian cuisine consisting of crisp, caramelized rice taken from the bottom of the pot in which the rice (chelow) is cooked. It is a necessary part of every kind of rice cooking and traditionally served to guests at a meal.

Often, instead of a pot of rice the bottom layer of which is crisped, a small amount of oil or lamb fat is first poured in the pot, then various items are placed at the bottom of the pot and then topped with rice, so the bottom ingredients crisp up instead of the rice. Variations of tahdig include yogurt mixed with saffron, thin bread, toast, potato, pumpkin, tomato, carrots, spinach, lettuce, beetroot, eggplant, and fruits such as sour cherry.

=== Iraq ===
Iraqi rice cooking is a multi-step process intended to produce tender, fluffy grains of rice. A prominent aspect of Iraqi rice cooking is the hikakeh, a crisp bottom crust. The hikakeh contains some loose rice as well. Before serving, the hikakeh is broken into pieces so that everyone is provided with some along with the fluffy rice.

=== Japan ===
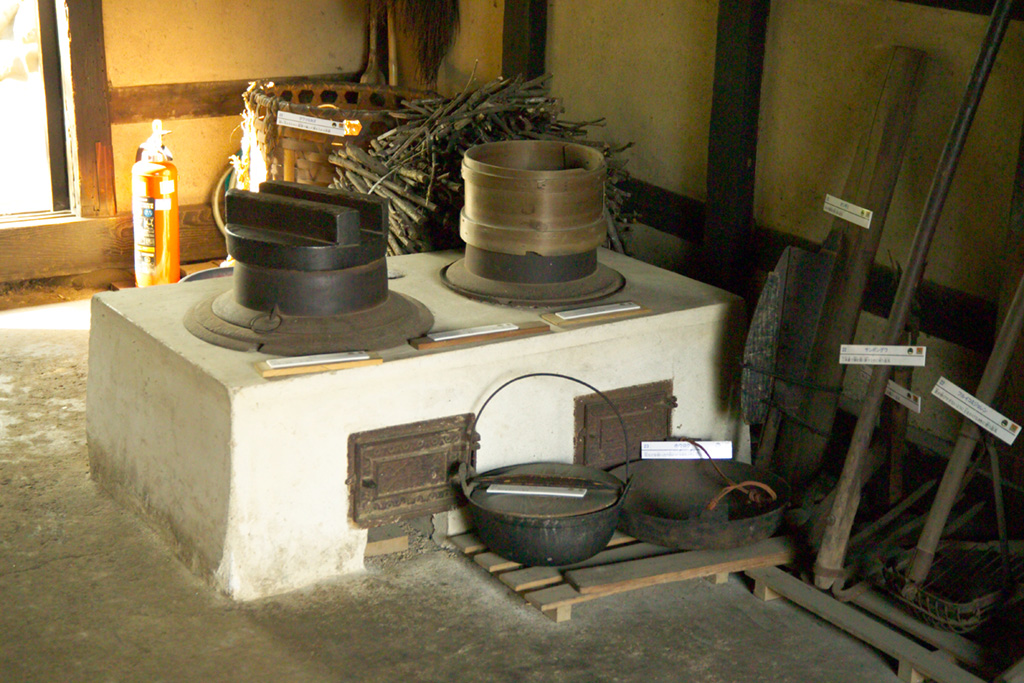
A traditional kamado in a Japanese museum

Okoge (お焦げ, おこげ) is Japanese food, usually rice, that has been scorched or blackened.

Until electric rice cookers came into common use in the 20th century, rice in Japan was cooked in a kamado, a traditional stove heated by wood or charcoal. Because regulating the heat of a wood or charcoal fire is more difficult, a layer of rice at the bottom of the pot would often be slightly burned during cooking; this layer, called okoge, was not discarded, but was eaten with vegetables or moistened with water, soup, or tea.

Okoge is still eaten in Japanese cuisine, and is an important part of the kaiseki meal served at tea ceremonies, where it is typically served with hot water and pickles as the final course. It has a crispy texture and a nutty flavour.

Because the cooking temperature of modern electric rice cookers is precisely controlled, okoge does not usually form naturally during the cooking process. However, there are rice cookers on the market in Japan that have an okoge setting. Okoge can also be made by scorching cooked rice in a frying pan.

Okoge is Japanese slang for a woman who has gay friends, roughly equivalent to fag hag, as portrayed in the film, Okoge (film).

=== Korea ===
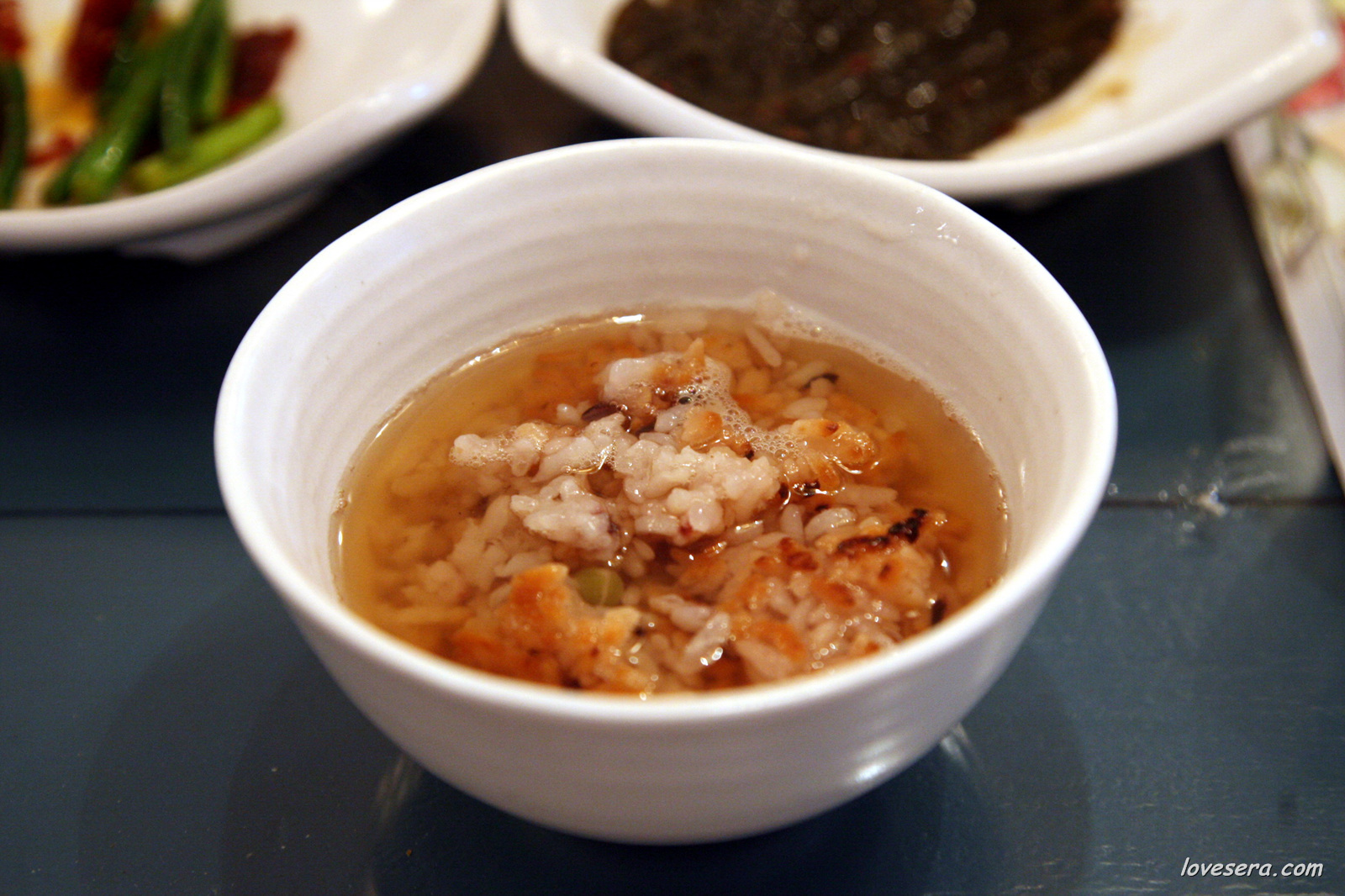
nurungji

Nurungji (Korean: 누룽지) or scorched rice is a traditional Korean food made of scorched rice. After boiling and serving rice, a thin crust of scorched rice will usually be left in the bottom of the cooking pot. This yellowed scorched state is described as nureun (눌은) in Korean; nurungji derives from this adjective.

Nurungji can be eaten in its crisp state as a snack or as an after meal rice tea by adding hot water, or reboiled with water to make nureun bap (눌은밥) or nurungji bap (누룽지밥). Nurungji in its broad sense also refers to the crisp crust that forms at the bottom of the pots and pans when cooking various rice dishes such as dolsot bibimbap (돌솥 비빔밥) and bokkeumbap.

Nurungji is traditionally known for its medicinal attributes. According to records in the 17th century medical book Dongui Bogam, nurungji was called chwigeonban (취건반; 炊乾飯) and considered as a remedy "when food does not swallow easily, upsets the stomach and induces vomiting". It is also lauded as a well-being food in South Korea.

South Korean companies made nurungji available in various pre-packaged forms around the mid-2000s. Besides sweet fried nurungji snacks and instant nurungji to make nureunbap, many nurungji-flavored products were also developed such as candies and tea. Nurungji is also used as an ingredient in a variety of new dishes like nurungji baeksuk and nurungji pizza.

Mentions of nurungji in folklore are common, the most famous being a folk song recognizing the difficulties of memorizing the Thousand Character Classic. The lines are changed from the original chant to a clever rhyme that loosely translates into "sky cheon (天), earth ji (地), nurungji in the gamasot (cauldron pot)". (Korean: "하늘 천, 따 지, 가마솥에 누룽지").

=== Latin America ===
Scorched rice is known as cucayo, pegao, cocolón (Ecuador), concolón, raspa, raspado, graten (Haiti), bunbun (Jamaica) and concón (Dominican Republic) in the Caribbean. In Colombian cuisine, scorched rice is called cucayo, pega or pego. It is often consumed with vegetable toppings as a cracker, or served in soups. It is also eaten alone or used to make leftovers. In Dominican cuisine, scorched rice is called concón, though this word can refer to the crunchy, toasted underside of other food types as well, while the same can be said of graten in Haitian cuisine. In Puerto Rican cuisine, scorched rice is called pegao (shortened "pegado", "stuck"). In Ecuador, kukayu (cucayo) is the name given to food items that are meant for travel, derived from kukayu (Quechua for a ration of coca). In Trinidad and Tobago cuisine and other English speaking Caribbean countries, scorched rice at the bottom of the pot is called bun bun.

=== Myanmar (Burma) ===
In the Burmese language, scorched rice is called htamin gyo (ထမင်းချိုး). It is commonly found in hsi htamin, glutinous rice cooked with turmeric and oil.

=== Philippines ===
Tutong (Tagalog) or dukót (Cebuano, "to stick") is used for a wide variety of dishes in Philippine cuisine, even as flavouring for ice cream. Some people may consider it a poverty food, but others eat it because they enjoy the taste.

=== Spain ===
Socarrat (in Catalan language) refers to the crust that forms on the bottom of the pan when cooking paella. Locally, it is regarded as a particularly tasty bit. It is also known as churruscado in Spanish.

=== Vietnam ===
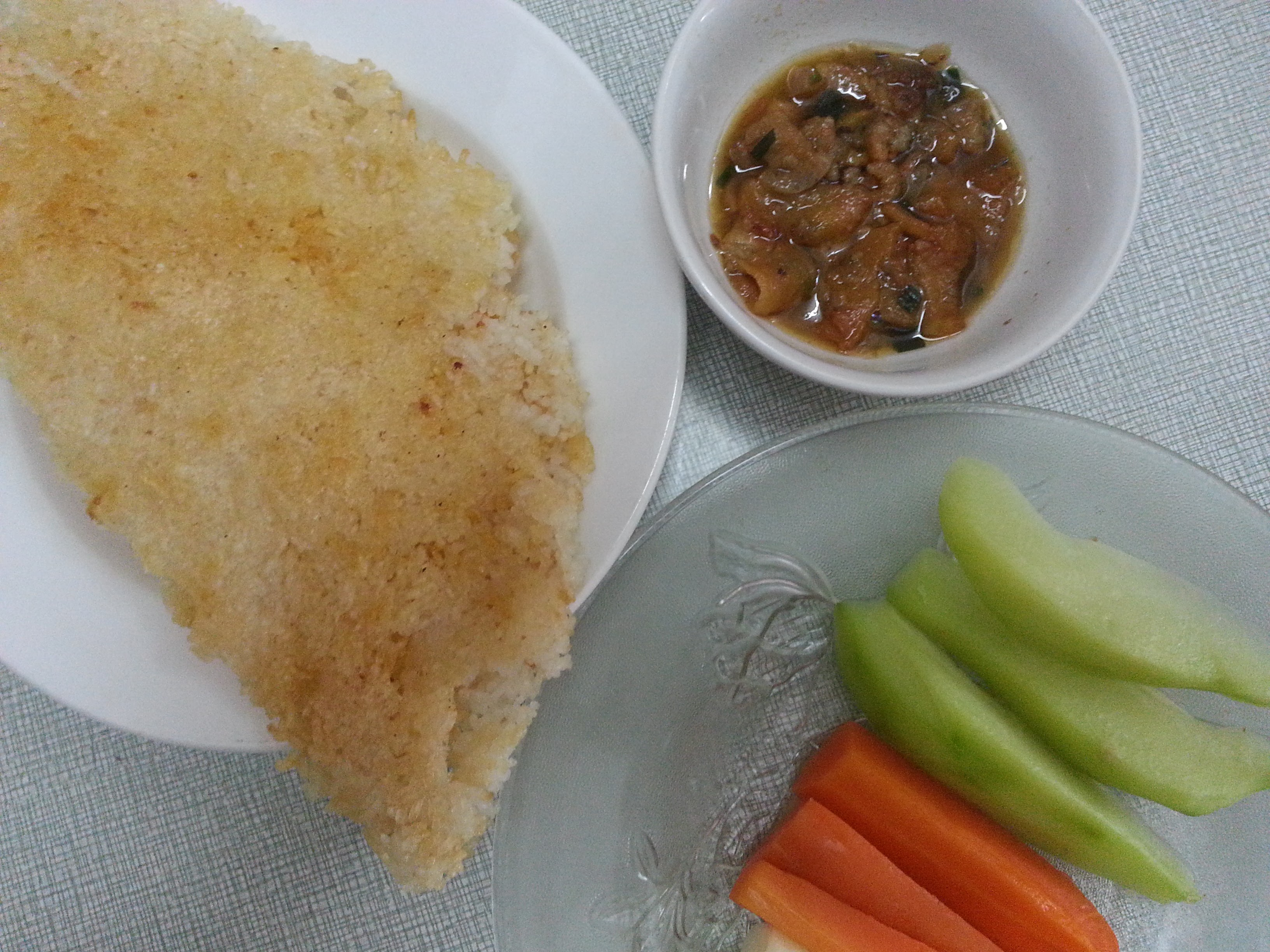
Cơm cháy kho quẹt

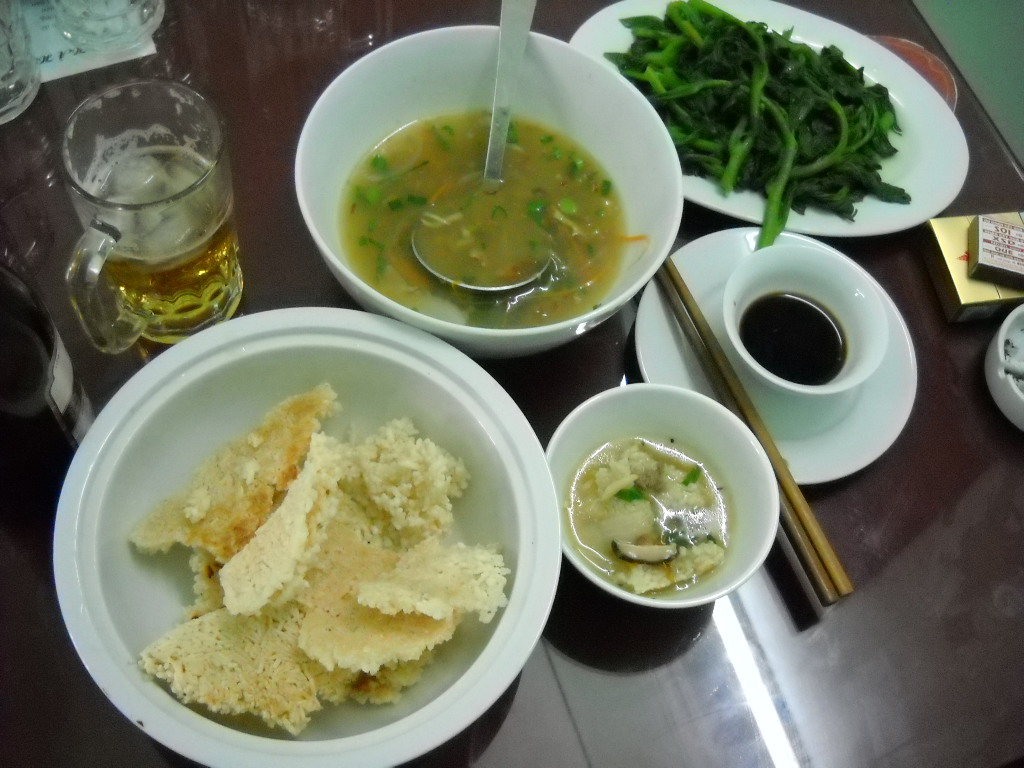
Cơm cháy with goat meat

In Vietnamese cuisine, it is called cơm cháy (literally "scorched rice") or "nếp chiên" (fried sticky rice) based on regions and cooking methods. It is typically fried in oil until golden brown, then topped with chà bông (pork floss) or tôm khô (dried shrimp), mỡ hành (chopped scallions cooked by pouring boiling oil over them to release their aroma), and chili paste to produce a popular dish called cơm cháy chà bông or cơm cháy tôm khô (although both the pork and shrimp may be used, in which case the dish is called cơm cháy chà bông tôm khô or cơm cháy tôm khô chà bông). Cơm cháy may be made from the crust of rice left over from cooking rice in an iron pot, or, more commonly since the advent of electric rice cookers in the late 20th century, from leftover rice that is fried in oil over high heat to acquire a crispy texture.

== See also ==
- Cooked rice
- Sungnyung
- Tahchin
