= Genmaicha =

Japanese brown rice green tea

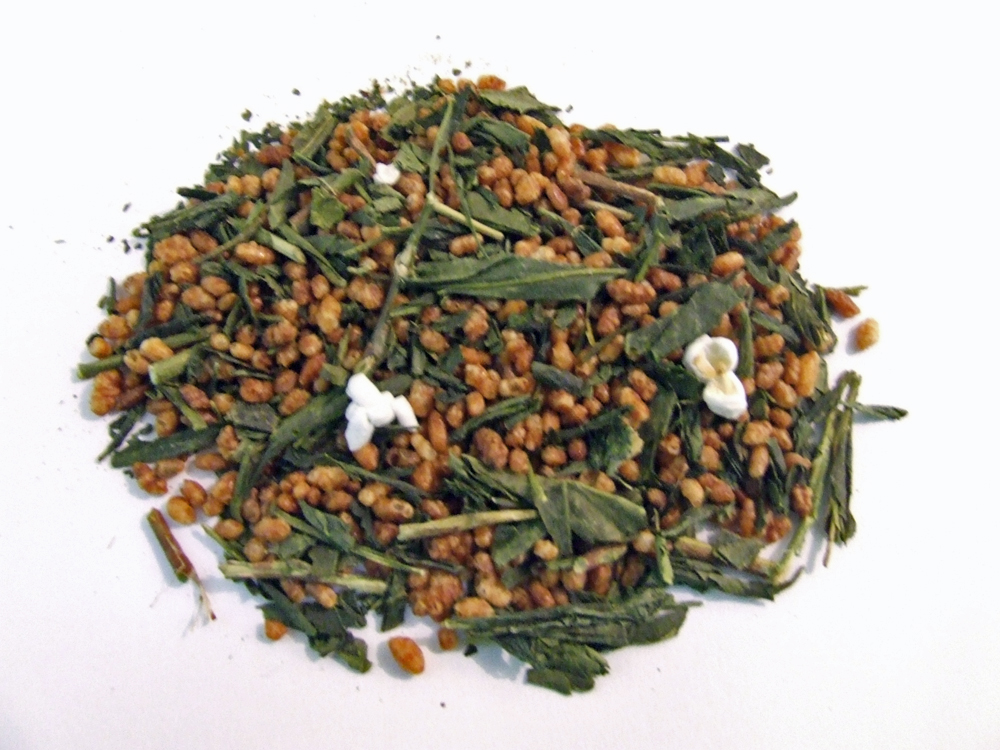
- Type: Green
- Other names: 玄米茶 (Kanji); Roasted rice tea "Popcorn tea"
- Origin: Japan

Genmaicha (玄米茶; 'brown rice tea') is a Japanese green tea combined with roasted popped brown rice. It is sometimes referred to colloquially as "popcorn tea" because a few grains of the rice pop during the roasting process and resemble popcorn, or as "people's tea", as the rice served as a filler and reduced the price of the tea, making it historically more available for poorer Japanese. Today all segments of society drink genmaicha. It was also used by people fasting for religious purposes or who found themselves to be between meals for long periods of time.

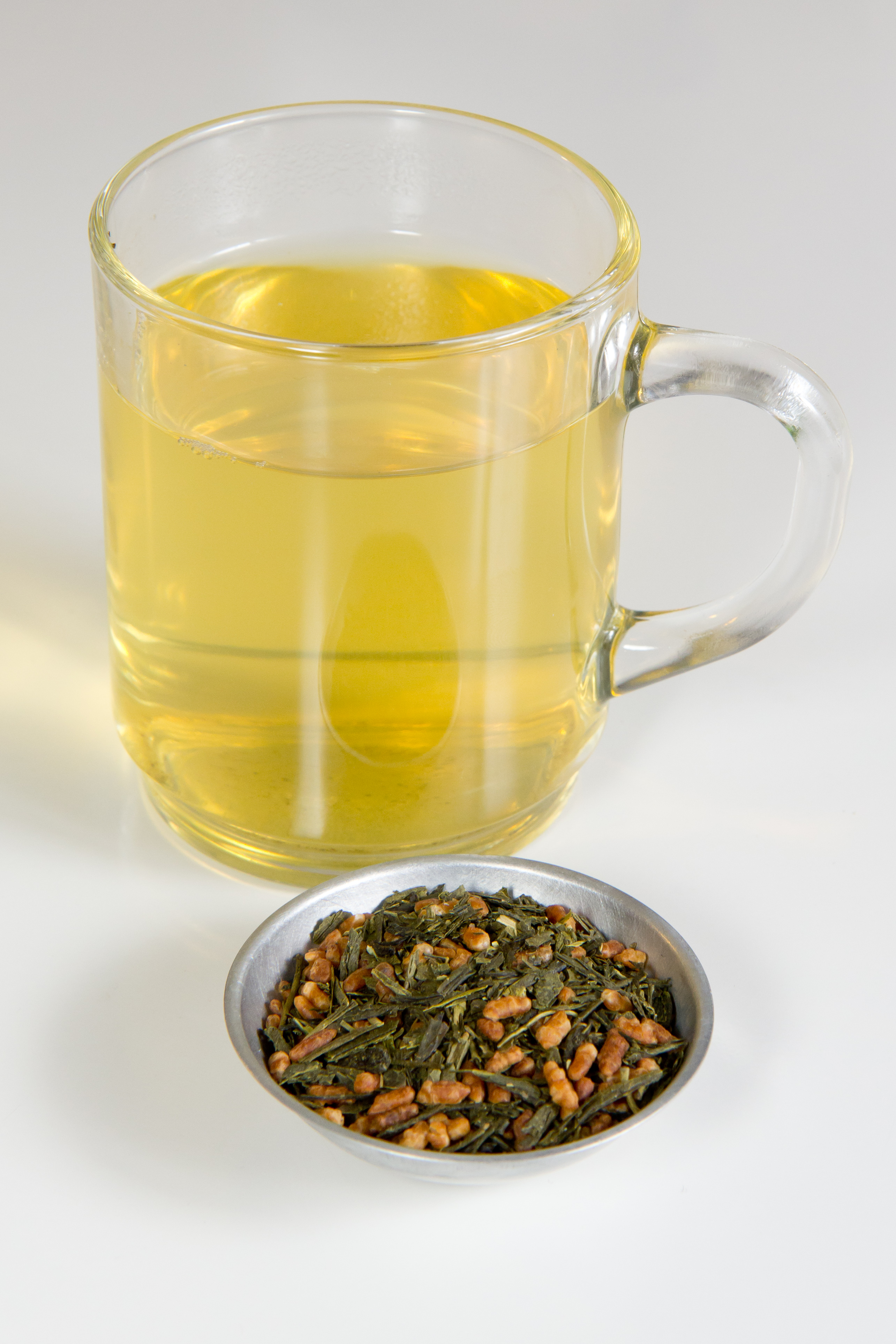
Brewed and unbrewed genmaicha

The sugar and starch from the rice cause the tea to have a warm, full, nutty flavor. It is considered easy to drink and to make the stomach feel better. Tea steeped from genmaicha has a light yellow hue. Its flavor is mild and combines the fresh grassy flavor of green tea with the aroma of the roasted rice.

Genmaicha is also sold with matcha (powdered green tea) added to it. This product is called matcha-iri genmaicha (抹茶入り玄米茶; lit. 'genmaicha with added powdered tea'). Matcha-iri genmaicha has a similar flavor to plain genmaicha, but the flavor is often stronger and the color more green than light yellow.

In South Korea, a very similar tea is called hyeonminokcha (현미녹차, 'brown rice green tea'), while the word hyeonmicha (현미차), which is a cognate of genmaicha, refers to an infusion of roasted brown rice in boiling water.

== See also ==
- List of Japanese green teas
- Mugicha, a tisane made from roasted barley
- Roasted grain drink
- Strobilanthes tonkinensis, an herb used to give teas a glutinous rice flavor without any rice
