= Brown rice =

Whole-grain rice, as opposed to white rice

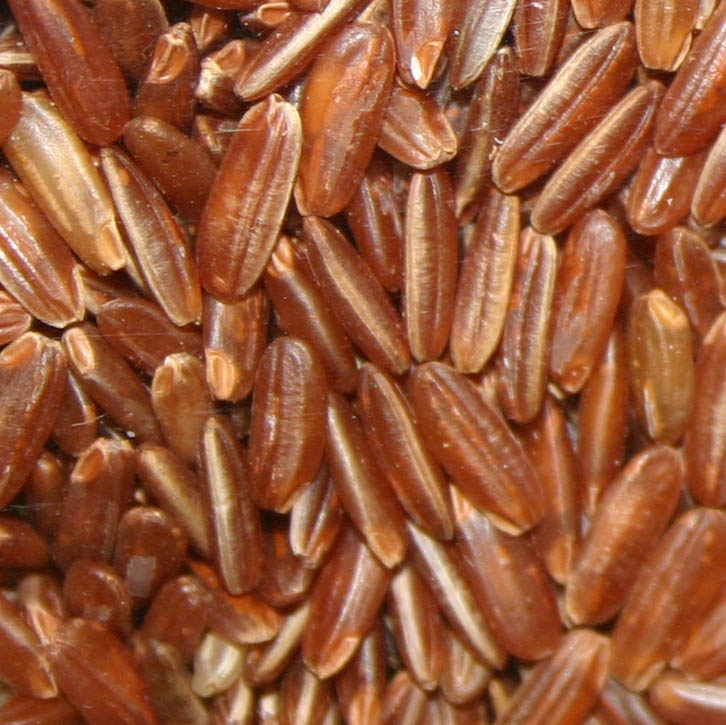

Chinese name
- Chinese: 糙米
- Literal meaning: rough rice
Transcriptions
Standard Mandarin
- Hanyu Pinyin: cāomǐ
- Wade–Giles: ts'ao^{1}-mi^{3}
- IPA: [tsʰáʊmì]
Yue: Cantonese
- Yale Romanization: chou3 mai5
- Jyutping: cou3 mai5

Thai name
- Thai: ข้าวกล้อง

Korean name
- Hangul: 현미
- Hanja: 玄米
Transcriptions
- Revised Romanization: hyeonmi

Japanese name
- Kanji: 玄米
- Hiragana: げんまい
Transcriptions
- Romanization: genmai

Filipino name
- Tagalog: pinawà

Nepali name
- Nepali: मार्सी चामल

Brown rice is a whole grain rice with only the inedible outer hull removed. This kind of rice sheds its outer hull or husk but the bran and germ layer remain on, constituting the brown or tan colour of rice. White rice is the same grain without the hull, the bran layer, and the cereal germ. Red rice, gold rice, and black rice (also called purple rice) are all whole rice with differently pigmented outer layers.

== Cooking time ==
Brown rice generally needs longer cooking times than white rice, unless it is broken or flour blasted (which perforates the bran without removing it). Studies in 2003 estimated a cooking time between 35 and 51 minutes. A shorter cooking time is necessary for "converted" or parboiled rice.

== Storage ==
Brown rice has a shelf life of approximately 6 months, but hermetic storage, refrigeration or freezing can significantly extend its lifetime. Freezing, even periodically, can also help control infestations of Indian meal moths.

== Nutrition ==
Cooked, long-grain brown rice is 70% water, 26% carbohydrates, 3% protein, and 1% fat. In a reference amount of 100 grams (3.5 oz), cooked brown rice supplies 123 calories of food energy, and is a rich source (20% or more of the Daily Value, DV) of manganese (36% DV) and moderate source (11–17% DV) of magnesium, phosphorus, niacin, and thiamine.

Rice, brown, long-grain, cooked
Nutritional value per 100 g (3.5 oz)
- Energy: 514 kJ (123 kcal)
- Carbohydrates: 25.6 g
- Sugars: 0.24 g
- Dietary fiber: 1.6 g
- Fat: 0.97 g
- Protein: 2.74 g
Vitamins and minerals
Vitamins	Quantity %DV^{†}
Thiamine (B1)	15% 0.18 mg
Riboflavin (B2)	5% 0.07 mg
Niacin (B3)	16% 2.56 mg
Pantothenic acid (B5)	8% 0.38 mg
Vitamin B6	7% 0.123 mg
Folate (B9)	2% 9 μg
Minerals	Quantity %DV^{†}
Calcium	0% 3 mg
Copper	12% 0.106 mg
Iron	3% 0.56 mg
Magnesium	9% 39 mg
Manganese	42% 0.974 mg
Phosphorus	8% 103 mg
Potassium	3% 86 mg
Selenium	11% 5.8 μg
Sodium	0% 4 mg
Zinc	6% 0.71 mg
- Other constituents: Quantity
- Water: 70.3 g
- Link to USDA FoodData Central entry
- ^{†}Percentages estimated using US recommendations for adults, except for potassium, which is estimated based on expert recommendation from the National Academies.

== Arsenic ==
Arsenic is in the natural environment and may be present in common grains, such as brown rice. Although rice may absorb arsenic more readily than other crops, rice remains a staple of a well-balanced diet, particularly when fortified with micronutrients in infant rice cereal.

Cooking brown rice in hot water can reduce the content of inorganic arsenic by 40–60%, although this cooking method also diminishes the content of micronutrients.

== In Vietnam ==
Brown rice is widely cultivated in Vietnam, mainly in the northern and central provinces. According to statistics from the Ministry of Agriculture and Rural Development, the area of brown rice cultivation in Vietnam in 2023 reached 150,000 hectares, with a production of 1.2 million tons. Brown rice has high economic value and is popular in the market. The price of brown rice is usually higher than white rice by 10–20%. Brown rice has great potential for development in Vietnam, and could become a major export product.

== Gallery ==
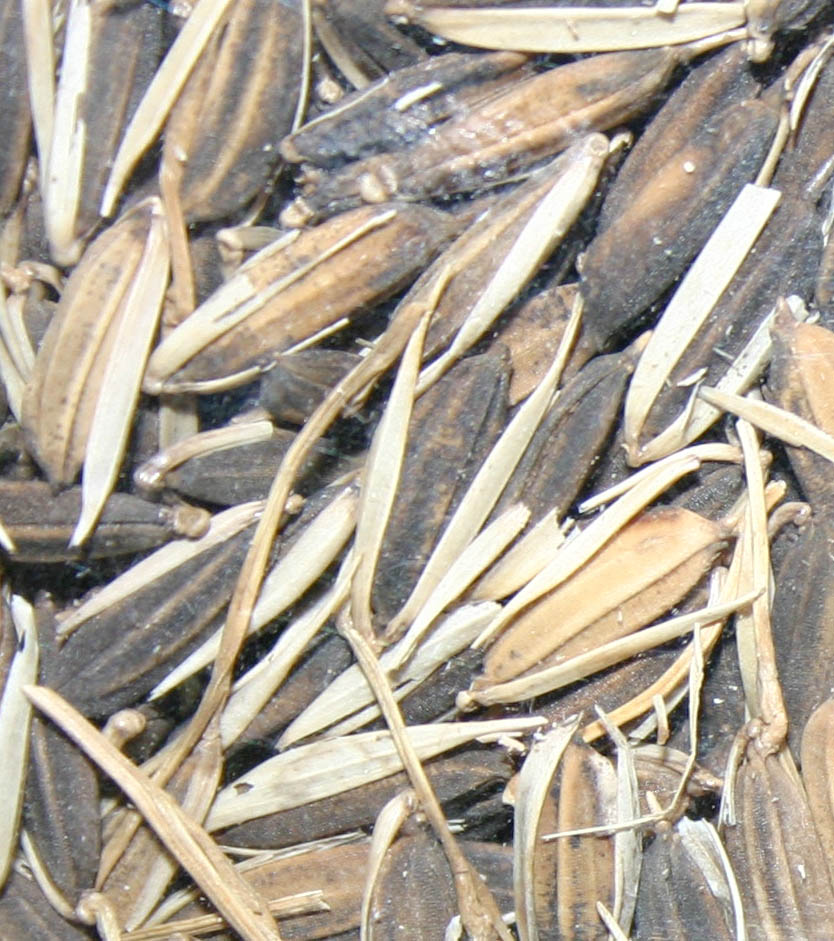
African rice in its inedible husk (seed rice, will sprout)

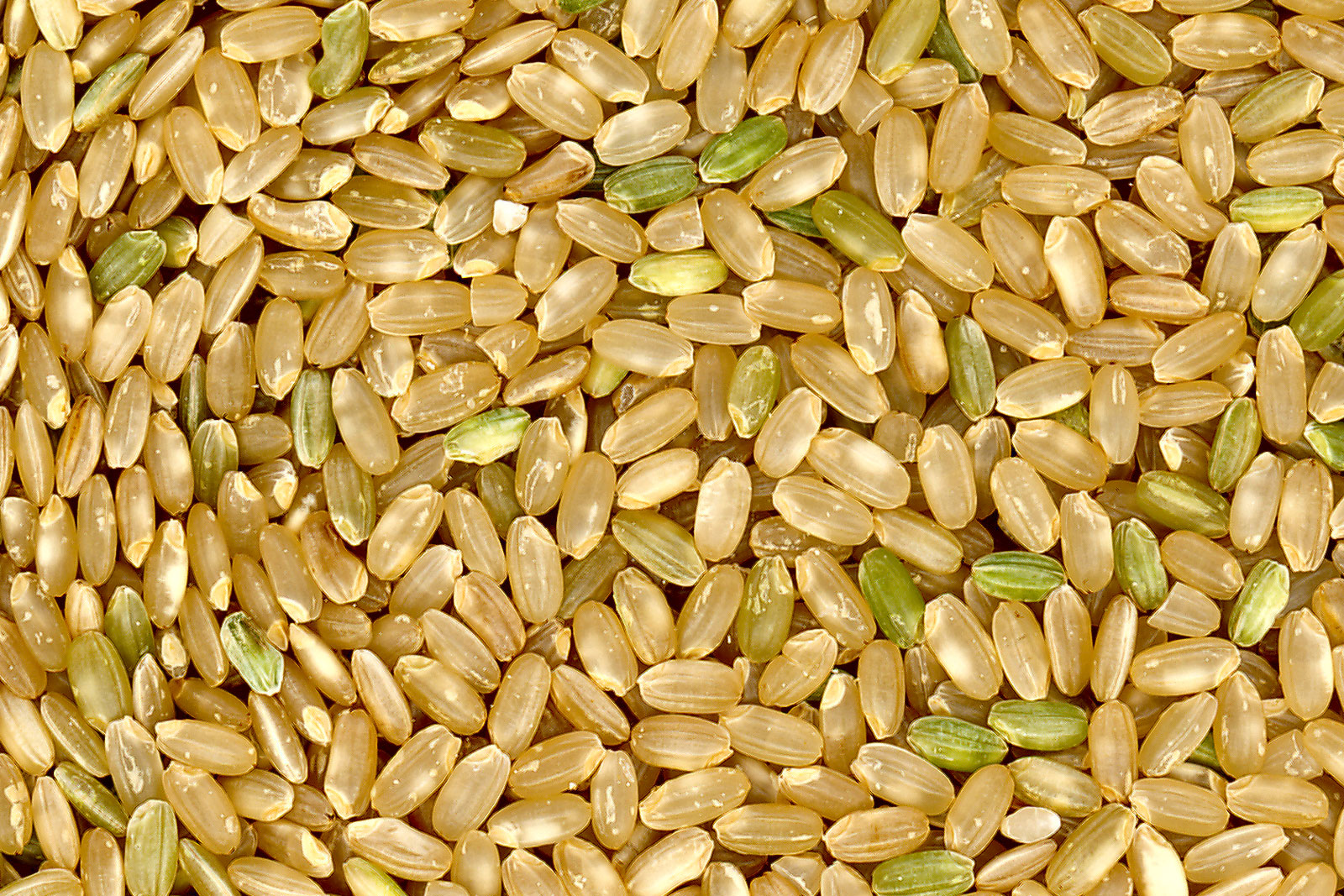
Rice, husked (whole brown rice; colour varies by variety)

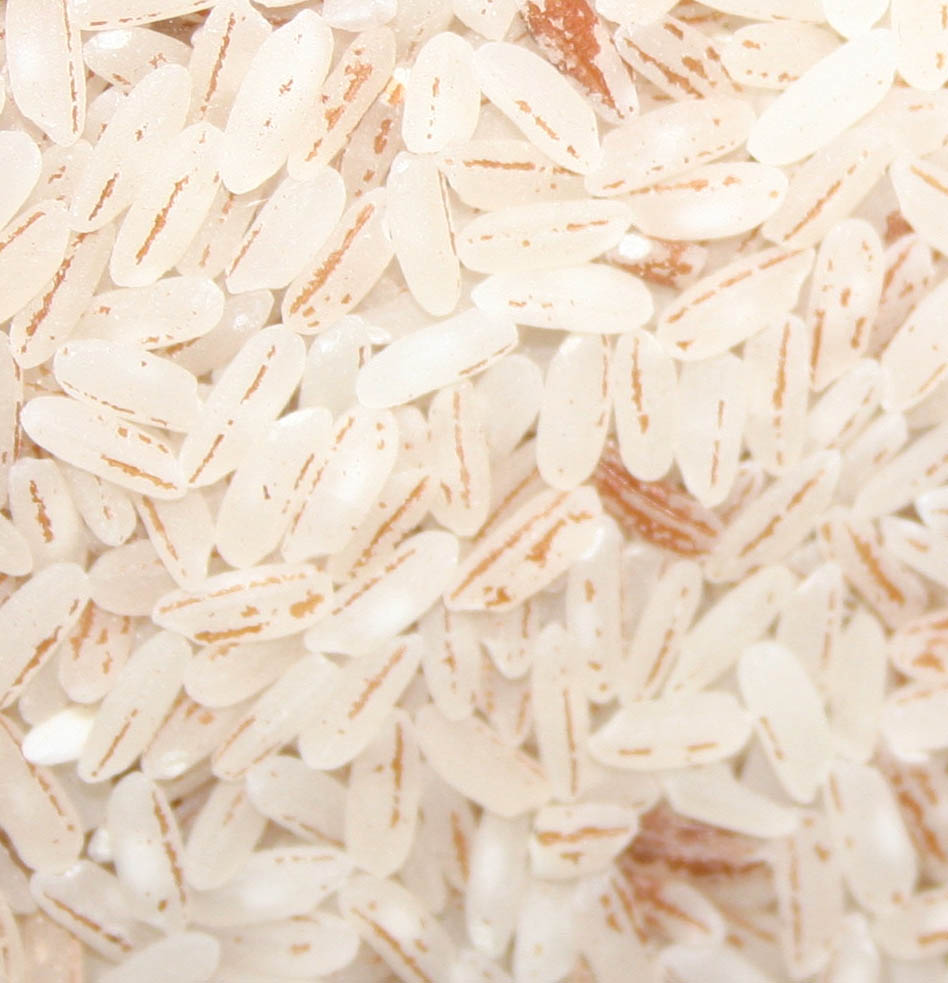
Rice, with almost all bran and germ removed to make white rice

A bowl of cooked brown rice

Brown rice as part of economy rice

== See also ==
- Brown rice tea
- Matta rice
